= Marquette =

Marquette may refer to:

== Locations ==
=== France ===
- Marquette-en-Ostrevant, Nord
- Marquette-lez-Lille, Nord

=== United States ===
- Marquette, Illinois
- Marquette, Iowa
- Marquette, Kansas
- Marquette, Nebraska
- Marquette (town), Wisconsin
  - Marquette, Wisconsin, village within the town
- Marquette County, Michigan
  - Marquette, Michigan, a city within the county
    - Roman Catholic Diocese of Marquette
  - Marquette Township, Marquette County, Michigan, a township within the country
- Marquette County, Wisconsin
- Marquette Heights, Illinois
- Marquette Interchange, in downtown Milwaukee, Wisconsin
- Marquette Island, in Lake Huron
- Marquette Mountain, a winter sports area in Marquette, Michigan
- Marquette Park, Chicago, Illinois
- Marquette Park (Gary), Indiana
- Marquette Park (Mackinac Island), Michigan
- Marquette Township, Mackinac County, Michigan
- Lake Marquette, a lake in Minnesota

=== Canada ===
- Marquette, Manitoba
- Marquette (provincial electoral district), a current provincial electoral district, or riding, in Quebec
- Marquette (federal electoral district), a Canadian electoral district in Manitoba from 1871 to 1976
- Marquette Lake, head water body of the Marquette River in Quebec
- Marquette River, a tributary of Ashuapmushuan Lake in Quebec
- Marquette River West, a tributary of the Marquette River in Quebec

== Education ==
- Marquette University, a Jesuit University in Milwaukee, Wisconsin
  - Marquette Golden Eagles, this school's athletic program
- Marquette High School (disambiguation), several

== People ==
- Chris Marquette, an American actor
- Jacques Marquette, a French explorer
- Ron Marquette, an American actor
- Sean Marquette, an American actor
- Turner M. Marquette, an American politician

== Transportation ==
- Marquette (automobile)
- Buick Marquette
- Marquette, a former train which operated on the current route of the Hiawatha (Amtrak train), which operates between Chicago and Milwaukee
- Marquette Transportation Company

== Ships ==
- USS Marquette (AKA-95), a World War II US ship launched in 1945
- USS Neshanic (AO-71), a World War II US ship built as the SS Marquette, launched in 1942
- SS Marquette (1881), a Lake Superior shipwreck off the coast of Wisconsin, United States
- SS Marquette (1897), a British World War I transport ship torpedoed in the Aegean in 1915
- Marquette (HBC vessel), operated by the Hudson's Bay Company from 1879 to 1883; see Hudson's Bay Company vessels

== Other uses ==
- Marquette (grape), a hybrid grape variety

== See also ==
- Pere Marquette (disambiguation)
- Marquette Building (disambiguation)
- Marquette Nat. Bank of Minneapolis v. First of Omaha Service Corp.
- The Marketts
- Mar-Keys
