= Pere Marquette (disambiguation) =

Pere Marquette or Jacques Marquette (1637–1675) was a French Jesuit missionary and namesake of Marquette University.

Pere Marquette or Father Marquette may also refer to:

== Locations and landmarks ==
- Pere Marquette, the original name (before the village plat of 1867) of Ludington, Michigan
- Pere Marquette Charter Township, Michigan
- Pere Marquette River
- Pere Marquette Hotel, a registered national landmark in Peoria, Illinois

== Parks, monuments, and reserves ==
- Father Marquette National Memorial in Straits State Park
- Pere Marquette State Park in Grafton, Illinois
- Pere Marquette State Forest in Michigan
- Pere Marquette Park, a park in Milwaukee, Wisconsin
- Pere Marquette Beach, Muskegon, Michigan
- Jacques Marquette (Knepper)
- Jacques Marquette (Trentanove)
- Pere Jacques Marquette (Queoff)

== Transport ==
- Pere Marquette Railway, in the Great Lakes region of the United States and Canada
- Pere Marquette Rail-Trail in the central lower peninsula of Michigan
- Pere Marquette (C&O train), a passenger train formerly operated by the Pere Marquette Railway and the Chesapeake and Ohio Railway
- Pere Marquette (Amtrak train), a passenger train operated by Amtrak
- Pere Marquette State Trail in the western lower peninsula of Michigan
- SS Pere Marquette (disambiguation)

== Other uses ==
- Pere Marquette Lumber Company, 19th-century commercial holdings of Ludington, Michigan

== See also ==
- Marquette (disambiguation)
