= Jacques Marquette =

French Jesuit missionary and explorer (1637–1675)

The Reverend Jacques Marquette SJ
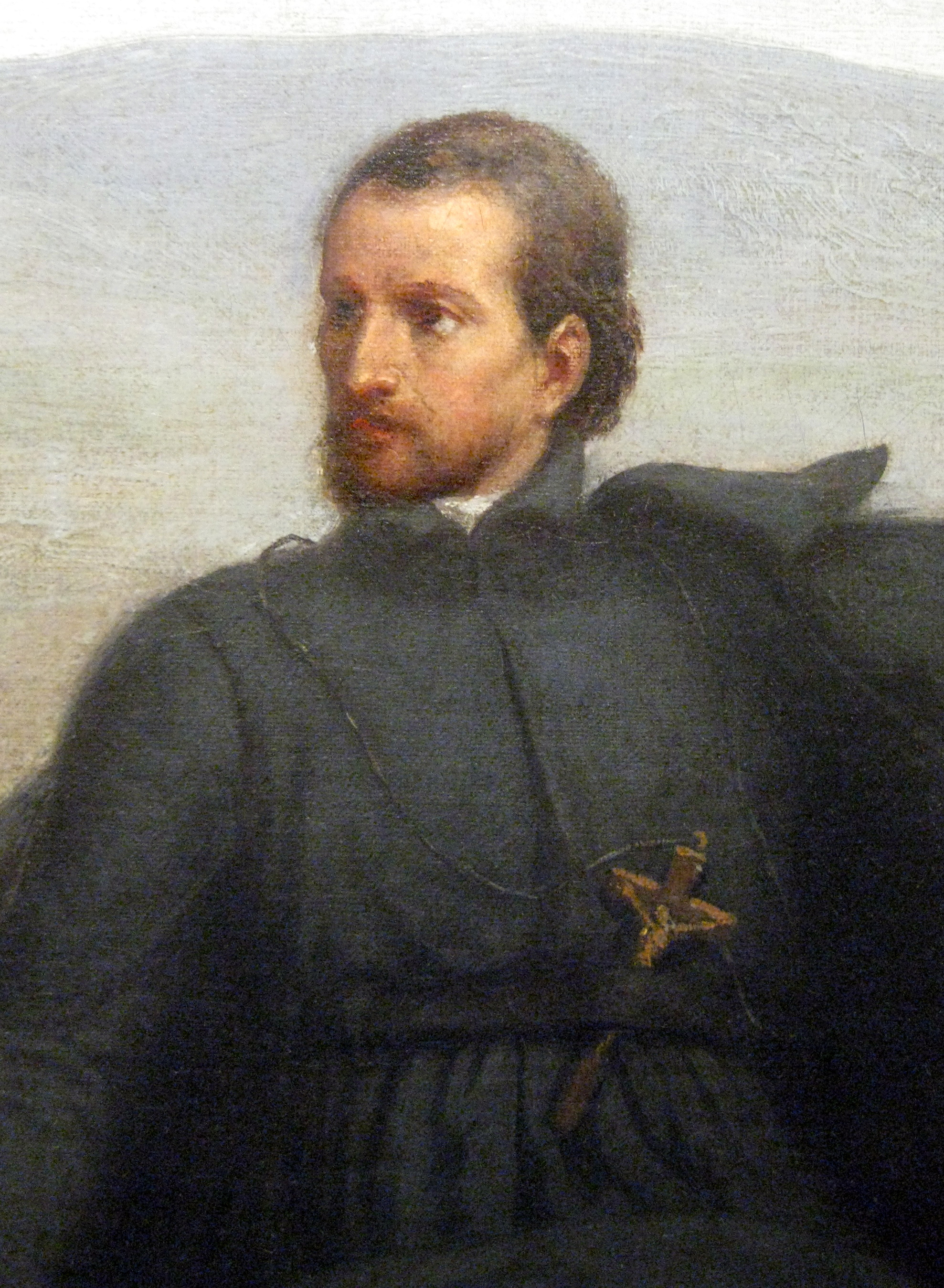
- 1869 portrait of Marquette
- Born: June 1, 1637; Laon, Kingdom of France
- Died: May 18, 1675 (aged 37) near Ludington, Michigan
- Other name: Pere Marquette

Jacques Marquette SJ (French: [ʒak maʁkɛt]; June 1, 1637 – May 18, 1675), sometimes known as Père Marquette or James Marquette, was a French Jesuit missionary who founded Michigan's first European settlement, Sault Sainte Marie, and later founded Saint Ignace. In 1673, Marquette, along with Louis Jolliet, an explorer born near Quebec City, explored and mapped the northern portion of the Mississippi River Valley.

== Early life ==
Jacques Marquette was born in Laon, Kingdom of France, on June 1, 1637. He was the third child of the Marquette family which was well-respected, as numerous members of the family had served in the military or taken civil posts.

Marquette was sent to study at the Jesuit College in Reims at the age of nine. He remained there until he joined the Society of Jesus at age 17. Marquette taught for a year at Auxerre, then studied philosophy at Pont-à-Mousson until 1659. He taught at Pont-à-Mousson, Reims, Charleville, and Langres until 1665.

Throughout this time, Marquette sent multiple requests to be sent on missionary work. The superior of the Jesuit mission in New France, Father Jérôme Lalemant, needed missionaries to work with the Five Nations. Marquette was ordained on the Feast of Saint Thomas Aquinas in Toul on March 7, 1666. Months later, on September 20, he arrived in Quebec.

== Missionary work ==
Marquette was first sent to the mission of Saint Michel at Sillery. Because this mission served peaceful and friendly indigenous people from different tribes, it was considered an ideal place for training new missionaries. Marquette studied the languages and customs of the Algonquin, Abenaki, and Iroquois people that he often tended to at Sillery.

From there, he was assigned to Trois-Rivières on the Saint Lawrence River, where he assisted Gabriel Druillettes. This mission was located in a river town that had permanent shops and taverns. A large number of French soldiers were stationed in the town, as there were frequent attacks from the Five Nations. During his two years at this mission, Marquette devoted himself to the study of the local languages and became fluent in six different dialects.

In 1668, Marquette was moved by his superiors to missions farther up the Saint Lawrence River, then into the western Great Lakes region. That year, he helped Druillettes, Brother Louis Broeme, and Father Claude-Jean Allouez found the mission at Sault Ste. Marie in present-day Michigan. The missionaries planted crops, then built a chapel and barns. They established friendly relationships with the Ottawa and Chippewa that were inhabiting that area, and were allowed to baptize most of the infants and people who were dying. Marquette noted that the Chippewa were great businessmen and exceptionally skilled at catching whitefish from the rapids in the St. Marys River. People from many tribes would travel to purchase the whitefish. Marquette and the other missionaries would explain their faith to the visiting Sioux, Cree, Miami, Potawatomi, Illinois, and Menominee. They hoped that these visitors would be interested in getting their own Jesuit missionary, or "Black Robe," as they were called by the indigenous people. In 1669, Marquette was assigned to replace Allouez at the La Pointe du Saint Esprit mission. Father Claude Dablon arrived to continue and expand the missionary work at Sault Ste. Marie.

Marquette began the 500-mile (800 km) journey to his new assignment in August, travelling by canoe along the south shore of Lake Superior. The party soon encountered wintry conditions on the lake and were often unable to light a fire when they went ashore at night. The party reached their destination on September 13, and were greeted by the Petun Huron. Excited to have a Black Robe again, they quickly assembled a banquet.

In addition to the Petun Huron, Marquette was tasked with missionary work for three bands of Ottawa: the Keinouche, Sinagaux, and Kiskakon. Marquette visited and attended to all four settlements. Since he felt the Kiskakon were the most ready to accept Christianity, he spent more time working with them and even lived with the families in their village.

During his time at La Pointe, Marquette encountered members of the Illinois tribes, who told him about the important trading route of the Mississippi River. They invited him to come to their village and teach their people, whose settlements were mostly farther south. Marquette was eager to explore this river and asked for permission to take a leave from missionary work, but he first had to attend to an urgent matter. The Hurons and Ottawa at La Pointe had begun fighting with the neighboring Lakota people. Because he feared an attack by the Lakota, Marquette felt it was necessary to find a new place for the mission. Dablon agreed that a new mission was necessary and offered to find a location. Some of the men wanted to stay and fight. Marquette attempted to discourage the imminent war, but most of the men maintained their position. He promised those who wanted to avoid the war that he would take them to a new mission and told them to prepare to move east.

In the spring of 1671, Marquette and his party began their journey to the new St. Ignace Mission. The canoes were loaded with men, women, children, animals, and personal belongings. They travelled through Lake Superior and down to the Straits of Mackinac The mission that Dablon had established for them was located on Mackinac Island. The group would be welcomed by a small group of Ottawa who already inhabited the island. Shortly after the new residents arrived on the island, they became worried about the possibility of winter starvation. They had noticed that game was scarce and no corn had grown. A group of elders approached Marquette with these concerns, and Marquette agreed. In the fall, the mission was moved to the mainland at St. Ignace, Michigan.

== Explorations ==
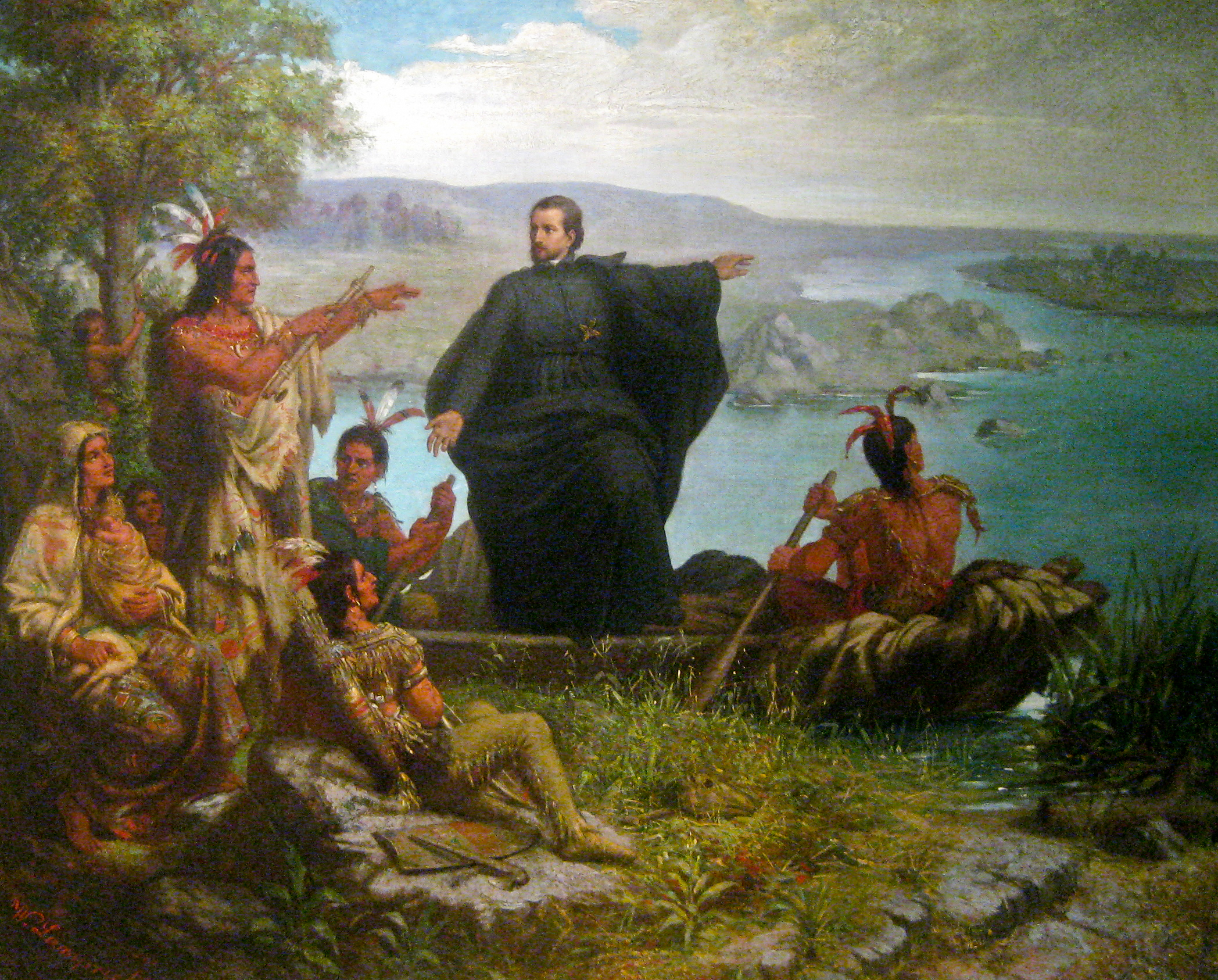
Pere Marquette and the Indians [at the Mississippi River], oil painting (1869) by Wilhelm Lamprecht (1838–1906), at Marquette University

Marquette's request to take a leave from missionary work to explore the great river was granted in 1673. Marquette joined the expedition of Louis Jolliet, a French-Canadian explorer. They departed from Saint Ignace on May 17 with two canoes and five voyageurs of French-Indian ancestry. Four of the five voyageurs are known: Jacques Largillier, Jean Plattier, Pierre Moreau, and Jean Tiberge. They travelled through Lake Huron and Lake Michigan and into Green Bay.

Green Bay is where the party made their first encounter with indigenous people. They met the Menominee, who were known as the "wild rice" people. Marquette told them of his mission to spread religion to the people along the river. The Menominee tried to discourage Marquette and the others, warning them about the perils of the river and the people inhabiting the land along it.The group of explorers next went up the Fox River, nearly to its headwaters. They came upon a village inhabited by Miami, Mascouten, and Kickapoo. They allowed Marquette to teach them about Christianity, and listened attentively. He was especially impressed by the Miami. Marquette noted that they were pleasant in appearance and temperament, despite their reputation as warriors. When Marquette's party left the village, they were accompanied by two Miami that would assist them in finding their way to the Wisconsin River. From the Fox River, the Miami directed, and likely assisted, the men in portaging their canoes for almost two miles through marsh and oak plains to the Wisconsin River, Many years later, the town of Portage, Wisconsin was built and named for the ancient path between the two rivers. They ventured forth from the portage and entered the Mississippi near present-day Prairie du Chien, Wisconsin on June 17.

Eight days later, the travelers found footprints near the Des Moines River and went to investigate. They were enthusiastically greeted by the Peoria people who lived nearby in three small villages. Marquette and the others were welcomed by the elders, who offered accommodations and had a banquet prepared. The men were offered many gifts by the Peoria. Since Marquette and the men were traveling, they had to decline the most of what was offered. Marquette did accept a calumet that was gifted to him by the chief. The chief explained that it was a symbol of peace and advised Marquette to display it as an indication of his amicable intentions. As the men left the village, the Peoria chief cautioned them against going too much farther south.

As the party continued south, Marquette hoped to find the Chanouananons. They were known to be friendly to French, and Marquette felt they may be interested in Christianity. They did not find the Chanouananons, but Marquette did notice iron in the Wabash area. Once the summer heat and mosquitoes began to cause great discomfort, the men stopped going ashore at night. They slept in the canoes, using the sails as protection from mosquitoes. This attracted the attention of some Native Americans, who pointed guns at the travelers. Marquette held the calumet over his head. He attempted to communicate by speaking Huron, but was unsuccessful. He correctly felt they may have misunderstood the intentions of the men with guns, and that they were inviting them to their village. He and the other men followed them to their village, where they were fed beef and white plums.

At the mouth of the Saint Francis River, the men spotted a village. They heard war cries and saw men jumping into the river, trying to get to them. Marquette held the calumet over his head. The elders standing on shore saw this, and called off the attack. The men were invited to the village of the Michigamea. One of the Michigamea was able to speak to Marquette in the Miami Illinois language, but most of the communication was done through gestures. The men were fed fish and corn stew, then given a place to sleep for the night.

In the morning, Michigamea warriors in dugout canoes escorted them to the Akansea. They were greeted by a group of men in canoes who held up their own calumet. Marquette and the others were invited to the village. Many residents came out to see the Frenchmen. A chief led them to a room where elders and other chiefs had gathered. Marquette used an interpreter to ask about what was south of them. He was told that it was extremely dangerous. The people were hostile, well-armed, and would attack anyone who could interfere with their trading arrangements.

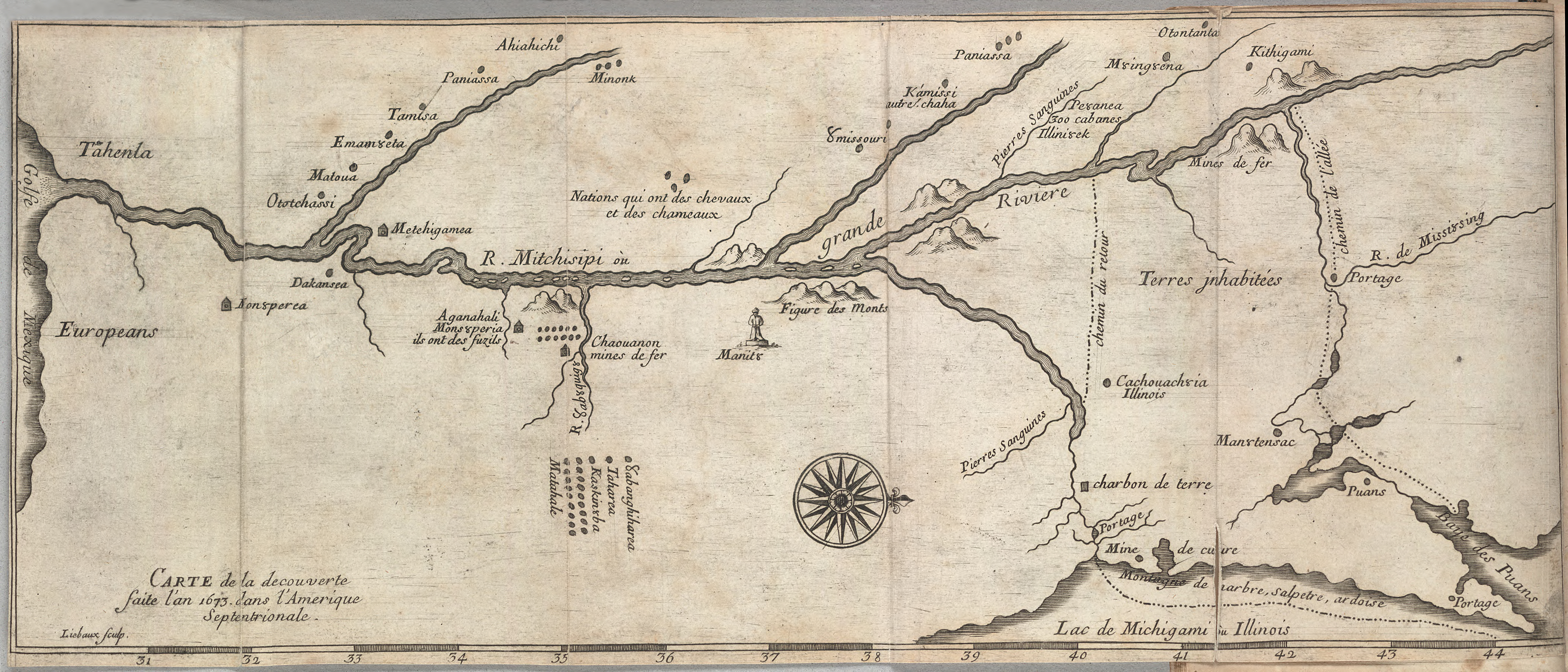
Map of the discovery made in the year 1673 in North America

The Jolliet-Marquette expedition had traveled to within 435 miles (700 km) of the Gulf of Mexico. Marquette and the other men began to consider whether the danger was worth the risk. By this point, they had encountered several natives carrying European trinkets, and they feared an encounter with explorers or colonists from Spain. The explorers had mapped the areas where they had been, including their flora, wildlife, and resources. After staying with the Akansea for two nights, the party decided to end the exploration.

On July 17, they turned back at the mouth of the Arkansas River. They followed the Mississippi back to the mouth of the Illinois River, which they had learned from local natives provided a shorter route back to the Great Lakes. They reached Lake Michigan near the site of modern-day Chicago, by way of the Chicago Portage. The party encountered a village of Kaskaskia, who invited Marquette to return and establish a mission. When the explorers left the village, some of the Kaskaskia got in their own canoes and traveled with them to Saint Francis Xavier mission in Green Bay, Wisconsin. Jolliet returned to Quebec to relate the news of their discoveries.

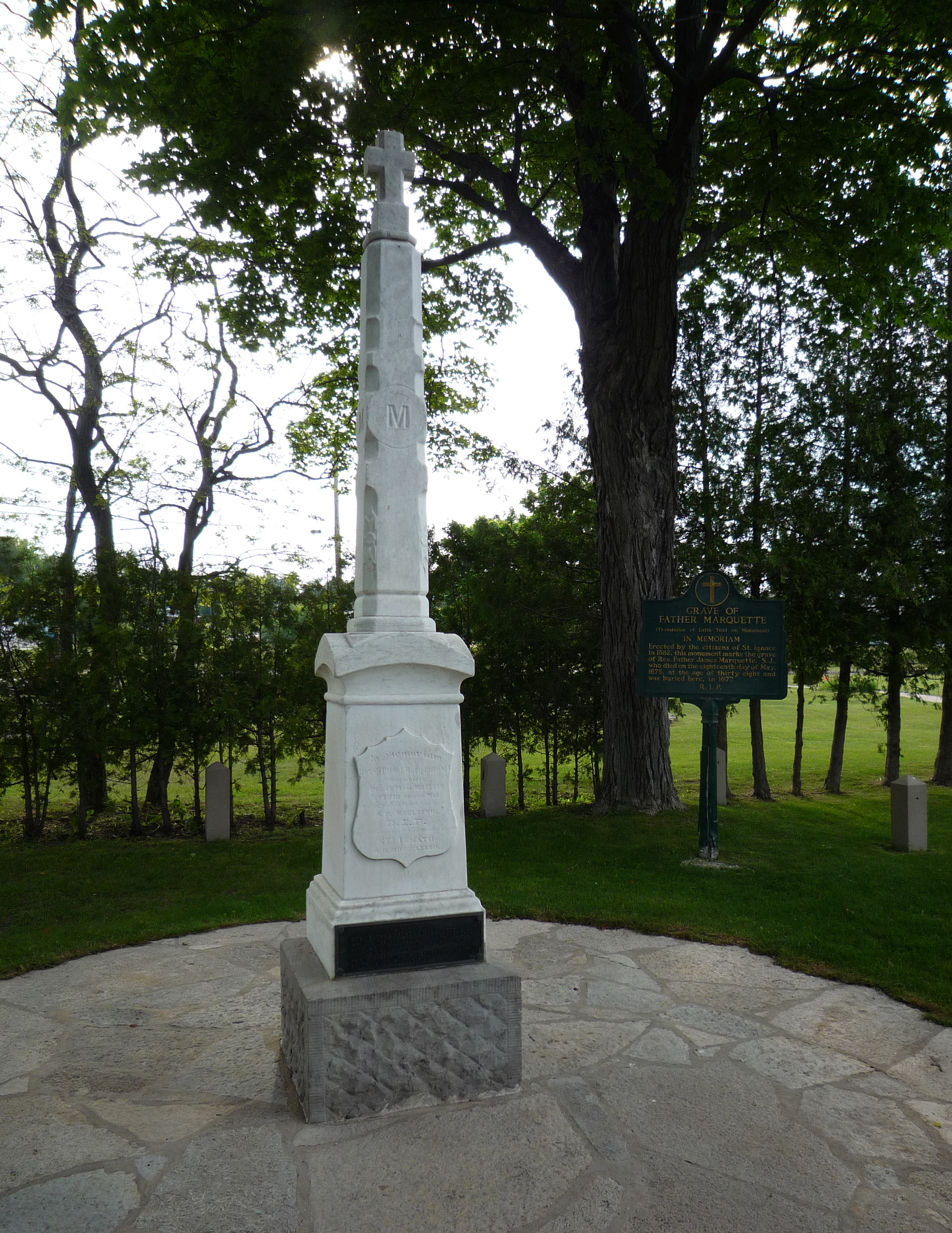
Grave of Jacques Marquette in Saint Ignace, Michigan

Marquette and his party returned to the Illinois territory in late 1674, becoming the first Europeans to winter in what would become the city of Chicago. As welcomed guests of the Illinois Confederation, the explorers were feasted en route and fed ceremonial foods such as sagamite. As Marquette had promised, he established The Immaculate Conception mission for the Kaskaskia.

== Death ==
In the spring of 1675, Marquette traveled westward and celebrated a public Mass at the Grand Village of the Illinois near Starved Rock. A bout of dysentery he had contracted during the Mississippi expedition sapped his health. On the return trip to Saint Ignace, he died at 37 years of age near the modern-day town of Ludington, Michigan, Frankfort, Michigan, or Manistee, Michigan. The exact location is disputed and not known. His companions, Pierre Porteret and Jacques Largillier, buried his body at a spot that Marquette had chosen. They marked his burial site with a large cross. Porteret and Lagrillier continued on to St. Ignace, so they could inform those at the mission.

Two years later, Kiskakon Ottawa from the Saint Ignace mission found Marquette's gravesite. They cleaned his bones in preparation for their journey. Ottawa and Huron, in about thirty canoes, accompanied them back to the mission. Marquette's remains were presented to Fathers Nouvel and Piercon. They led funeral services before burying his bones in the chapel at Mission Saint-Ignace on June 9, 1677.

In 2018, residents of St. Ignace, some of them descendants of those led by Marquette to the mission, became aware that an ounce of Marquette's bones was located at Marquette University. Talks between the residents and the university began. The Museum of Ojibwe Culture sent a formal request for the return of the bones. This request was accepted by Marquette University. Two Native American men, one an Anishinaabe elder, arrived at the university in March 2022. They were presented with Marquette's bones, which they placed in a birch box for the return to St. Ignace. Following a ceremony, the bones retrieved from the university were reburied with the rest of Marquette's bones on June 18, 2022.

A Michigan Historical Marker in Ludington, MI reads:

Father Jacques Marquette, the great Jesuit missionary and explorer, died and was buried by two French companions somewhere along the Lake Michigan shore on May 18, 1675. He had been returning to his mission at St. Ignace, which he had left in 1673, to go exploring in the Mississippi country. The exact location of his death has long been a subject of controversy. A spot close to the southeast slope of this hill, near the ancient outlet of the Pere Marquette River, corresponds with the death site as located by early French accounts and maps and a constant tradition of the past. Marquette's remains were reburied at St. Ignace in 1677.

Adjacent to gravesite of Marquette on State Street in downtown Saint Ignace, a building was constructed that now houses the Museum of Ojibwa Culture.

However, a Michigan Historical Marker in Frankfort, MI reads:

Marquette's Death: On May 18, 1675, Father Jacques Marquette, the great Jesuit missionary and explorer, died and was buried by two French companions somewhere along the Lake Michigan shore of the Lower Peninsula. Marquette had been returning to his mission at St. Ignace, which he had left in 1673 to go on an exploring trip to the Mississippi and the Illinois country. The exact location of Marquette's death has long been a subject of controversy. Evidence presented in the 1960s indicates that this site, near the natural outlet of the Betsie River, at the northeast corner of a hill which was here until 1900, is the Marquette death site and that the Betsie is the Rivière du Père Marquette of early French accounts and maps. Marquette's bones were reburied at St. Ignace in 1677.

== Legacy ==
In the early 20th century Marquette was widely celebrated as a Catholic founding father of the region.

=== Places ===
- Marquette County, Michigan; Marquette County, Wisconsin
- Several communities, including: Marquette, Michigan; Marquette, Wisconsin; Marquette, Iowa; Marquette, Illinois; Marquette Heights, Illinois; Pere Marquette Charter Township, Michigan; and Marquette, Manitoba
- Marquette University and Marquette University High School in Milwaukee, Wisconsin
- Marquette Island in Lake Huron
- Lake Marquette in Minnesota; Marquette Lake in Quebec
- Pere Marquette River and Pere Marquette Lake, which drain into Lake Michigan at Ludington, Michigan
- Marquette River in Quebec
- Marquette Elementary, Madison, WI
- Pere Marquette Park in Milwaukee, WI
- Pere Marquette State Park near Grafton, Illinois
- Marquette Catholic High School, Alton, IL
- Marquette Academy Catholic High School, Ottawa, IL
- École Père-Marquette, a high school in Montreal, Quebec
- Marquette Park, Chicago, Illinois
- Hotel Pere Marquette, Peoria, Illinois
- Marquette Park, Gary, Indiana
- Marquette Park, Mackinac Island, Michigan
- Marquette Park, St. Louis, Missouri
- Pere Marquette Beach, a public beach in Muskegon, Michigan
- Pere Marquette State Forest, in Michigan
- The Pere Marquette Railway
- Marquette Catholic Highschool, in Michigan City, Indiana
- "Cité Marquette," former US-City-Base (1956–1966) built by Americans based on the NATO Air Force Base in Couvron (38th Bombardment Wing), Laon, France (his birthplace).
- Marquette Transportation Company, a towboat company using a silhouette of the Pere in his canoe as their emblem.
- Marquette Building in Chicago; Marquette Building in Detroit; Marquette Building in Saint Louis, Missouri; Pere Marquette Hotel in Peoria, Illinois
- Marquette Avenue, a large street in Minneapolis, Minnesota
- Rue du Père Marquette and Rue Marquette, streets in Trois-Rivières, Québec.

=== Monuments ===
Marquette is memorialized by various statues, monuments, and historical markers:

- Father Marquette National Memorial near Saint Ignace, Michigan
- Chicago Portage National Historic Site, along with Louis Jolliet, near Lyons, Illinois
- Statues have been erected to Marquette various locations, including at Detroit, Michigan; Fort Mackinac, Michigan; Marquette, Michigan; Milwaukee, at Marquette University; Prairie du Chien, Wisconsin, Utica, Illinois; Laon, France; the National Statuary Hall of the United States Capitol; the Quebec Parliament Building
- The Legler Branch of the Chicago Public Library displays "Wilderness, Winter River Scene," a restored mural by Midwestern artist R. Fayerweather Babcock. The mural depicts Marquette and Native Americans trading by a river. Commissioned for Legler Branch in 1934, the mural was funded by the Works Projects Administration.

Marquette has been honored twice on postage stamps issued by the United States:

- A one-cent stamp in 1898, part of Trans-Mississippi Issue, which shows him on the Mississippi River; This is the first time a Catholic priest is honored by the U.S. Postal Department.
- A 6-cent stamp issued September 20, 1968, marking the 300th anniversary of his establishment of the Jesuit mission at Sault Ste. Marie.

== Bibliography ==
- Donnelly, Joseph P. (1985). Jacques Marquette, S.J. (1637–1675). Chicago: Loyola University Press.
- Repplier, Agnes (1929). Père Marquette: Priest, Pioneer, and Adventurer. New York: Doubleday, Doran and Company, Inc.

== Gallery ==
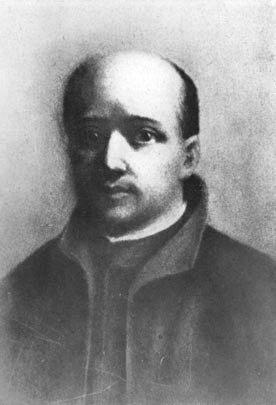
Sketch of Marquette

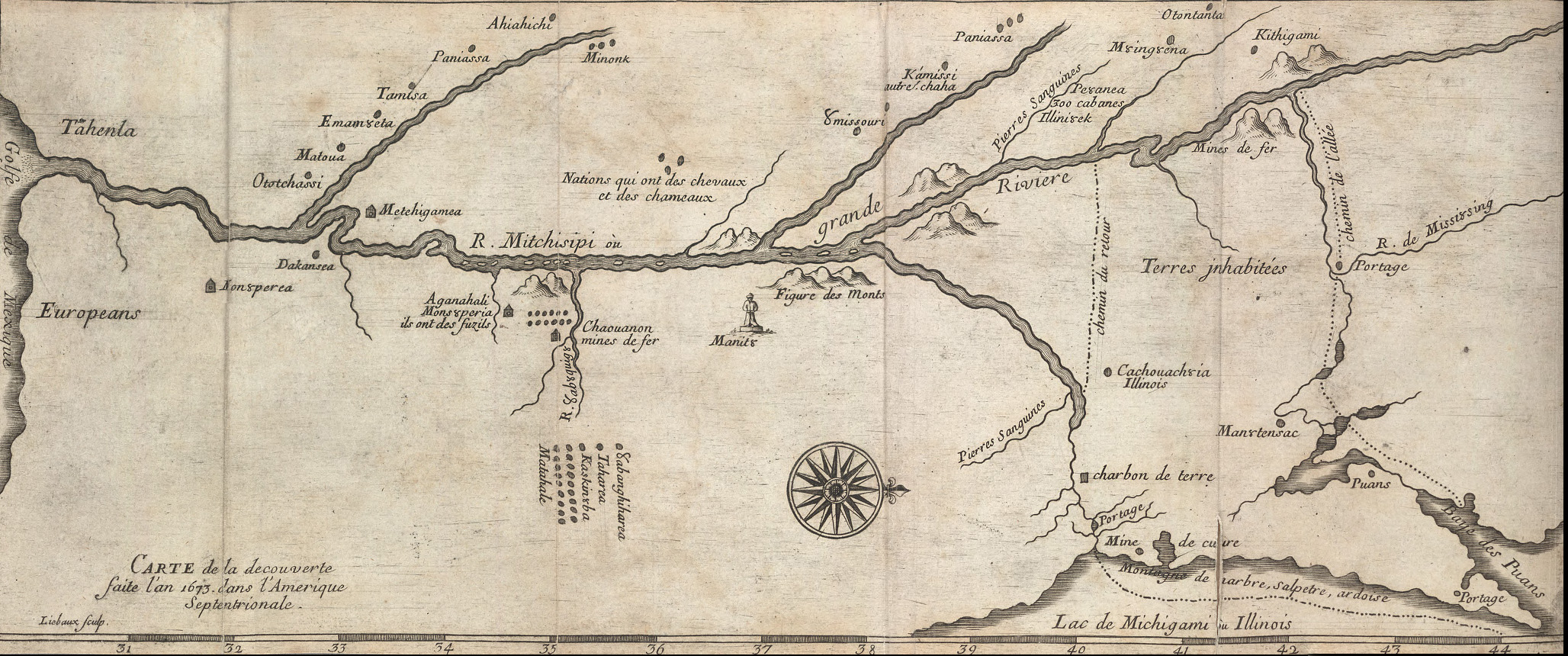
Ca. 1681 map of Marquette and Jolliet's 1673 expedition

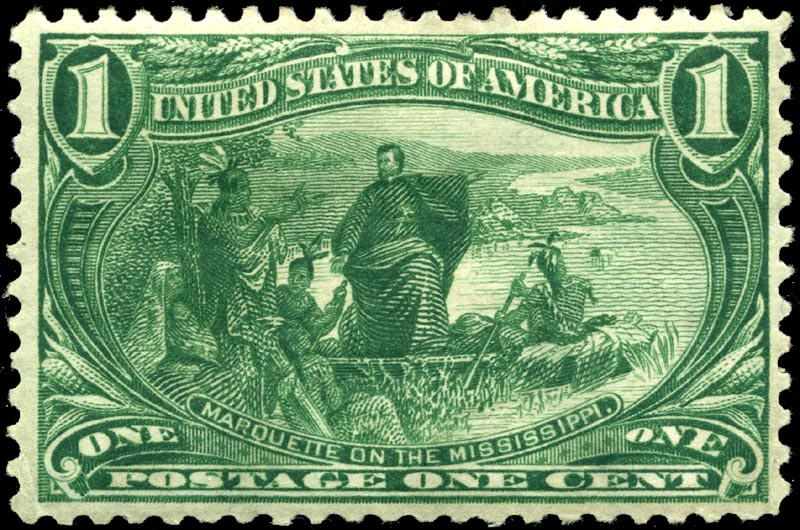
"Marquette on the Mississippi", 1898 issue

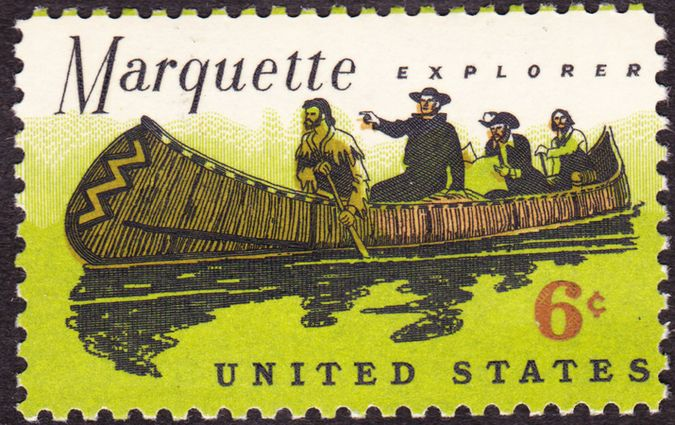
"Marquette explorer", 1968 issue

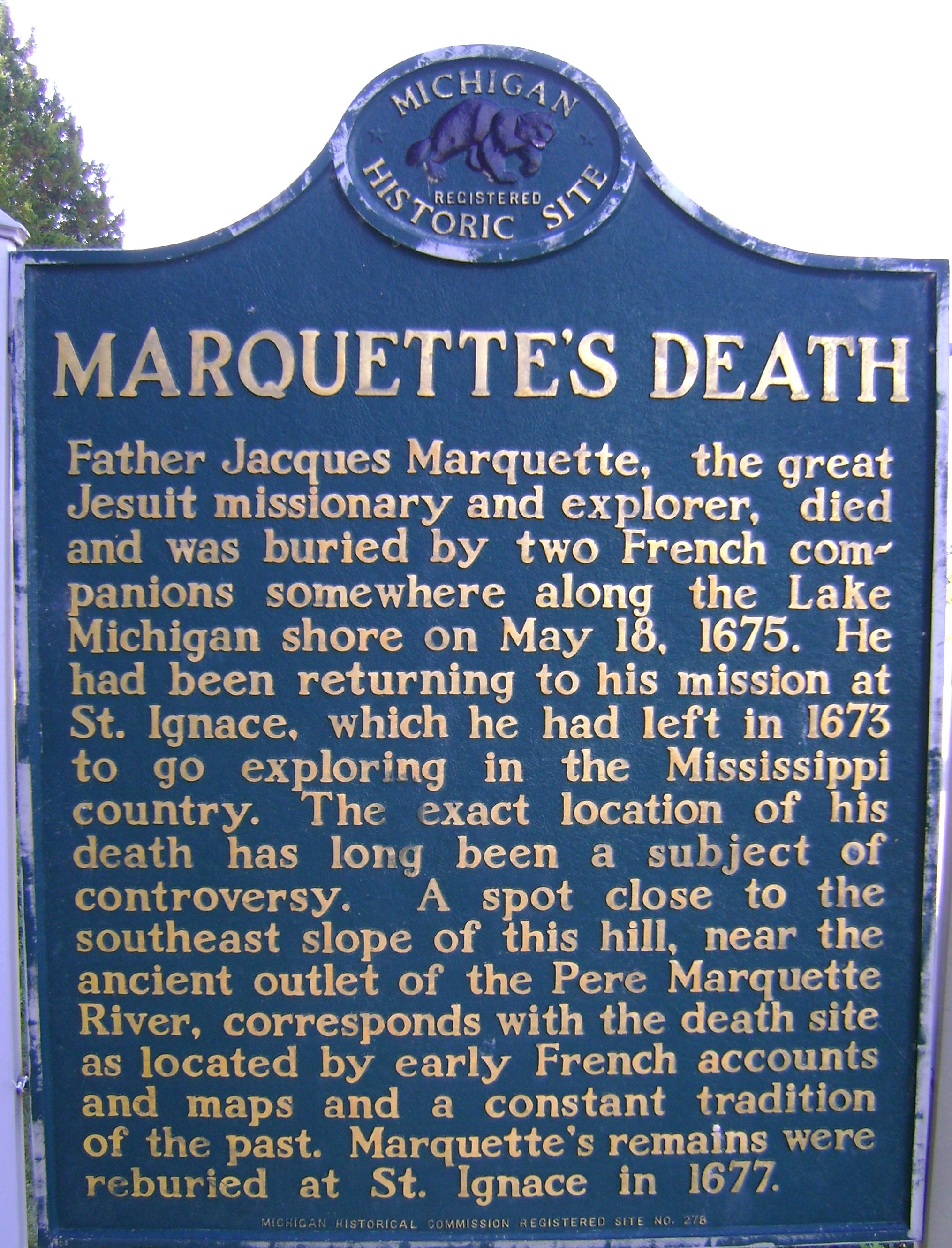
Michigan Historical Marker: "Marquette's Death"

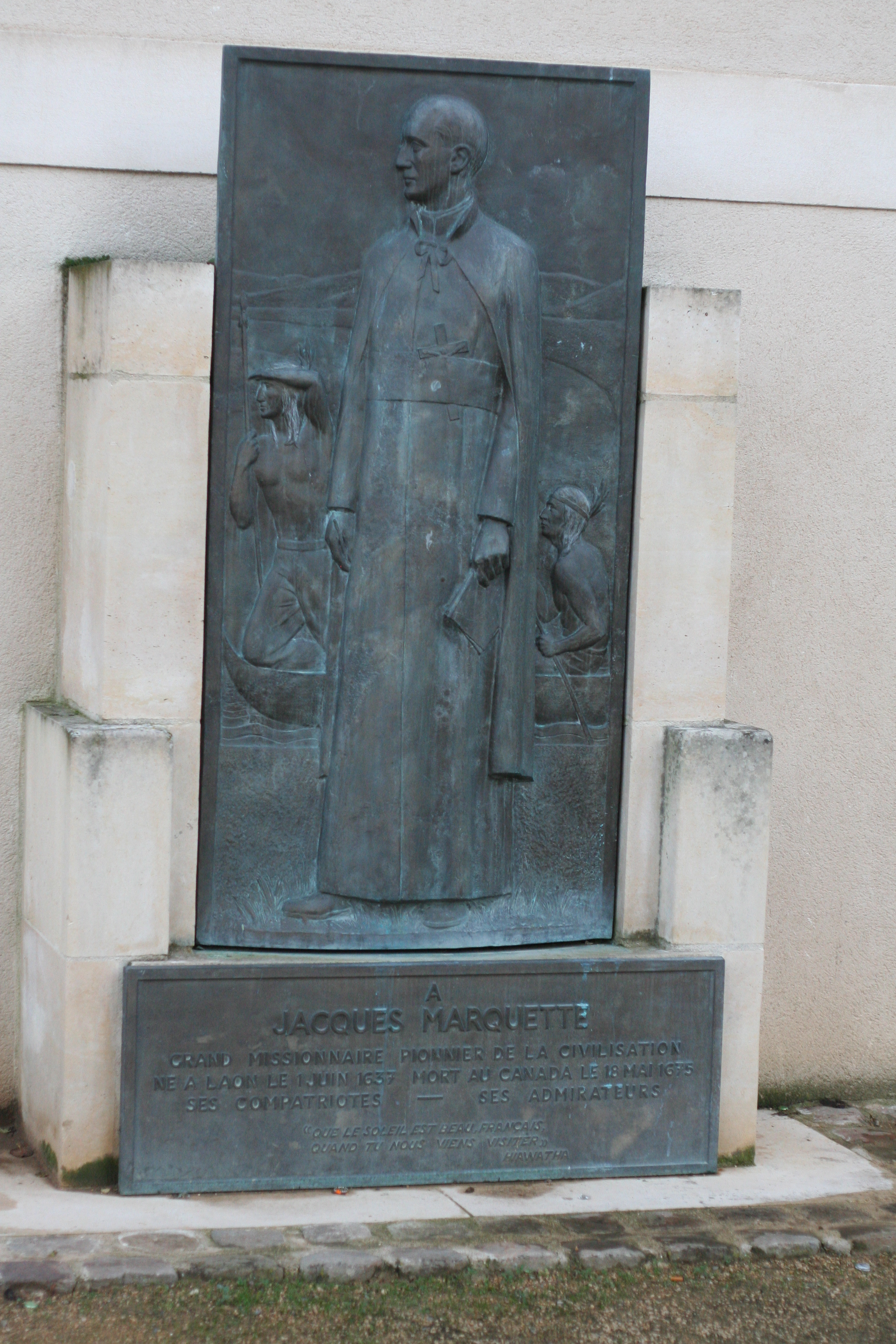
Memorial to Marquette in his birthplace of Laon, France

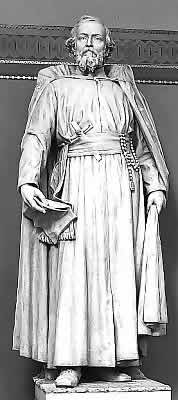
Gaetano Trentanove's Marquette statue at the United States Capitol

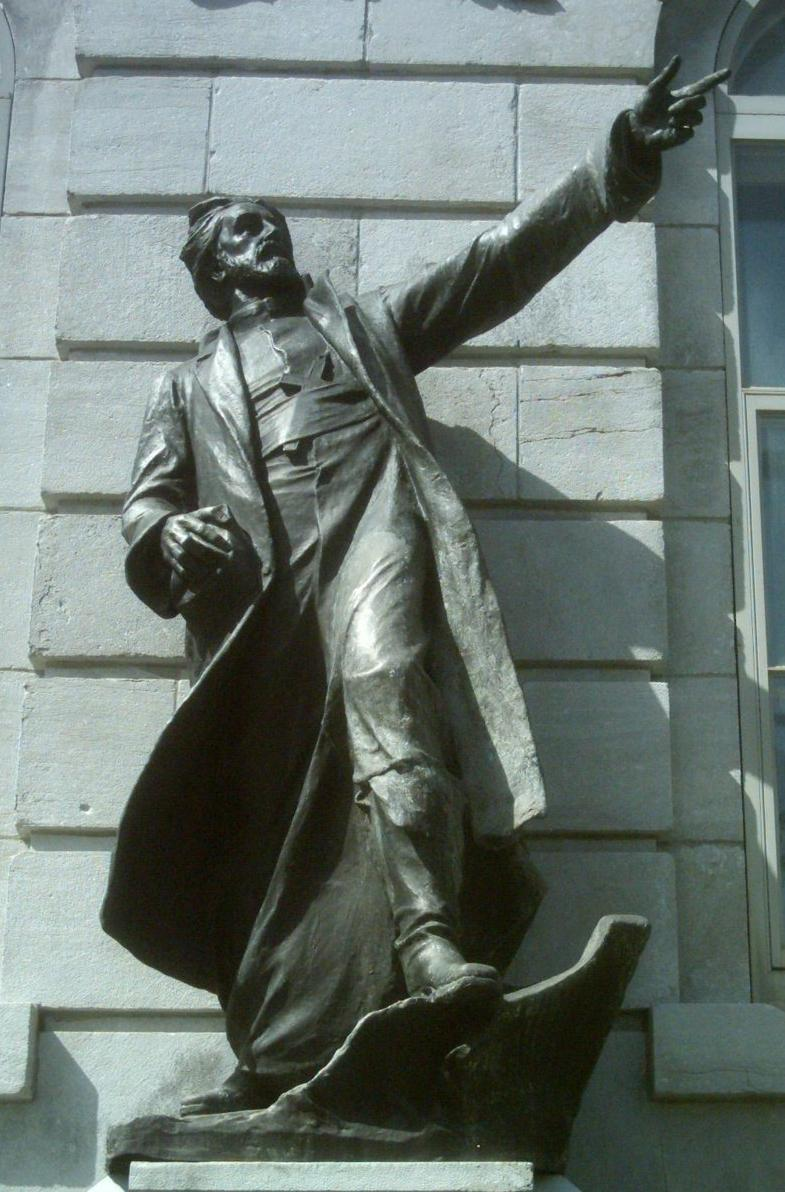
Alfred Laliberté's Marquette sculpture at Quebec Parliament Building

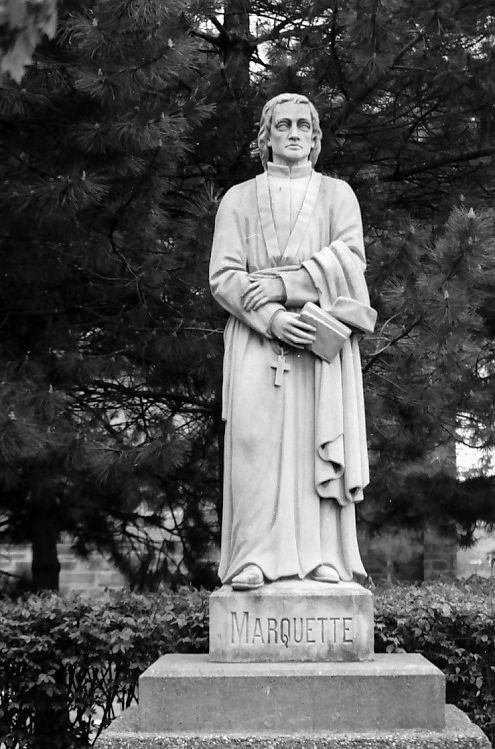
Statue of Marquette in Detroit, Michigan

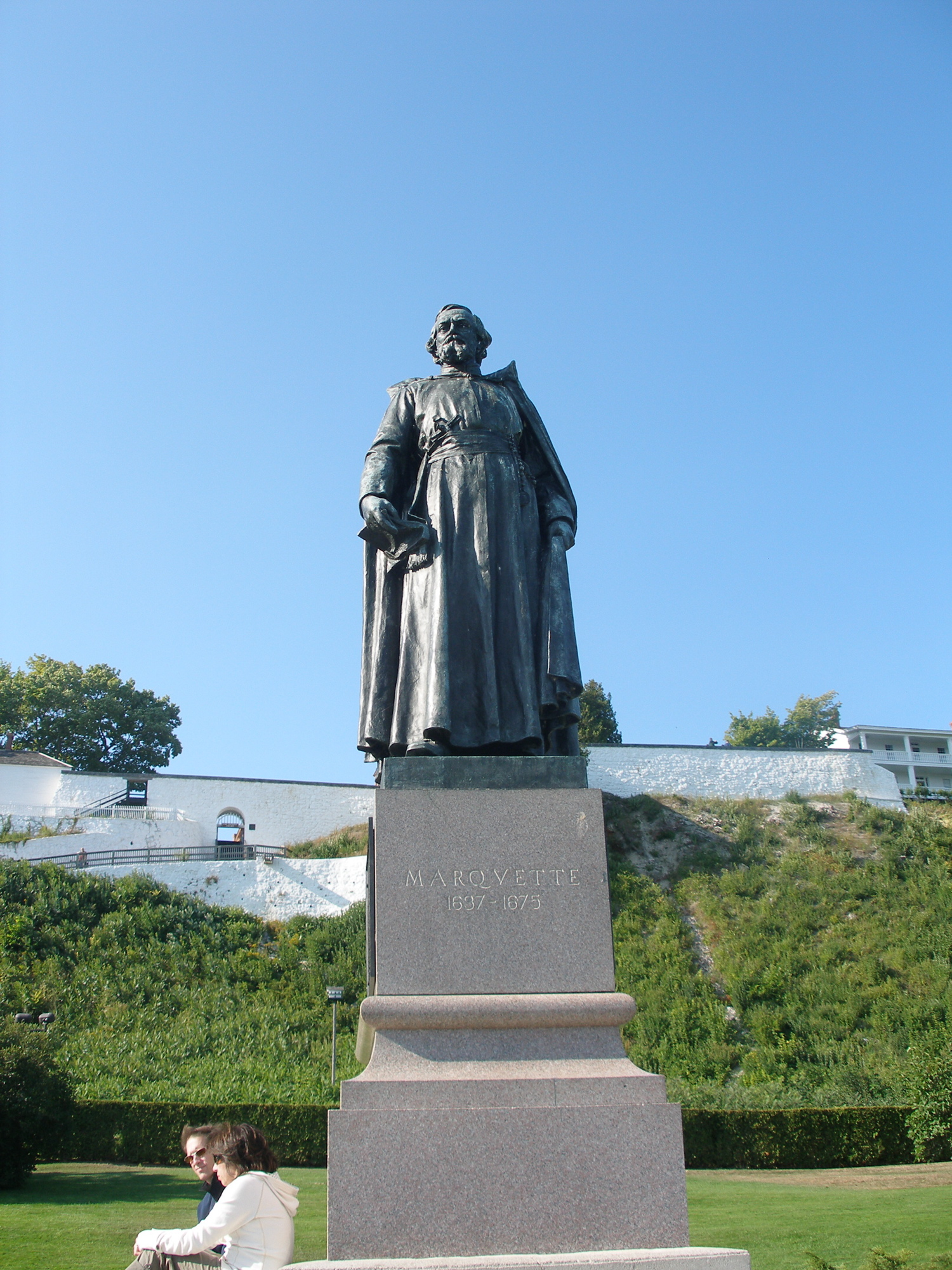
Statue of Marquette at Fort Mackinac

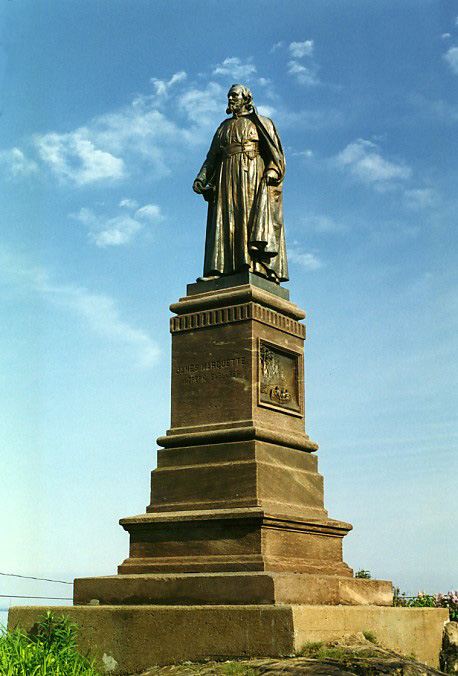
Statue of Marquette in Marquette, Michigan

Statue of Marquette in Prairie du Chien, Wisconsin

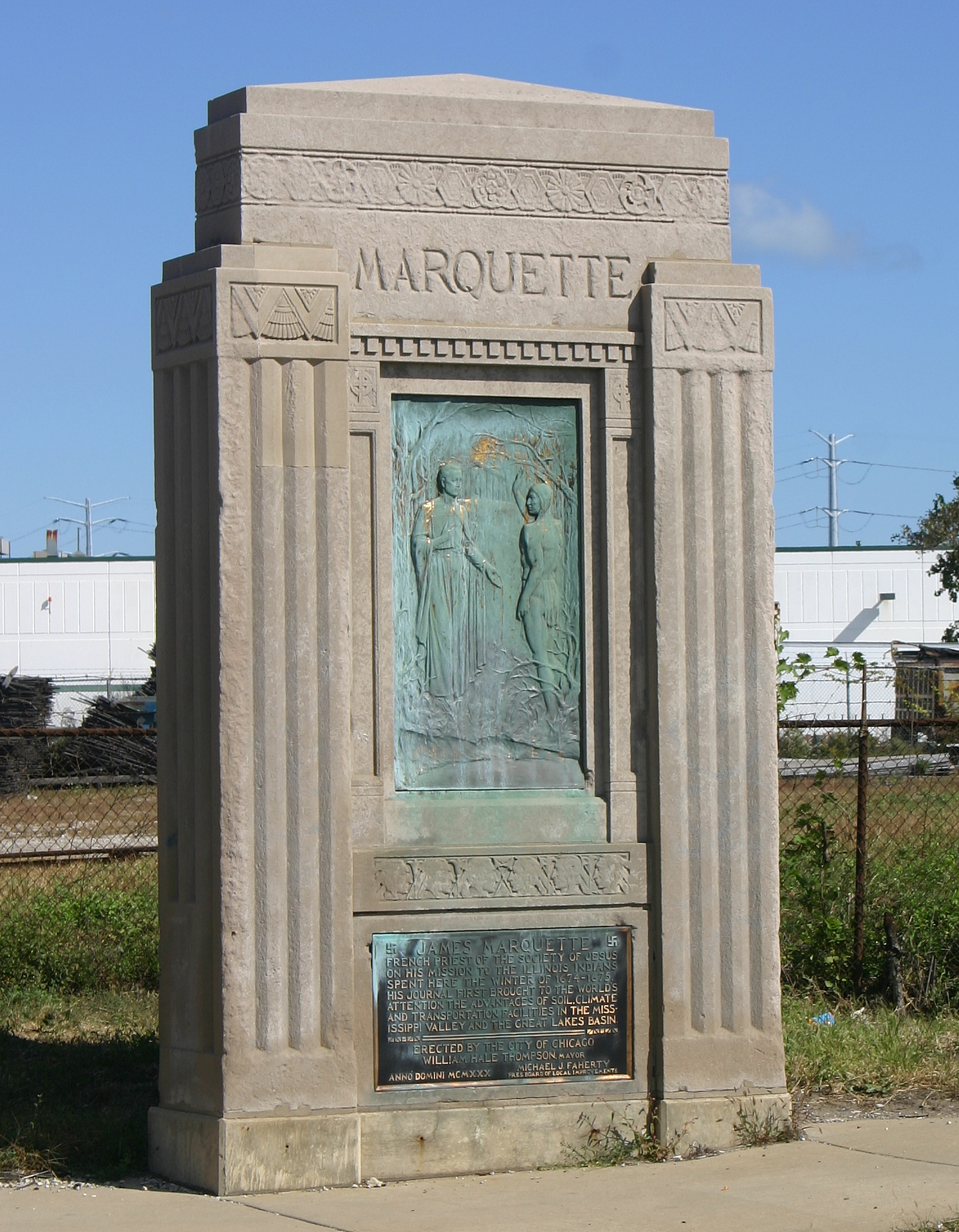
Marker commemorating Marquette's wintering location in 1674–75, today in Chicago

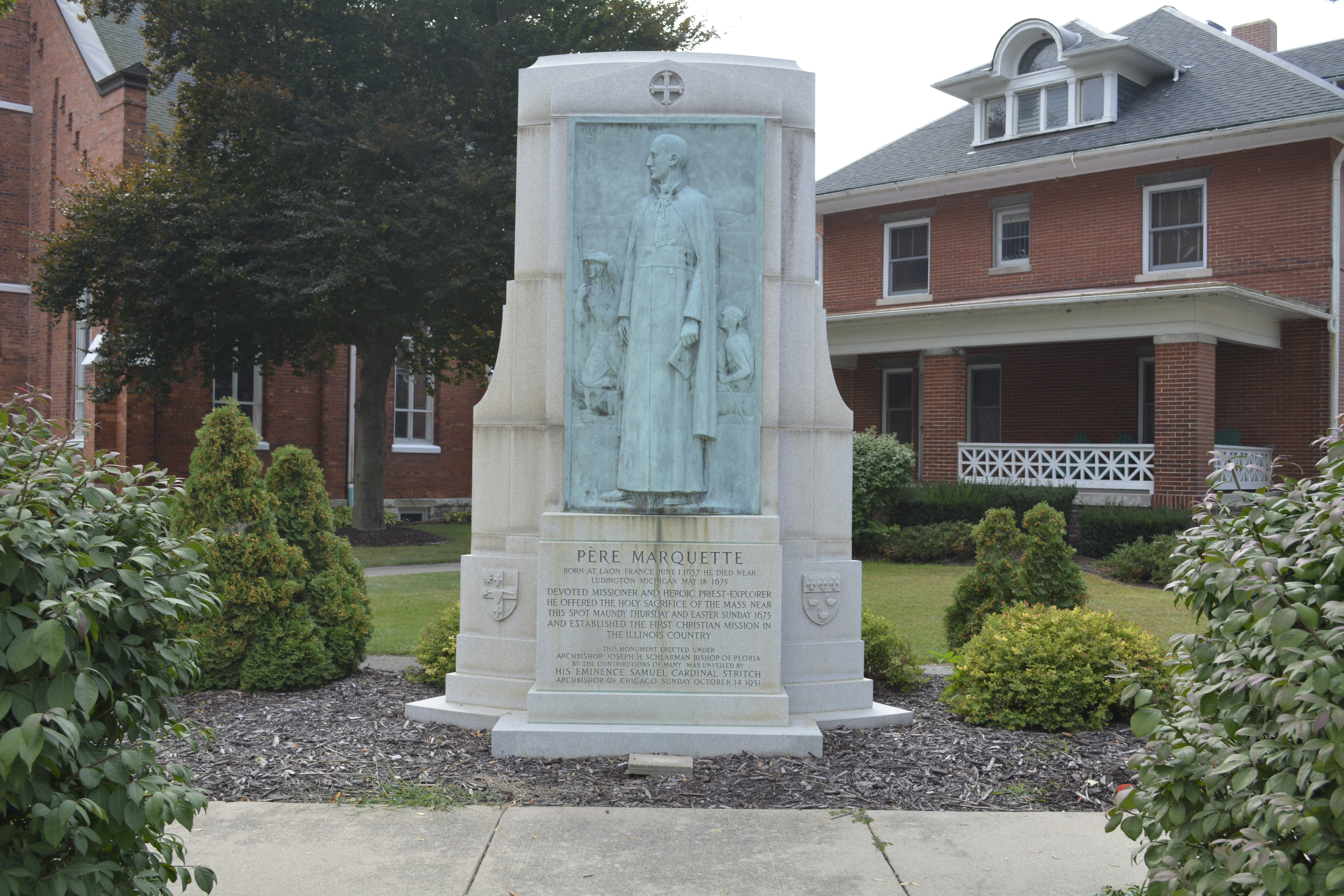
Pere Marquette Memorial in Utica, Illinois

== See also ==
- Jacques Marquette (sculpture), a 2005 public art work by artist Ronald Knepper
- Pere Jacques Marquette (Queoff), a 1987 public art work by Tom Queoff
- Sagamite
- Marquette (disambiguation) for other places, buildings and geographic objects named after Marquette
- Chicago Portage
- Chicago Portage National Historic Site
