= SS Marquette =

SS Marquette is the name of the following ships:

- SS Marquette (1881)
- SS Marquette (1897)
- SS Marquette, the original name of USS Neshanic before launch in 1942
- SS Marquette & Bessemer No. 2, a train ferry that sank in Lake Erie in 1909

== See also ==
- Marquette (disambiguation)
