= Palluau (disambiguation) =

Palluau is a commune in the Vendée department in the Pays de la Loire region in western France.

Palluau may also refer to:

- Palluau Lake, Quebec, Canada
- Palluau-sur-Indre, a commune in the Indre department in central France
