= Palluau Lake =

Lake in Lac-Ashuapmushuan, Quebec, Canada

- Location within Quebec
- Location: Le Domaine-du-Roy (RCM)
- Coordinates: 48°56′44″N 74°03′06″W
- Type: Natural
- Primary inflows: (clockwise); outlet of lake Morache; outlet of lakes Macau, Saléon, Porta, Bonas, Coursy, Livaie and lake Jaune; outlet of lake Theix.
- Primary outflows: Marquette River West
- Basin countries: Canada
- Max. length: 7.6 kilometres (4.7 mi)
- Max. width: 1.4 kilometres (0.87 mi)
- Surface elevation: 438 metres (1,437 ft)

The Palluau Lake is a freshwater body of the Lac-Ashuapmushuan, Quebec unorganized territory in the Regional County Municipality (RCM) Le Domaine-du-Roy, north-west of Saguenay-Lac-Saint-Jean administrative region, in province of Quebec, in Canada.

This lake is included entirely in the Township of Buade. The Palluau Lake is located on the west side outside the boundary of the Ashuapmushuan Wildlife Reserve. It is about halfway between Marquette Lake (located in the East) and Frontenac Lake (Milieu River) (located on the West side).

Forestry is the main economic activity of the sector. Recreational tourism activities come second.

The forest road R0212 (East-West) passes the north side of Lake Palluau. It will join to the East, the route 167 connecting Chibougamau and Saint-Félicien, Quebec, as well as the railway of the Canadian National Railway. Other secondary forest roads serve the southern vicinity of the lake.

The surface of Lac Palluau is usually frozen from early November to mid-May, however, safe ice circulation is generally from mid-November to mid-April.

== Geography ==
This lake has a length of 7.6 kilometres (4.7 mi) oriented north-west, a maximum width of 1.1 kilometres (0.68 mi) and an altitude of 438 metres (1,437 ft). The Palluau Lake has a rather complex shape with four parts separated by peninsulas, the longest of which stretches southward on 2.0 kilometres (1.2 mi), separating Northeast Bay from the bay leading to the mouth.

The mouth of Lac Palluau is located at:

- 53.9 kilometres (33.5 mi) northeast of a bay of Gouin Reservoir;
- 21.9 kilometres (13.6 mi) south-west of the confluence of the Marquette River West with the Marquette River;
- 30 kilometres (19 mi) South of the mouth of the Marquette River (confluence with the Ashuapmushuan River);
- 119.5 kilometres (74.3 mi) west of the mouth of the Ashuapmushuan River (confluence with lac Saint-Jean);
- 161.7 kilometres (100.5 mi) west of the mouth of lac Saint-Jean (confluence with the Saguenay River);
- 323.7 kilometres (201.1 mi) west of the mouth of the Saguenay River (confluence with the Estuary of Saint Lawrence).

The main hydrographic slopes near Lac Palluau are:

- North side: Marquette River West, Poutrincourt Lake, Normandin River;
- East side: Marquette River, Marquette Lake, La Tombelle Lake;
- South side: Loup River West (Ashuapmushuan Lake), Wabano River West, Berlinguet Creek, Cajeux Creek;
- West side: Frontenac Lake (Milieu River), Normandin River, Little Buade Lake, Buade Lake (Normandin River), Maskoskanaw River.
From the mouth of Palluau Lake, the current flows through the Loup River West (Ashuapmushuan Lake) flowing over 45.5 kilometres (28.3 mi) generally to the north and then to the east to its confluence with the Marquette River. From there, it flows northeast on 21.1 kilometres (13.1 mi) to its confluence with Ashuapmushuan Lake. Then the current flows along the Ashuapmushuan River which flows over 193 kilometres (120 mi) to the northeast, then to the South-East to its confluence with the lac Saint-Jean where it empties on the West Bank at Saint-Félicien, Quebec.

== Toponymy ==
The toponym "Lac Palluau" was formalized on December 5, 1968, by the Commission de toponymie du Québec, when it was created.

== See also ==
- Saguenay River
- Lac Saint-Jean, a body of water
- Ashuapmushuan River, a watercourse
- Marquette River, a watercourse
- Marquette River West, a watercourse
- Le Domaine-du-Roy, a regional county municipality (MRC)
- Lac-Ashuapmushuan, Quebec, an unorganized territory
- List of lakes in Canada
