= Frontenac Lake (Milieu River) =

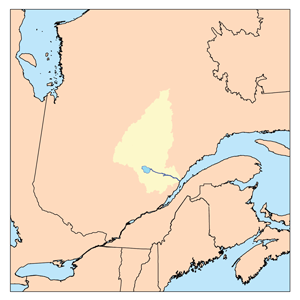
- Watershed of Saguenay River

- Location within Quebec
- Location: Le Domaine-du-Roy (RCM)
- Coordinates: 48°56′32″N 74°07′04″W
- Type: Natural
- Primary inflows: (clockwise); Maskoskanaw River; outlet of lake du Tétras Sombre; outlet of a set of lakes such Secondat, St-Nom, de la Voûte, du Savon, du Canso, Fonches, Watter, du Cerf, Janzé, Austin, Maclas, Beaussier and Taylor; outlet of lake Gascon; outlet of lake Daudier.
- Primary outflows: Poutrincourt Lake, Milieu River (Normandin River)
- Basin countries: Canada
- Max. length: 6.6 kilometres (4.1 mi)
- Max. width: 1.9 kilometres (1.2 mi)
- Surface elevation: 427 metres (1,401 ft)

Frontenac Lake is a freshwater body of the Lac-Ashuapmushuan, Quebec unorganized territory in the northwestern part of the Regional County Municipality (RCM) Le Domaine-du-Roy in the region of Saguenay-Lac-Saint-Jean, in the province of Quebec, in Canada. This lake extends entirely in the canton of Buade.

Forestry is the main economic activity of the sector. Recreational tourism activities come second.

The forest road R0212 (East–west direction) cuts the middle of the course of the Milieu River (Normandin River). While the forest road R0223 serves the Valley of the Marquette River West, on the west side of Poutrincourt Lake. This last road connects to the Northeast at route 167 linking Chibougamau and Saint-Félicien, Quebec. The Canadian National Railway runs along this last road.

The surface of Lake Frontenac is usually frozen from early November to mid-May, however, safe ice circulation is generally from mid-November to mid-April.

== Geography ==
The lake Frontenac has a length of 6.6 kilometres (4.1 mi), a maximum width of 1.9 kilometres (1.2 mi) and an altitude of 427 metres (1,401 ft). A peninsula detaches itself from the west shore, near the mouth of the dump (coming from the West) of Secondat Lake and stretches out on 1.1 kilometres (0.68 mi) towards the East, either towards the lake center. The northern part of the lake looks like a goalie hockey stick.

The mouth of Lake Frontenac is located at:

- 13.2 kilometres (8.2 mi) south of the mouth of the Milieu River (Normandin River) (confluence with Poutrincourt Lake);
- 28.1 kilometres (17.5 mi) South of the mouth of Poutrincourt Lake which is crossed by the Normandin River towards the North;
- 42.3 kilometres (26.3 mi) south of the mouth of Nicabau Lake whose southern part is crossed by the Normandin River;
- 34.3 kilometres (21.3 mi) south-west of the mouth of the Normandin River (confluence with Ashuapmushuan Lake

The main hydrographic slopes adjacent to Lake Frontenac are:

- North side: Milieu River (Normandin River), Ressaut Lake, Poutrincourt Lake, Normandin River;
- East side: Palluau Lake, Maskoskanaw River, Marquette River, Ashuapmushuan River;
- South side: Galinée Lake, Patterson Lake, Maskoskanaw River, Berlinguet Lake, Berlinguet Creek;
- West side: Secondat Lake, Little Buade Lake, Normandin Lake (Normandin River), Normandin River.

The Maskoskanaw River empties into a bay on the east shore of Lake Frontenac, which runs through the North 4.4 kilometres (2.7 mi) to its mouth. From there, the current flows down the Milieu River (Normandin River) on the north, to the south shore of the Poutrincourt Lake, which the current crosses on 15.4 kilometres (9.6 mi) to the North.

Downstream from Poutrincourt Lake, the current flows northward on 15.6 kilometres (9.7 mi), forming a 2.0 kilometres (1.2 mi) eastward hook to South Bay of Nicabau Lake; then, 5.3 kilometres (3.3 mi), i.e. 18 kilometres (11 mi) north, then east across the southern part of Nicabau Lake (elevation: 386 metres (1,266 ft)). From there, the current flows south-east along the Normandin River on 38.7 kilometres (24.0 mi) to the northwestern shore of Ashuapmushuan Lake. Then, the current flows through the Ashuapmushuan River which flows to Saint-Félicien, Quebec on the west shore of Lac Saint-Jean.

== Toponymy ==
The toponym "Lac Frontenac" was formalized on December 5, 1968, by the Commission de toponymie du Québec, at the creation of this commission.

== See also ==
- Lac Saint-Jean, a body of water
- Ashuapmushuan River, a watercourse
- Ashuapmushuan Lake, a body of water
- Normandin River, a watercourse
- Poutrincourt Lake, a body of water
- Maskoskanaw River, a watercourse
- Le Domaine-du-Roy, a regional county municipality (MRC)
- Lac-Ashuapmushuan, Quebec, an unorganized territory
- List of lakes in Canada
