= Gabriel Druillettes =

French Jesuit priest, explorer, missionary and diplomat

Gabriel Druillettes S.J. (also spelled Dreuillettes, Drouillettes, Drouillet, Droulletes, Drueillettes, Druilletes; 29 September 1610 – 8 April 1681) was a French Jesuit priest in New France who was an explorer, missionary to First Nations peoples and a diplomat. He is sometimes called the "Apostle of Maine".

== Life ==
Gabriel Druillettes was born 29 September 1610 at Garat, France. He entered the novitiate of the Society of Jesus on 28 July 1629 at Toulouse. After completing his course in theology, he was ordained priest in 1641 or 1642. He sailed to New France on 15 August 1643.

Druillettes was to accompany Jean de Brébeuf to the Huron country, but was detained at Quebec by the Iroquois blockade. He was sent instead to Sillery to learn Montagnais. The Christian Montagnais asked him to go hunting with them. Druillettes suffered greatly from the smoke of the lodges, which damaged his sight. In the midst of saying Mass one day, his sight improved. Druillettes made it his custom to winter with the First Nations hunters. During the summer, he worked at the mission at Tadoussac.

In 1646, the Abenaki of the Kennebec River basin requested a missionary. Druillettes was sent from Sillery in late August. He quickly learned their language and visited the Abenaki villages and the English settlements. He ascended the Chaudière, reached what is now Moosehead Lake by portage, and then entered the Kennebec. Continuing down the river he arrived at the English post of Coussinoc, now Augusta, Maine around Michaelmas, where he met the agent, John Winslow, who became his life-long friend.

From Coussinoc, Druillettes journeyed on until he reached the sea and then travelled along the coast as far as the Penobscot, where he was welcomed by the Capuchins who had established a mission there. Druillettes made a great impression on his travels as he was widely perceived as having an extraordinary gift for healing. He established a mission on the Kennebec about a league above Coussinoc that later grew into Norridgewock.

In 1650, Druillettes left Quebec as an envoy of the Government to negotiate a treaty at Boston with the Massachusetts Bay Colony for commercial purposes, as well as for mutual protection against the Iroquois. He was received with great kindness by the principal men in the English colonies, notably by the missionary John Eliot, and by Major-General Gibbons, who kept him at his house. Shea is of the opinion that Druillettes said Mass privately in Boston, in December 1650.

In 1651 Druillettes was part of a second embassy on behalf of the governor of Quebec. Druillettes's party arrived in New Haven, Connecticut in early September to meet with Commissioners of the United Colonies of New England. While the negotiations did not result in a formal treaty, they did establish relatively friendly relations between the French and the English Puritans.

After he laboured among the Montagnais Indians, and at Sillery and Three Rivers. In 1658 he embarked with Father Garreau on an Indian flotilla to go to the Ottawas near Lake Superior; but the party was attacked near Montreal, Garreau was slain, and the expedition seems to have been abandoned.

In 1661 Druillettes joined Father Claude Dablon on an expedition overland to Hudson Bay, the purpose of which was to establish missions among the First Nations people in that region and perhaps to discover an outlet through Hudson Bay to China. They paddled up the Saguenay, reached Lake St. John and continued their course up a tributary, which they called the River of the Blessed Sacrament, finally coming to Kekouba, which was 29 days from Tadoussac. As the Indians refused to go any farther north and the country offered no prospect of a mission the travelers returned to Quebec. The expedition was unsuccessful and is only chronicled as another abortive attempt to find the famous Northwest Passage.

In 1670 Druillettes was at Sault Sainte Marie and was one of those who participated with Claude-Jean Allouez and Jacques Marquette in the famous "taking possession" of the country by Simon-François Daumont de Saint-Lusson in May 1671. Druillettes laboured chiefly among the Mississaugas, besides attending to other dependent missions towards Green Bay.

Druillettes was regarded as a man of great sanctity, and miracles were attributed to him. He was remarkable for his knowledge of the indigenous languages. Joseph Marquette, before going west, was sent to study Algonquin under Druillettes's direction at Three Rivers. His work among the First Nations peoples extended over a period of thirty-eight years.

Druillettes died at Quebec on 8 April 1681.
