= Sagamite =

American stew

- Type: Stew
- Main ingredients: Hominy or Indian corn and grease; vegetables, wild rice, brown sugar, beans, smoked fish or animal brains

Sagamité is a Native American stew made from hominy, cornmeal, or Indian corn and grease (from animal fat). Additional ingredients may include vegetables, wild rice, brown sugar, beans, smoked fish or animal brains.

Caddo sagamité was thick soup made from corn flour that had previously been parched and ground into a fine meal. Beans and acorn flour could be added. The Caddos served the stew in large earthenware pots for crowds during ceremonies.

Sagamité was used in ceremonies to celebrate welcomed guests by tribes such as the Peoria, Wendat, Wyandot, Osage, and early Caddo tribes of Arkansas. According to the Illinois State Museum, the Peoria fed sagamité to explorers Father Jacques Marquette and Louis Joliet during the explorers’ 1673 journey to the Mississippi River, as Marquette mentions in his journal of the voyage.

== See also ==
- Atole
- Cornbread
- List of maize dishes
- List of stews
