= Maskoskanaw River =

Maskoskanaw
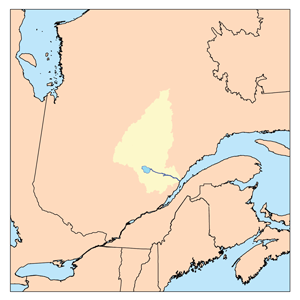
- Watershed of Saguenay River

Location
- Country: Canada
- Province: Quebec
- Region: Saguenay-Lac-Saint-Jean

Physical characteristics
- Source: Malsain Lake
  - location: Lac-Ashuapmushuan, Quebec, Le Domaine-du-Roy (RCM), Saguenay-Lac-Saint-Jean, Quebec
  - coordinates: 48°51′21″N 74°11′22″W
  - elevation: 460 m (1,510 ft)
- Mouth: Frontenac Lake (Milieu River)
  - location: Lac-Ashuapmushuan, Quebec, Le Domaine-du-Roy (RCM), Saguenay-Lac-Saint-Jean, Quebec
  - coordinates: 48°56′33″N 74°06′18″W
  - elevation: 427 m (1,401 ft)
- Length: 24.4 km (15.2 mi)

Basin features
- Tributaries
  - left: (upstream); outlet of a set of lakes Hobue and Forton; outlet of lake Mystérieux; outlet of lakes Gif, de la Cîme and Musicat; outlet of lake Lye.
  - right: (upstream); outlet of lake Arvida; outlet of lake Farlant; outlet of Lake Patricid; outlet of lake Surprise; outlet of lake Jabot; outlet of lakes Rainoir, Brenard and Bruce; outlet of lake Loubier; outlet of lakes Huard, Gomer, Frégeau, Ézy, Maud, Petit lac Maud, des Verdiers and des Îles Rocheuses.

Maskoskanaw River is a tributary of Frontenac Lake (Milieu River), flowing into the unorganized territory of Lac-Ashuapmushuan, Quebec, in the Regional County Municipality (MRC) of Le Domaine-du-Roy, in the administrative region of Saguenay-Lac-Saint-Jean, in Quebec, in Canada.

The Maskoskanaw River flows successively into the townships of Huard and Buade. Forestry is the main economic activity of this valley; recreational tourism activities, second.

The forest road R0212 (East-West direction) cuts the middle of the course of the Milieu River (Normandin River). The route 451 linking La Tuque to Obedjiwan, Quebec passes south of Patterson Lake; several secondary road branches serving the surroundings of this head lake.

The surface of the Maskoskanaw River is usually frozen from early November to mid-May, however, safe ice movement is generally from mid-November to mid-April.

== Geography ==
The adjacent hydrographic slopes of the Maskoskanaw River are:
- north side: Frontenac Lake (Milieu River), Milieu River (Normandin River), Poutrincourt Lake, Normandin River;
- east side: Marquette River West, Marquette River, Marquette Lake;
- south side: Berlinguet Lake, Berlinguet Creek, Gouin Reservoir, Wapous River;
- west side: Normandin Lake (Normandin River), Normandin River, Gouin Reservoir, Magnan Lake, Pokotciminike River.

The Maskoskanaw River originates at the mouth of the Malsain Lake (length: 0.9 kilometres (0.56 mi); width: 0.2 kilometres (0.12 mi); altitude: 502 metres (1,647 ft)) located in Huard Township. The mouth of this head lake is located at:

- 11.1 kilometres (6.9 mi) south of the mouth of the "Maskoskanaw River" (confluence with Frontenac Lake (Milieu River));
- 26.7 kilometres (16.6 mi) south of the mouth of the Milieu River (Normandin River) (confluence with Poutrincourt Lake);
- 40.7 kilometres (25.3 mi) south of the mouth of Poutrincourt Lake which is crossed by the Normandin River towards the North;
- 55.6 kilometres (34.5 mi) south of the mouth of Nicabau Lake whose southern portion is crossed by the Normandin River;
- 48.2 kilometres (30.0 mi) south-west of the mouth of the Normandin River (confluence with Ashuapmushuan Lake.

From the mouth of the Malsain Lake, the "Maskoskanaw River" flows over 24.4 kilometres (15.2 mi), according to the following segments:

Upper Maskoskanaw River (segment of 13.1 kilometres (8.1 mi)

- 1.5 kilometres (0.93 mi) north-east, crossing the Canelier Lake at 0.2 kilometres (0.12 mi) (length: 0.8 kilometres (0.50 mi); altitude: 502 metres (1,647 ft)) and on 0.1 kilometres (0.062 mi) the southwestern part of Black Lake (length: 1.0 kilometre (0.62 mi); altitude: 490 metres (1,610 ft)), to its mouth;
- 1.4 kilometres (0.87 mi) south, then east, crossing the southern part of Serpent Lake at 0.2 kilometres (0.12 mi) to its mouth;
- 3.1 kilometres (1.9 mi) southerly crossing Lake Camp (elevation: 468 metres (1,535 ft)) to its mouth;
- 2.4 kilometres (1.5 mi) forming a large open U towards the North, to the discharge (coming from the South-West) of Lakes Brenard, Rainoir, Morion and Jabot;
- 4.0 kilometres (2.5 mi) northeasterly across Patterson Lake (elevation: 460 kilometres (290 mi)) along its full length to its mouth. Note: This lake is mainly fed by the discharge (coming from the North-West) of the lakes of Cîme and Musicat. This lake has a strait of 0.7 kilometres (0.43 mi) that connects the Southwest to the Northeast.

Lower Maskoskanaw River (segment of 11.3 kilometres (7.0 mi)

- 2.4 kilometres (1.5 mi) northeasterly to the southwest shore of Ranger Lake;
- 2.6 kilometres (1.6 mi) northeasterly across Ranger Lake (elevation: 453 kilometres (281 mi)) along its full length to its mouth;
- 2.4 kilometres (1.5 mi) northwesterly, forming a hook westward to the edge of Huard and Buade Townships;
- 3.9 kilometres (2.4 mi) northwesterly in Huard Township, in a widening of the river, to the mouth of the river.

The confluence of the "Maskoskanaw River" with the Frontenac Lake (Milieu River) is located at:

- 3.0 kilometres (1.9 mi) south of the mouth of Frontenac Lake (Milieu River);
- 16.2 kilometres (10.1 mi) south of the mouth of the Milieu River (Normandin River);
- 31.0 kilometres (19.3 mi) South of the mouth of Poutrincourt Lake which is crossed by the Normandin River towards the North;
- 34.6 kilometres (21.5 mi) northeast of a bay of Gouin Reservoir which is the headwater body of the Saint-Maurice River;
- 45.4 kilometres (28.2 mi) south-west of the mouth of Nicabau Lake, the southern portion of which is crossed by the Normandin River;
- 36.7 kilometres (22.8 mi) south-west of the mouth of the Normandin River (confluence with Ashuapmushuan Lake;
- 132.7 kilometres (82.5 mi) west of the mouth of the Ashuapmushuan River (confluence with lac Saint-Jean).

The Maskoskanaw River flows to the bottom of a bay on the eastern shore of Frontenac Lake (Milieu River) (length: 6.6 kilometres (4.1 mi); maximum Width: 1.9 kilometres (1.2 mi); altitude: 427 metres (1,401 ft)) that the current flows northward 4.4 kilometres (2.7 mi) to its mouth. From there, the current flows down the Milieu River (Normandin River) on the north, to the south shore of the Poutrincourt Lake, which the current crosses on 15.4 kilometres (9.6 mi) to the North.

Downstream from Poutrincourt Lake, the current flows northward on 15.6 kilometres (9.7 mi), forming a 2.0 kilometres (1.2 mi) eastward hook, to the south bay of Nicabau Lake; then, 5.3 kilometres (3.3 mi) to the North and then to the East, crossing the southern part of Nicabau Lake (altitude: 386 m). From there, the current flows south-east along the Normandin River on 38.7 kilometres (24.0 mi) to the northwestern shore of Ashuapmushuan Lake. Then, the current flows through the Ashuapmushuan River which flows to Saint-Félicien, Quebec on the west shore of Lac Saint-Jean.

== Toponymy ==
The toponym "Maskoskanaw River" was formalized on September 6, 1984, at the Commission de toponymie du Québec.

== See also ==
- Saguenay River
- Lac Saint-Jean, a body of water
- Ashuapmushuan River, a watercourse
- Ashuapmushuan Lake, a body of water
- Normandin River, a watercourse
- Nicabau Lake, a body of water
- Poutrincourt Lake, a body of water
- Milieu River (Normandin River), a watercourse
- Frontenac Lake (Milieu River), a body of water
- Lac-Ashuapmushuan, Quebec, an unorganized territory
- Le Domaine-du-Roy, a regional county municipality (MRC)
- List of rivers of Quebec
