= Claude Dablon =

Jesuit missionary in Canada

Claude Dablon (February 1618 – May 3, 1697) was a Jesuit missionary, born in Dieppe, France.

At the age of twenty-one he entered the Society of Jesus, and after his course of studies and teaching in France, arrived in Canada in 1655. He was at once dispatched with Pierre-Joseph-Marie Chaumonot to begin a central mission among the Iroquois at Onondaga. His diary gives an account of this journey and of his return to Quebec in the year following. Many of his diary notes were published during his lifetime in Jesuit Relations.

In 1661 he accompanied Gabriel Druillettes on an expedition overland to Hudson Bay, the purpose of which was to establish missions among the Native Americans in that region and perhaps to discover an outlet through Hudson Bay to China. The expedition was unsuccessful and is only chronicled as another abortive attempt to find the famous Northwest Passage.

In 1668 Dablon was on Lake Superior with Claude-Jean Allouez and Jacques Marquette, and he was the first to inform the world of the rich copper mines of that region, which later became so valuable to the Canadian economy. It was Dablon who appointed Marquette to undertake the expedition which resulted in the discovery of the Upper Mississippi River; he also gave Marquette's letters and charts to the world. In connection with this discovery he called attention to the feasibility of passing from Lake Erie to Florida "by cutting a canal through only half a league of prairie to pass from the end of the Lake of the Illinois (Lake Michigan) to the River of St. Louis" (the Illinois River). This canal, projected by Dablon, was built in the 1840s as the Illinois and Michigan Canal.

After founding Sault Ste. Marie, Dablon became, in 1671, Superior General of all the Canadian Missions, retaining that office until 1680. He was reappointed in 1686 and remained superior until 1693. His contributions to the "Relations" are historically valuable with his descriptions of places and people and his narration of events.
