= Mike Ford (cornerback) =

American football player (born 1995)

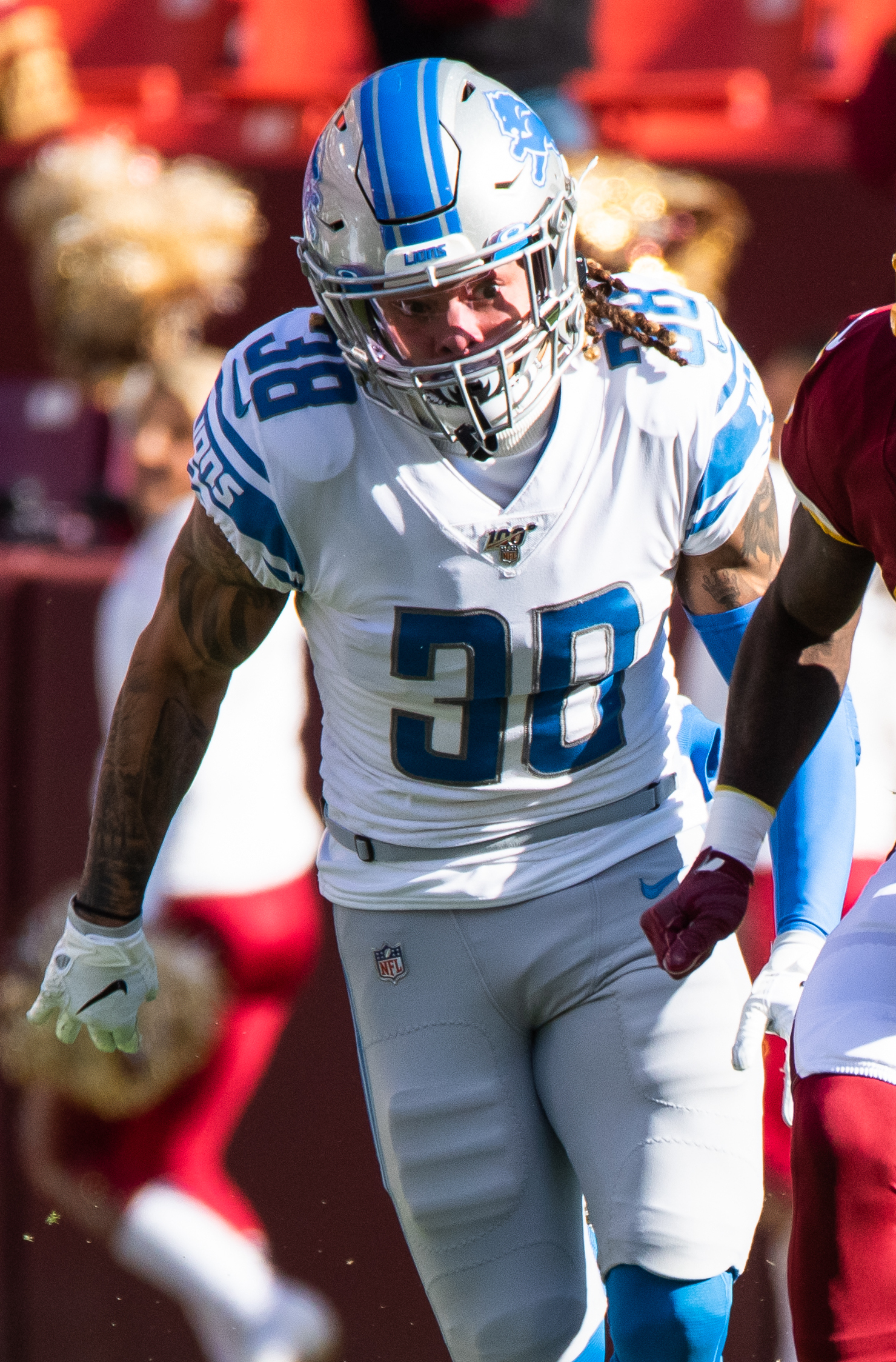
- Ford with the Detroit Lions in 2019

No. 28 – Atlanta Falcons
- Position: Cornerback
- Roster status: Active

Personal information
- Born: August 4, 1995 (age 31); St. Louis, Missouri, U.S.
- Listed height: 6 ft 0 in (1.83 m)
- Listed weight: 199 lb (90 kg)

Career information
- High school: Marquette Catholic (Alton, Illinois)
- College: Southeast Missouri State (2013–2017)
- NFL draft: 2018: undrafted

Career history
- Detroit Lions (2018–2020); Denver Broncos (2021); Atlanta Falcons (2022); Cleveland Browns (2023); Houston Texans (2024)*; Cleveland Browns (2024); Atlanta Falcons (2025–present)
- * Offseason or practice squad member only

Awards and highlights
- Second-team All-OVC (2015)

Career NFL statistics as of Week 5, 2026
- Total tackles: 135
- Fumble recoveries: 2
- Pass deflections: 6
- Interceptions: 1
- Stats at Pro Football Reference

Michael Ford Jr. (born August 4, 1995) is an American professional football cornerback for the Atlanta Falcons of the National Football League (NFL). He played college football for the Southeast Missouri State Redhawks.

== Early life ==
Ford was born and grew up in Alton, Illinois and attended Marquette Catholic High School, where he played both running back and defensive back for the Explorers football team. As a senior, Ford was named first-team all-conference on both offense and defense and All-State at running back after rushing for 1,614 yards and 28 touchdowns, scoring an additional five touchdowns on returns, and recording 69 tackles with two fumble recoveries and three interceptions on defense.

== College career ==
Ford spent five seasons at Southeast Missouri State University, redshirting his freshman season and playing wide receiver as a redshirt freshman. He was moved to defensive back at the beginning of his redshirt freshman season. As a redshirt sophomore, his first season as a starter, Ford made 44 tackles and had five interceptions and seven pass breakups and was named second-team All-Ohio Valley Conference. As a redshirt senior, Ford made 32 tackles with two sacks, an interception and 14 passes broken up.

== Professional career ==
Pre-draft measurables
Height	Weight	Arm length	Hand span	Wingspan	40-yard dash	10-yard split	20-yard split	20-yard shuttle	Three-cone drill	Vertical jump	Broad jump	Bench press
6 ft 0 1/8 in (1.83 m)	196 lb (89 kg)	30 1/8 in (0.77 m)	9 1/2 in (0.24 m)	6 ft 3 1/2 in (1.92 m)	4.47 s	1.54 s	2.55 s	4.15 s	6.63 s	40.0 in (1.02 m)	11 ft 0 in (3.35 m)	12 reps
All values from Pro Day

=== Detroit Lions ===
Ford signed with the Detroit Lions as an undrafted free agent on April 28, 2018. He failed to make the active roster out of training camp and was subsequently re-signed by the Lions to the team's practice squad on September 2. Ford was promoted to the Lions' active roster on November 14 after offensive guard T. J. Lang was placed on injured reserve. Ford made his NFL debut on November 18 when he started at cornerback and played on special teams in a 20–19 win over the Carolina Panthers, recording two tackles. In his rookie season, Ford played in seven games (four starts) with 25 tackles.

Ford played in 15 games with two starts during the 2019 season, recording 12 tackles and two passes defended. He was assigned a one-year tender with the Lions as an exclusive rights free agent on March 18, 2020. He signed the tender on April 21. He was placed on injured reserve on September 6. He was activated on October 24.

Ford signed a contract extension with the Lions on March 8, 2021. On August 30, Ford was waived by the Lions.

=== Denver Broncos ===
On September 1, 2021, Ford was claimed off waivers by the Denver Broncos. He was placed on injured reserve on October 16. He was activated on November 6.

=== Atlanta Falcons (first stint) ===
On April 8, 2022, Ford signed with the Atlanta Falcons.

=== Cleveland Browns (first stint) ===
On March 21, 2023, Ford signed with the Cleveland Browns.

=== Houston Texans ===
On March 15, 2024, Ford signed a two-year contract with the Houston Texans. He was released on August 27.

=== Cleveland Browns (second stint) ===
On August 29, 2024, Ford was signed to the Cleveland Browns practice squad. He was promoted to the active roster on September 11.

=== Atlanta Falcons (second stint) ===
On March 17, 2025, Ford signed with the Atlanta Falcons on a two-year contract.
