= Rivière du Milieu (Normandin River tributary) =

Du Milieu
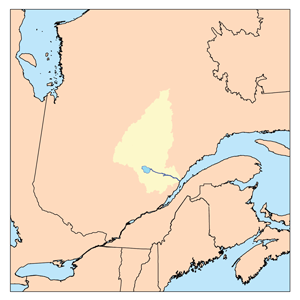
- Watershed of Saguenay River

Location
- Country: Canada
- Province: Quebec
- Region: Saguenay-Lac-Saint-Jean

Physical characteristics
- Source: Frontenac Lake (Milieu River)
  - location: Lac-Ashuapmushuan, Quebec, Le Domaine-du-Roy (RCM), Saguenay-Lac-Saint-Jean, Quebec
  - coordinates: 48°52′19″N 74°06′41″W
  - elevation: 460 m (1,510 ft)
- Mouth: Nicabau Lake
  - location: Lac-Ashuapmushuan, Quebec, Le Domaine-du-Roy (RCM), Saguenay-Lac-Saint-Jean, Quebec
  - coordinates: 49°05′19″N 74°06′36″W
  - elevation: 392 m (1,286 ft)
- Length: 17.8 km (11.1 mi)

Basin features
- Tributaries
  - left: (upstream); outlet of lake Tarzan; outlet of lake Lesgor; outlet of a set of lakes such Giffard, Sabine, de la Poloselle, Malléou, Voulton, Bagot, Gautron, Bethe, Trianon, Vif-Argent, articote, Jeannine, Jérôme, Fernand and Mingan; outlet of lakes Fanlac and Laborel; outlet of lakes Gazost and René; outlet of lake Védieu.
  - right: (upstream); outlet of lake Ahun; outlet of lake Cardet; outlet of lake Cronat; outlet of lakess Sinsat and Pluchon; outlet of lake Cléty.

Rivière du Milieu ('River of the middle') is a tributary of Poutrincourt Lake, flowing into the unorganized territory of Lac-Ashuapmushuan, Quebec, into the Regional County Municipality (RCM) of Le Domaine-du-Roy, in the administrative region of Saguenay-Lac-Saint-Jean, Quebec, Canada.

The Milieu River runs successively in the townships of Buade and Poutrincourt. Forestry is the main economic activity of this valley; recreational tourism activities, second.

Forest Road R0212 (East-West) intersects the middle of the river. While the forest road R0223 serves the Valley of the Marquette River West, on the west side of Poutrincourt Lake. This last road connects to the Northeast at route 167 linking Chibougamau and Saint-Félicien, Quebec. The Canadian National Railway runs along this road.

The surface of the Milieu River is usually frozen from early November to mid-May, however, safe ice circulation is generally from mid-November to mid-April.

== Geography ==
The surrounding hydrographic slopes of the Milieu River are:
- north side: Poutrincourt Lake, Nicabau Lake, Normandin River;
- east side: Marquette River West, Marquette River, Ashuapmushuan Lake;
- south side: Frontenac Lake (Milieu River), Normandin River, Gouin Reservoir;
- west side: Normandin River, Gouin Reservoir, Magnan Lake.

The Milieu River originates at the mouth of Frontenac Lake (Milieu River) (length: 6.6 kilometres (4.1 mi); width: 1.9 kilometres (1.2 mi); altitude: 427 metres (1,401 ft)) located in Buade Township. This lake is mainly fed by the Maskoskanaw River (coming from the East). The mouth of this head lake is located at:

- 13.2 kilometres (8.2 mi) South of the mouth of the Milieu River (confluence with the Poutrincourt Lake);
- 28.1 kilometres (17.5 mi) South of the mouth of Poutrincourt Lake which is crossed by the Normandin River towards the North;
- 42.3 kilometres (26.3 mi) south of the mouth of Nicabau Lake whose southern part is crossed by the Normandin River;
- 34.3 kilometres (21.3 mi) south-west of the mouth of the Normandin River (confluence with Ashuapmushuan Lake.

From the mouth of Frontenac Lake (Milieu River), the Milieu River flows over 17.8 kilometres (11.1 mi) through marsh areas, according to the following segments:

- 0.9 kilometres (0.56 mi) to the north, crossing the lake Florence (length: 1.6 kilometres (0.99 mi); altitude: 427 metres (1,401 ft)), to its mouth;
- 1.5 kilometres (0.93 mi) northwesterly, crossing Ressaut Lake (altitude: 430 metres (1,410 ft)) along its entire length, to the dam at its mouth;
- 8.9 kilometres (5.5 mi) north, to the outlet (from the southwest) of Giffard Lake and a series of upstream lakes;
- 3.0 kilometres (1.9 mi) northeasterly forming a loop to the southeast, to the limit of the townships of Poutrincourt and Buade;
- 3.5 kilometres (2.2 mi) North in the Township of Poutrincourt, to the mouth of the river.

The confluence of the Milieu River with the Poutrincourt Lake is located at:

- 14.8 kilometres (9.2 mi) south of the mouth of Poutrincourt Lake which is crossed by the Normandin River towards the North;
- 43.6 kilometres (27.1 mi) north-east of a bay of Gouin Reservoir which is the headwater body of the Saint-Maurice River;
- 29.2 kilometres (18.1 mi) south-west of the mouth of Nicabau Lake whose southern portion is crossed by the Normandin River;
- 26.2 kilometres (16.3 mi) south-west of the mouth of the Normandin River (confluence with Ashuapmushuan Lake;
- 137.2 kilometres (85.3 mi) west of the mouth of the Ashuapmushuan River (confluence with lac Saint-Jean).

The Milieu River flows to the bottom of a bay on the south shore of the eastern part of Poutrincourt Lake (length: 19.7 kilometres (12.2 mi); maximum width: 6.7 kilometres (4.2 mi); altitude: 392 metres (1,286 ft)). The Poutrincourt Lake is crossed on the North by the current of the Milieu River and on the North by the current of the Normandin River.

Downstream from Poutrincourt Lake, the current flows northward on 15.6 kilometres (9.7 mi), forming a 2.0 kilometres (1.2 mi) eastward hook to the south bay of Nicabau Lake; then, 5.3 kilometres (3.3 mi), ie 1.8 kilometres (1.1 mi) north, then east crossing the southern part of Nicabau Lake (elevation: 386 metres (1,266 ft)). From there, the current flows towards the South-East Normandin River.

== Toponymy ==
The toponym "Rivière du milieu" was formalized on March 28, 1972, at the Commission de toponymie du Québec.

== See also ==
- Estuary of Saint Lawrence
- Saguenay River
- Lac Saint-Jean, a body of water
- Ashuapmushuan River, a watercourse
- Ashuapmushuan Lake, a body of water
- Normandin River, a watercourse
- Nicabau Lake, a body of water
- Frontenac Lake (Milieu River)
- Maskoskanaw River
- Lac-Ashuapmushuan, Quebec, an unorganized territory
- Le Domaine-du-Roy, a regional county municipality (MRC)
- List of rivers of Quebec
