= Marquette High School =

Marquette High School may refer to a secondary school in the United States:

- Marquette High School (Iowa), a Catholic high school in Bellevue, Iowa
- Marquette High School (Missouri), a public high school in Chesterfield, Missouri

== See also ==
- Marquette Academy, a Catholic high school in Ottawa, Illinois
- Marquette Catholic High School (Illinois), in Alton, Illinois
- Marquette Catholic High School (Indiana), in Michigan City, Indiana
- Marquette Catholic Schools, formerly in West Point, Iowa
- Marquette Senior High School in Marquette, Michigan
- Marquette University High School, a Jesuit high school in Milwaukee, Wisconsin
