= Pierre-Joseph-Marie Chaumonot =

French priest and Jesuit missionary

Pierre-Joseph-Marie Chaumonot (French pronunciation: [pjɛʁ ʒozɛf maʁi ʃomɔno]; aka Joseph Marie Chaumonot) (March 9, 1611 – February 21, 1693) was a French priest and Jesuit missionary who learned and documented the language of the Wendat people, also known as the Huron. A series of anonymous manuscript dictionaries of French and Indigenous languages, now preserved at the Musée de la civilisation and the John Carter Brown Library, is traditionally attributed to Chaumonot. He studied at the Jesuits’ noviciate in Florence and, after three more years of training, came to Canada in 1639.

== Life ==
Chaumonot was born 9 March 1611 at Châtillon-sur-Seine in (Côte d’Or, Burgundy). He entered St. Andrew’s Jesuit novitiate in Rome on 18 May 1632 at the age of twenty-one, and was ordained in late 1637 or early 1638. It was at this time that he added "Joseph-Marie" to his name.

He left from the quays of Dieppe on 4 May 1639, and arrived in New France on 31 July. He was immediately involved in the Huron mission being constructed at Sainte-Marie-des-Hurons near Georgian Bay under the leadership of Father Jérôme Lalemant. In the years that followed Chaumonot achieved mastery of the Huron language and recorded it for others to use in the study of the language. From then on, he experienced a long series of moves under difficult circumstances. Father Chaumonot spent nearly ten years in the Huron missions and worked with many notable priests; Jean de Brébeuf, Simon Le Moyne, Claude Dablon, Antoine Daniel and Leonard Garreau to name a few. He remained there until after the death of Brébeuf and his companions and the destruction of the missions. He was deputed to conduct 400 Hurons to Quebec, and he established them on a reservation on the Isle of Orléans opposite the city.

After Le Moyne had arranged a mission among the Onondagas of New York, Chaumonot and Dablon were sent to organize it. This mission lasted only two years; the priests and the fifty colonists who joined them subsequently being obliged to escape in the night to avoid a general massacre. One of Father Chaumonot's lasting achievements was the founding of the Huron mission of Notre-Dame-de-Lorette in 1674.

In 1688, Father Claude Dablon asked Chaumonot to write an autobiography, from which many details of his life are known. Chaumonot retired in 1691 to the Jesuit College in Quebec City, where he died at the age of 82. He had served 52 years in his ministries.
