= Lake Marquette =

Lake in the state of Minnesota, United States

- Location within Minnesota
- Location: Beltrami County, Minnesota
- Coordinates: 47°25′46″N 94°54′24″W
- Type: lake

Lake Marquette is a lake in Beltrami County, Minnesota, in the United States.

Lake Marquette was named for Jacques Marquette, a French missionary and explorer.

== See also ==
- List of lakes in Minnesota
