= Marquette Building =

The term Marquette Building may refer to:

- Marquette Building (Chicago), completed in 1895
- Marquette Building (Detroit), built in 1905
- Marquette Building (St. Louis), completed in 1914
