= Marquette Transportation Company =

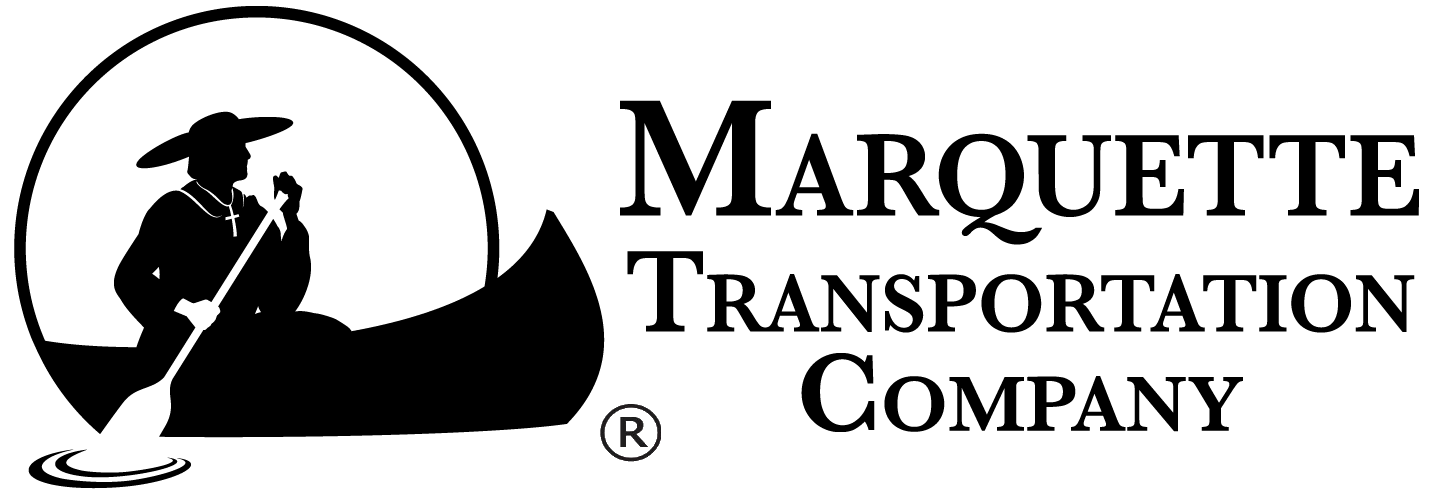
- Company type: Private
- Industry: Transportation
- Founded: 1978
- Founder: Ray Eckstein
- Headquarters: Paducah, Kentucky, United States
- Key people: John Eckstein (CEO)
- Services: Barge transport
- Website: https://www.marquettetrans.com

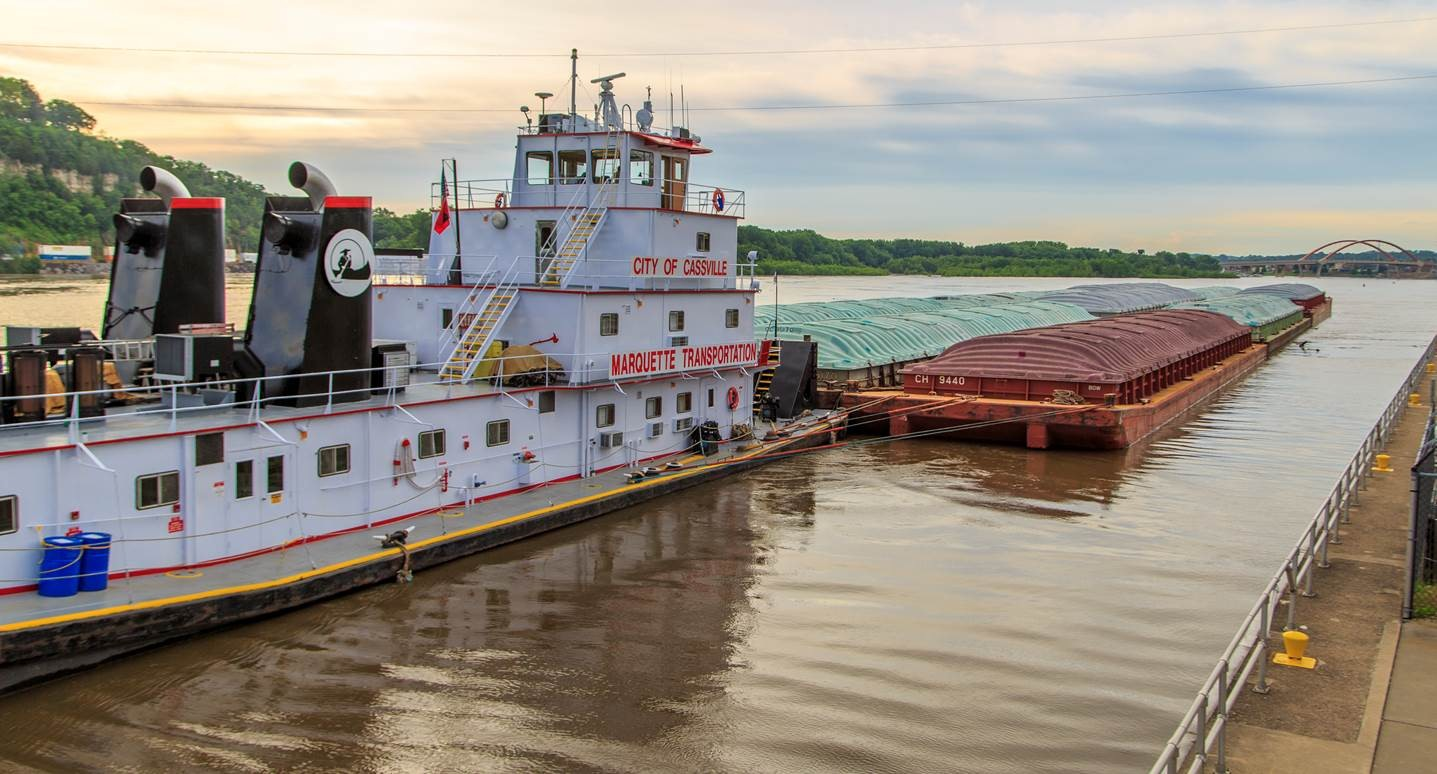
Marquette Transportation Company M/V City of Cassville at Hastings, Minnesota.

The Marquette Transportation Company is a marine transportation company based in Paducah, Kentucky, United States.

According to the company website, Marquette operates over 800 barges with a fleet of more than 50 line-haul vessels, over 60 inland towing vessels, and 9 offshore tugboats. The company operates on the Mississippi River, the Ohio River, the Illinois River, the Tennessee River, the Arkansas River, the Cumberland River, the Tennessee-Tombigbee Waterway, the Intracoastal Waterway (Brownsville, TX to St. Marks, FL), the Eastern Seaboard, the Gulf of Mexico, and the Caribbean.

Marquette operates in three divisions of marine transportation: River, Gulf-Inland, and Offshore Transportation. In addition to transportation services for dry, liquid, and specialty cargo, Marquette provides marine towing, dredge support, and oilfield services.

== History ==
Marquette Transportation Company, named for both Father Jacques Marquette and Marquette University, was founded in 1978 in Cassville, Wisconsin. Since 1991 the company is headquartered in the port city of Paducah, Kentucky. In 1992 John Eckstein took over as CEO. In 1990's Marquette changed from a barge operator to a line-haul towboat company then later started leasing its barges to its towing customers.

Today Marquette's River unit operates more than 50 line-haul vessels and over 800 dry cargo barges.

In 2007 Marquette Transportation added Eckstein Marine Services and HLC Tugs, which became the company's Gulf-Inland and Offshore divisions, respectively. Marquette's Gulf-Inland Division operates more than 60 inland towing vessels across the U.S. inland and Intracoastal Waterway system with an emphasis on the Gulf Intracoastal Waterway from Brownsville, Texas to St. Marks, Florida. Marquette's Offshore Division operates towing in many locations both in and around the U.S., including the Eastern Seaboard, the Gulf of Mexico, the Caribbean, as well as Central America, and Mexico.

In 2015, BDT Capital Partners acquired a majority interest in the company.

== Gallery ==
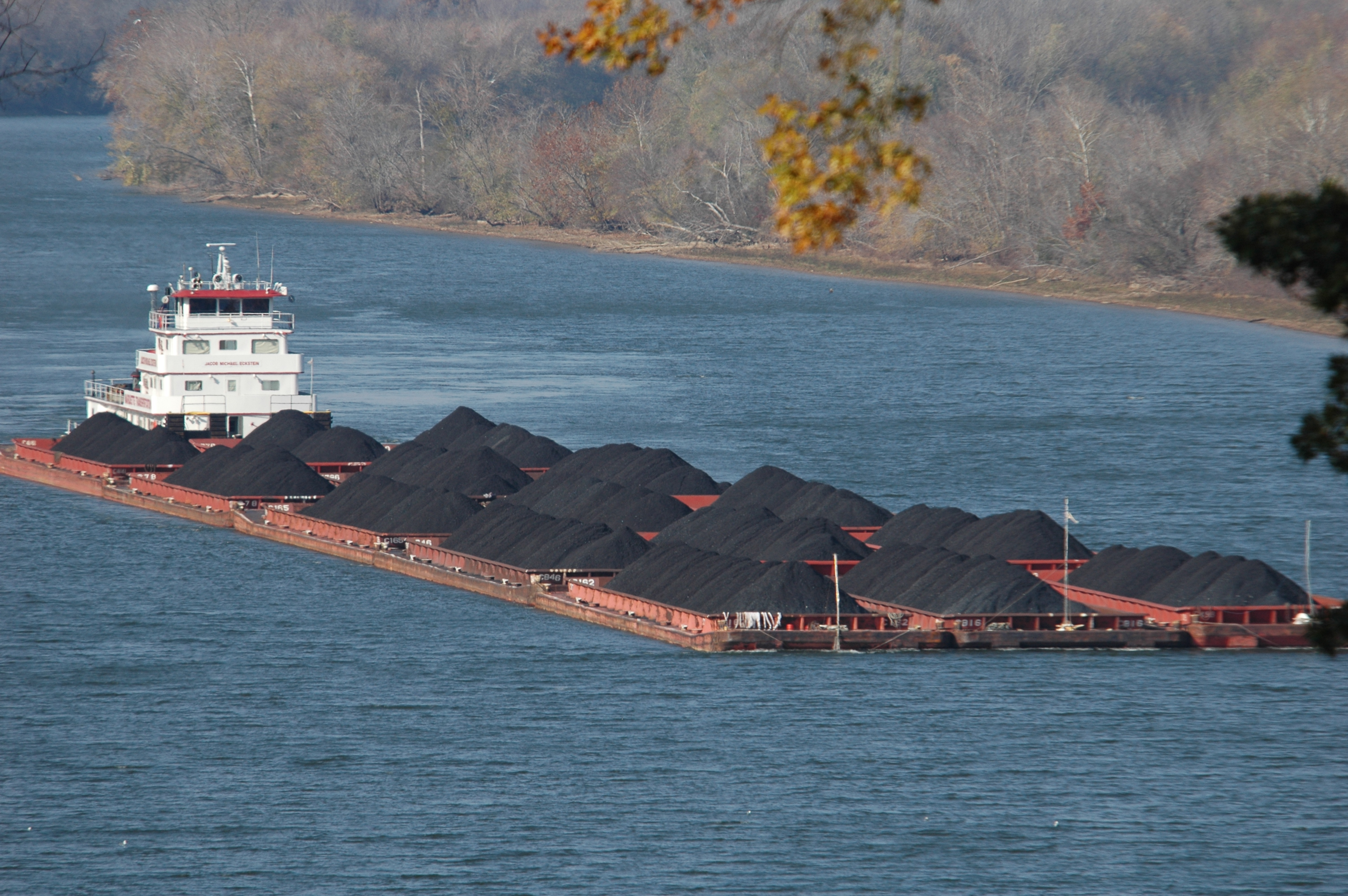
M/V Jacob Michael Eckstein

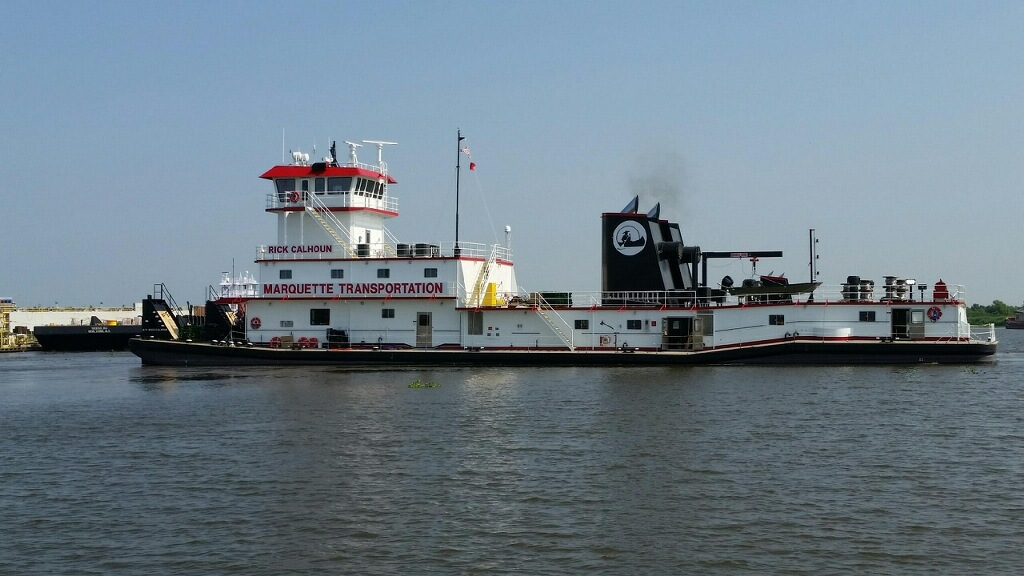
M/V Rick Calhoun

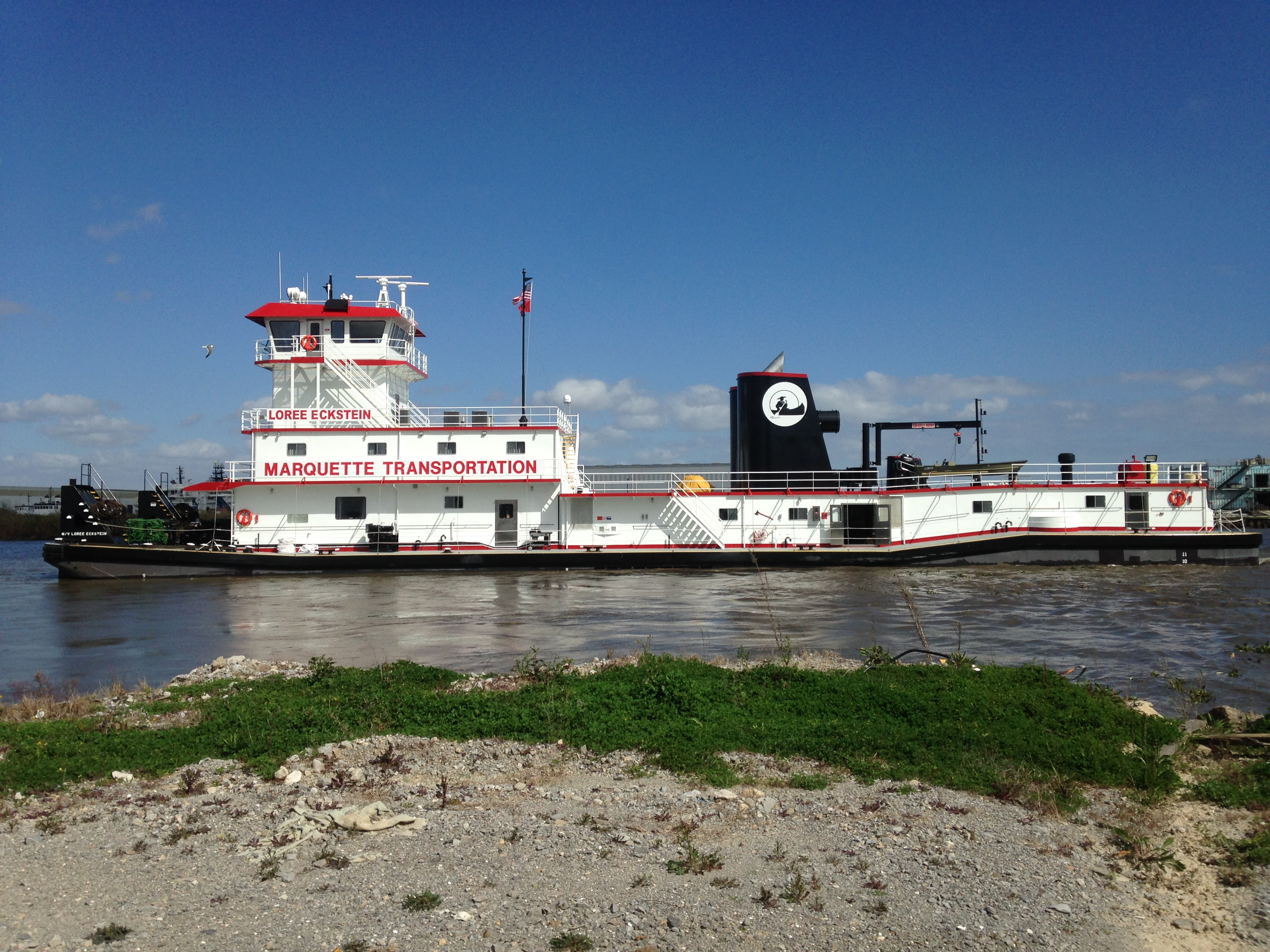
M/V Loree Eckstein

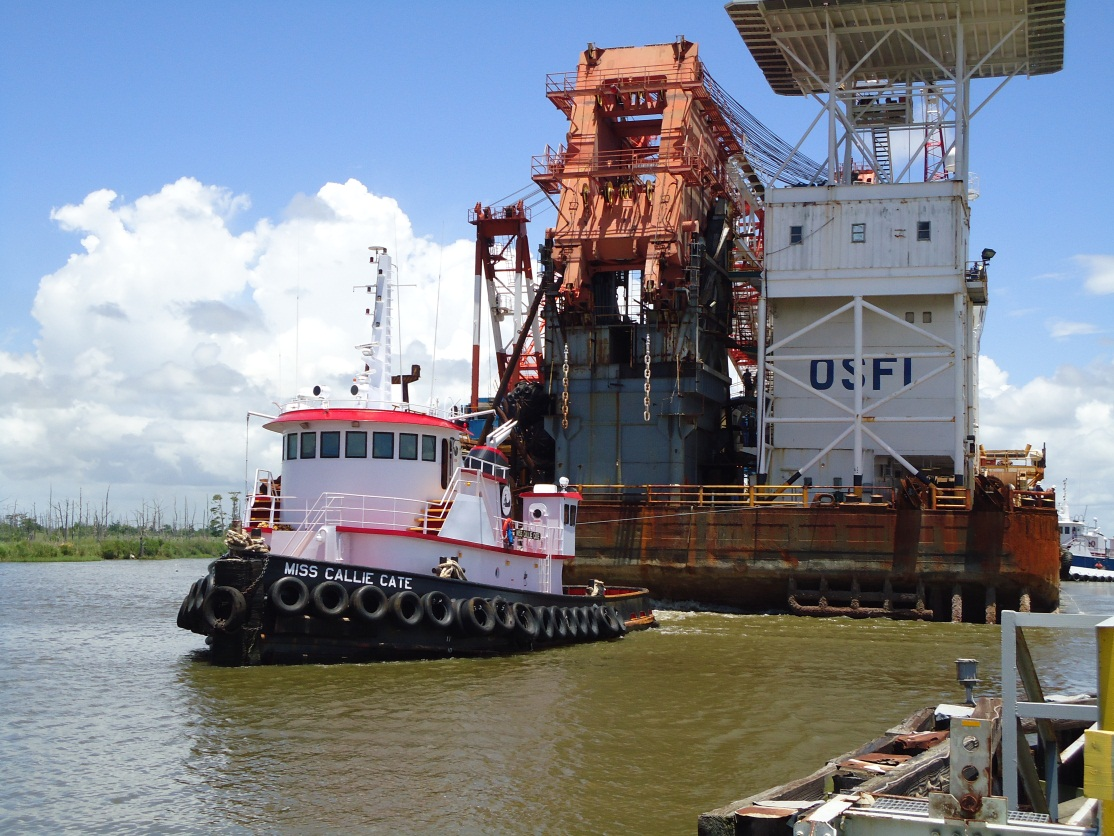
M/V Callie Cate

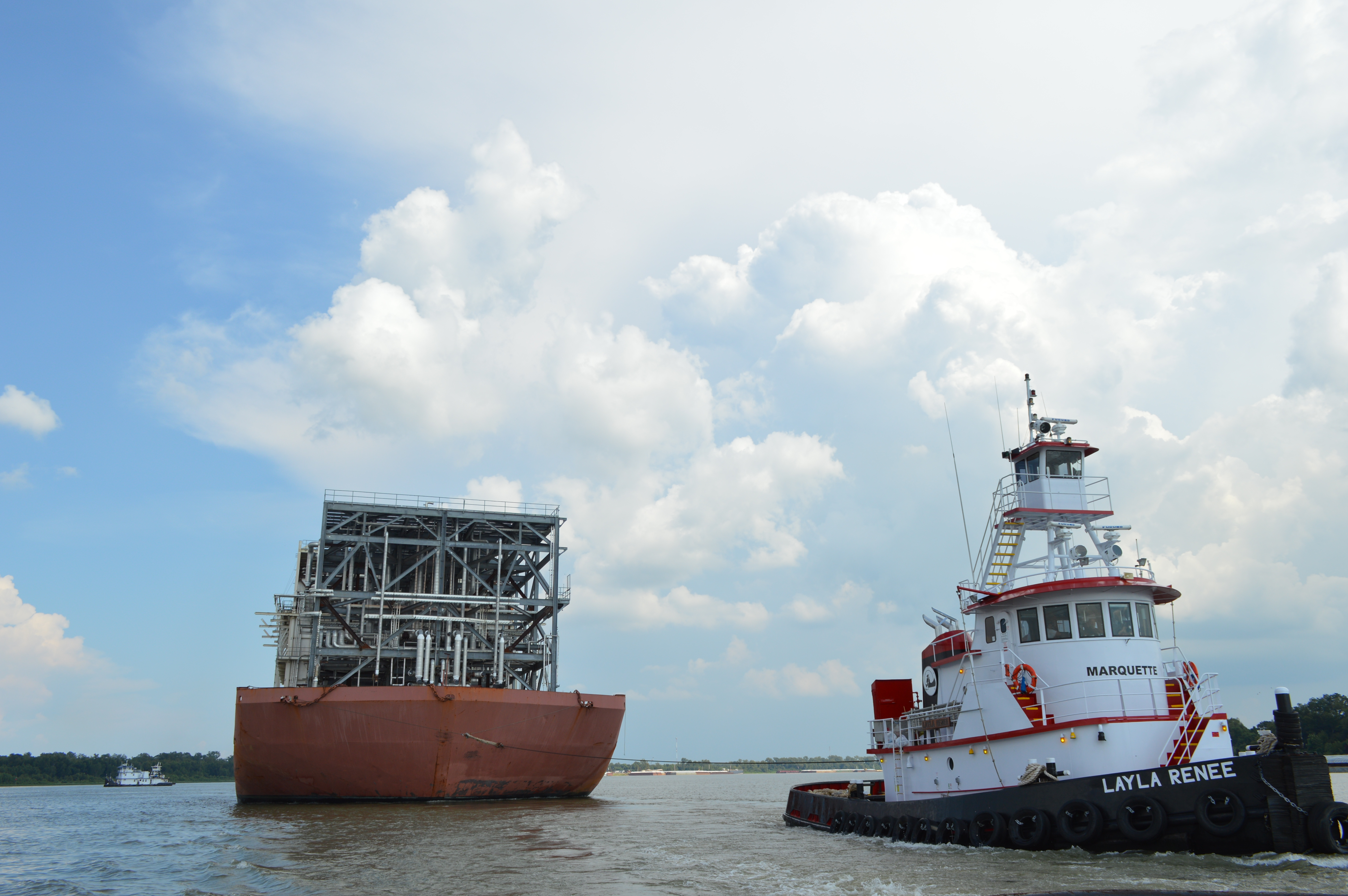
M/V Layla Renee

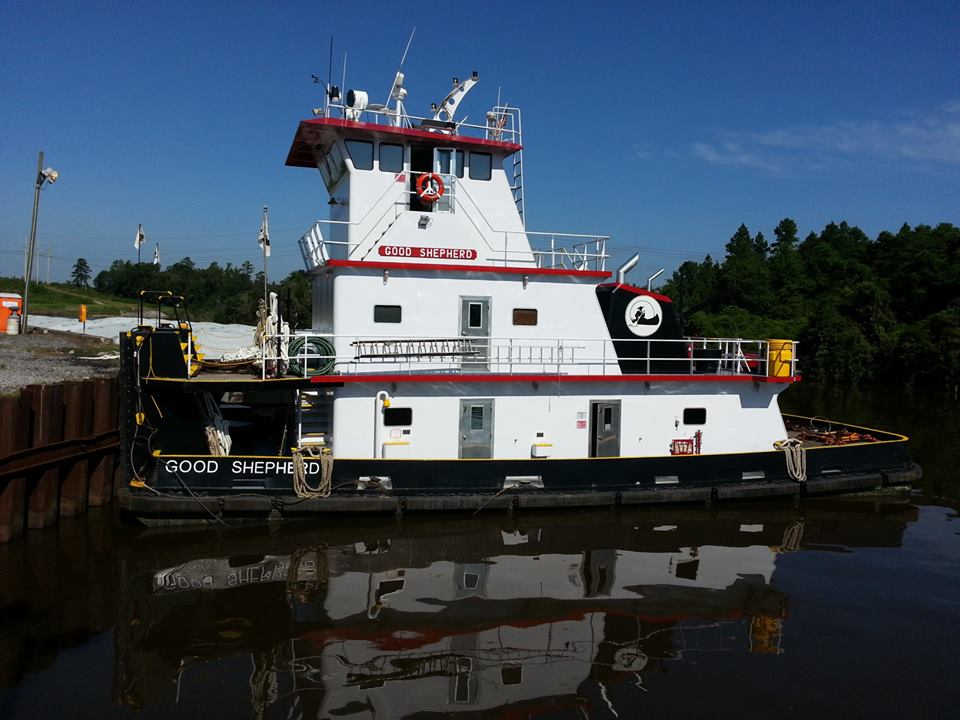
M/V Good Shepherd

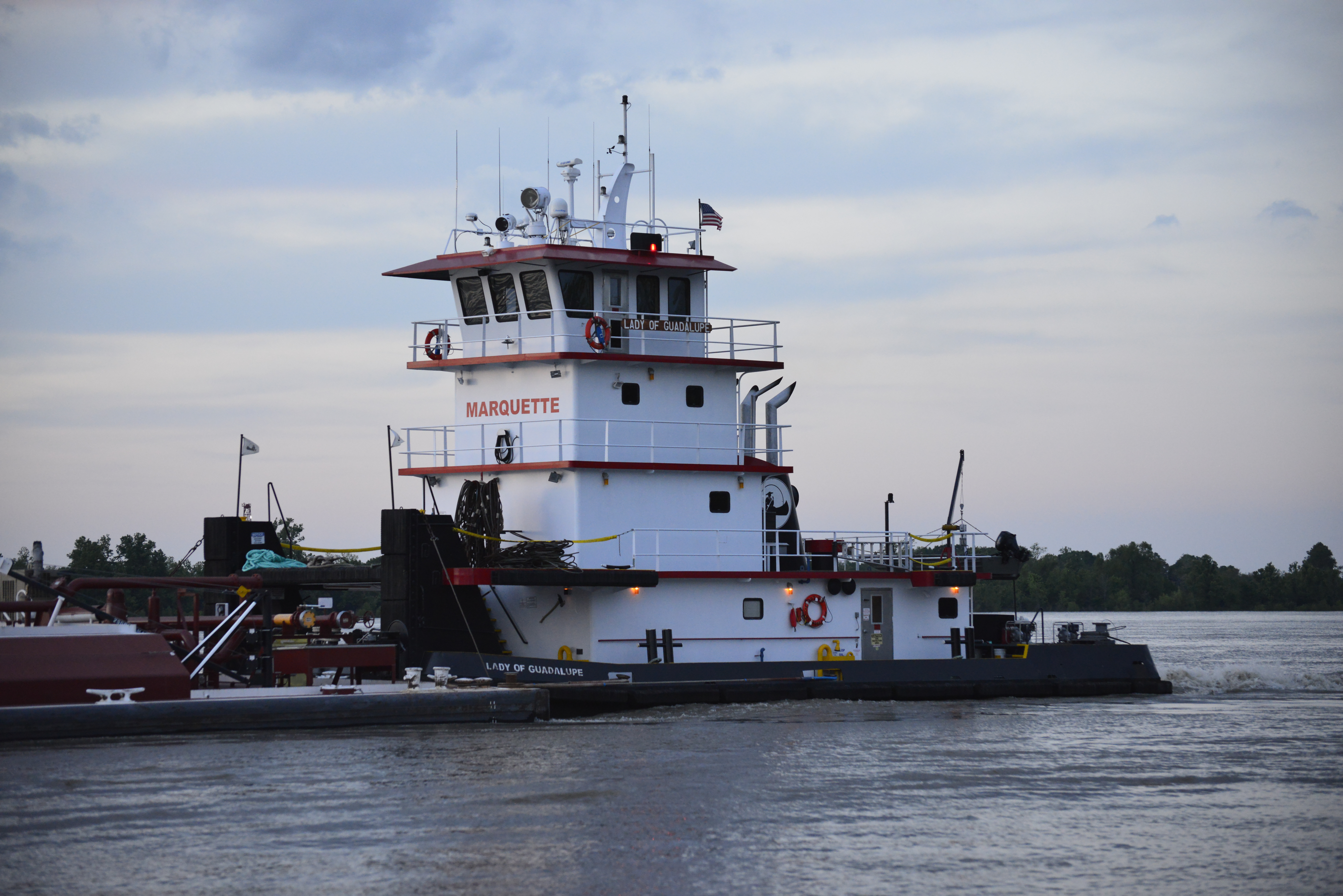
M/V Lady of Guadalupe
