= List of ships named SS Pere Marquette =

The following ships have used the name SS Pere Marquette;

- SS Pere Marquette (1896), the world's first steel train ferry
- SS Pere Marquette 18, a Great Lakes train ferry built in 1902
- SS Pere Marquette (1943), a Liberty ship built in 1943 for World War II, scrapped in 1971
