= Marquette Catholic High School (Illinois) =

High school in Alton, Illinois, US

Location
- 219 East 4th Street; Alton, Illinois 62002; United States; 38°53′30″N 90°10′58″W

Information
- Type: Private
- Motto: Latin: Serviam (I will serve)
- Religious affiliation: Roman Catholic
- Established: 1927; 99 years ago
- Oversight: Independent Board of Directors
- Principal: Tim Harmon
- Teaching staff: 32.4 (FTE)
- Grades: 9–12
- Gender: coed
- Enrollment: 426 (2019–20)
- Student to teacher ratio: 13.1:1
- Colors: Royal blue and white
- Song: On Explorers
- Athletics conference: Gateway Metro
- Mascot: Captain Marquette
- Team name: Explorers
- Accreditation: North Central Association of Colleges and Schools
- Newspaper: Marquette Chronicle
- Yearbook: The Explorer
- Endowment: $2.1 million
- Tuition: $7,800
- Website: marquettecatholic.org

Marquette Catholic High School is a private, Catholic high school in Alton, Illinois. It is located in the Diocese of Springfield in Illinois.

== History ==
Marquette Catholic was established in 1927 by the Ursuline Sisters. It was built at the request of Bishop Griffin, the Bishop of Springfield in Illinois. It was the first coeducational Catholic high school in the Diocese. The Ursuline Sisters have a history of teaching the youth of Alton dating back to 1859. The Ursuline Sisters left in 1992 and the school was then operated by the Diocese. In 2007, an independent board of directors was established and relinquished control of the school.

== Curriculum ==
Marquette Catholic is a College Preparatory school.

=== College prep ===
This program gives students a solid foundation for college studies, and fulfills all the requirements for admittance into the Illinois University System. The majority of students are in this program. Many students in the College Prep program also take some Honors program courses.

=== Honors program ===
The Honors program challenges the student in content, standards, and classroom procedures. Students are placed in the Honors track following a review of their grades and score on the Placement Exam, as well as discussion with the student and their parents/guardians. Students in the Honors Program are expected to have a higher standard of learning ability above and beyond College Prep coursework. Approximately 15-20% of students are in the Honors Program.

=== Advanced Placement ===
Marquette Catholic offers Advanced Placement (AP) courses in Literature, Composition, Calculus, Chemistry, Physics, Economics, and U.S. Government. Marquette students taking AP Courses must take the associated AP Exam. College credit is often awarded to students who pass these national exams at the discretion of the university they attend.

== Extracurricular activities ==
Marquette has a wide variety of different clubs and organizations. There are Explorers for Life (Pro-Life), Students Against Destructive Decisions (SADD), Cultural Awareness Club, Spanish Club, Ambassadors, Breast Cancer Awareness Club (BCA), the Newspaper Staff, Students for Soldiers, Veterans Heritage Project (VHP), Peer Leadership, Yearbook, Diversity Club, Support Other Students (SOS), Scholar Bowl, WYSE, Campus Ministry, and Student Council.

=== Sports ===
Assistant Principal Greg DeCourcey was the varsity baseball coach from 1977 to 2009 and had a 641-351-2 record, finishing eighth all-time on the IHSA baseball coach wins list. Under DeCourcey's helm, the baseball team won 15 regional titles and 7 sectional titles. They beat Mount Carmel in 1980 and Aurora Central Catholic in 1984 to capture the Class A State Championship twice during the 1980s. The 1988 team finished as State Runner-Up, losing to Peru St. Bede. In 2012 DeCourcey was elected into the Illinois High School Baseball Coaches Hall of Fame. Also in 2012, under Coach Joe Silkwood, the team won the Springfield 1A Super-Sectional on a walk-off single by Austin Siener, qualifying them for the state tournament. They lost the semi-final to St. Anthony Catholic High. However, they beat Lena-Winslow in the Third Place game.

The girls' soccer team won the 2011 IHSA Class 1A State Championship with a 19-5-1 record in the 13th season under head coach Robert Moginot. It was the second appearance in the state championship game for the team under Moginot, which finished second in 2010.

In 2011, softball pitcher Alexis Silkwood set the state single-season record for strikeouts. In 2012, she set the state single-season record for no-hitters. In 2010, Alexis lead the team to a fourth-place finish in the state tournament. The team followed up with a third-place finish in 2011.

The football team has made the IHSA 3A playoffs for the past 7 years. The 1982 team was State Runner-Up, the only time the football team has made it to the Finals. In 2012, the boys' soccer team clinched their first trip to the state tournament in team history. They would go on to win their first state championship. The boys soccer team would again win state in 2017.

== Notable alumni ==
- Craig Hentrich – former professional football player who played 17 seasons in the NFL.
- Mike Ford – professional football player for the Cleveland Browns of the NFL. Played college football at SEMO.
- Tanee Sangrat – Thai diplomat and current Thai Ambassador to the United States.
