= Pere Marquette Beach =

Park in Marquette, Michigan, USA

Pere Marquette Park Beach
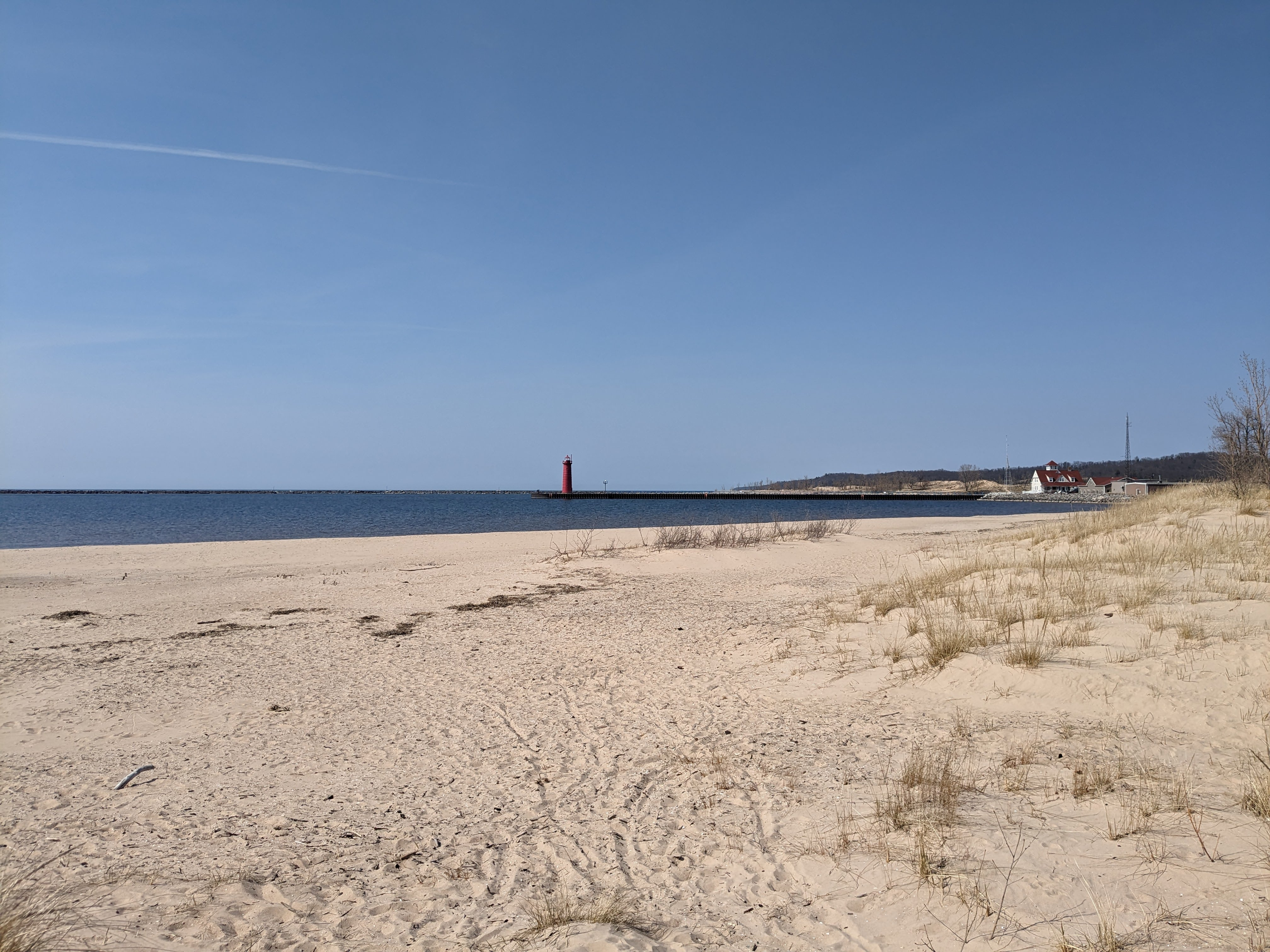
- Muskegon Break Water Light on Lake Michigan, looking from Pere Marquette Beach
- Interactive map of Pere Marquette Park Beach
- Type: City Park
- Location: Muskegon, Michigan
- Coordinates: 43°13′20″N 86°20′05″W
- Area: 27.5 acres (11.1 ha)

Pere Marquette Beach in Muskegon, Michigan is a 27.5-acre (11.1 ha) park comprising 2.5 miles (4.0 km) of public beach on Lake Michigan. In 2004 the beach appeared on lists of certified clean beaches published by the National Healthy Beaches Campaign and the Clean Beaches Council. This city park, located on Lake Michigan, offers a wide expanse of beach, playground, volleyball courts, a restaurant, access to lighthouses and the Muskegon Channel, also the site of the "USS Silversides," a World War II Submarine, and nearby, a full-service restaurant and bar. The beach is also home to the Muskegon Lakeshore Trail, a trail connecting Pere Marquette Beach with Downtown Muskegon, as well as connecting with other northerly trails. The beach is also known for having a very large sand area. Muskegon also has two other beach parks, Harbour Towne Beach and Kruse Park. Kruse Park is the only beach in Muskegon County to allow dogs.
