= Marquette Lake =

Lake in Lac-Ashuapmushuan, Quebec, Canada

- Location within Quebec
- Location: Le Domaine-du-Roy (RCM)
- Coordinates: 48°54′15″N 73°53′35″W
- Type: Natural
- Primary inflows: (clockwise); outlet of lakes Irène, Hemé, Bellabre, Mard, Jalbert, Larioche and Isenay; outlet of lake des Chataires; outlet of lakes Grimpereau, Grans, La Tombelle, Beaurrieux, Petit lac Fouquet, lac Fouquet and lac Loze; outlet of lakess Matié, Calmar, Bosset and Sol.
- Primary outflows: Marquette River
- Basin countries: Canada
- Max. length: 14.0 kilometres (8.7 mi)
- Max. width: 1.7 kilometres (1.1 mi)
- Surface elevation: 411 metres (1,348 ft)

Marquette Lake (French: Lac Marquette, pronounced [lak maʁkɛt]) is a freshwater body of the unorganized territory of Lac-Ashuapmushuan, Quebec in the Regional County Municipality (RCM) Le Domaine-du-Roy, north-west of Saguenay-Lac-Saint-Jean administrative region, in province of Quebec, in Canada.

This lake is included in the Châteaufort and Marquette townships. Marquette Lake follows the western boundary (distance between 1.5 kilometres (0.93 mi) and 3.5 kilometres (2.2 mi)) outside (west side) of the boundary of the Ashuapmushuan Wildlife Reserve.

Forestry is the main economic activity of the sector. Recreational tourism activities come second.

The Forest Road R0212 (East-West) passes the north side of Marquette Lake. It will join to the East, the route 167 connecting Chibougamau and Saint-Félicien, Quebec, as well as the railway of the Canadian National Railway. Other secondary forest roads serve the vicinity of the lake.

The surface of Lac Marquette is usually frozen from early November to mid-May, however, safe ice circulation is generally from mid-November to mid-April.

== Geography ==
This lake has a length of 14.0 kilometres (8.7 mi) oriented to the northwest, a maximum width of 1.7 kilometres (1.1 mi) and an altitude of 411 metres (1,348 ft). This lake expands to 1.2 kilometres (0.75 mi) thanks to a bay facing east. This bay is the center of a semicircle of about 5.5 kilometres (3.4 mi) of radius on the east side of the lake, with a less rugged terrain whose highest hill reaches an altitude of 492 metres (1,614 ft). On the outskirts of this area, a series of mountains has several peaks, the highest reaching 699 metres (2,293 ft), or 7.3 kilometres (4.5 mi) of the lake. On the west side of the lake, the highest mountain peak is 625 metres (2,051 ft), which is 2.6 kilometres (1.6 mi) from the west shore of the lake.

The mouth of Lake Marquette is located at:

- 47.3 kilometres (29.4 mi) north-east of Gouin Reservoir;
- 28.0 kilometres (17.4 mi) south of the mouth of the Marquette River (confluence with the Ashuapmushuan River);
- 121 kilometres (75 mi) west of the mouth of the Ashuapmushuan River (confluence with lac Saint-Jean);
- 163 kilometres (101 mi) east of the mouth of lac Saint-Jean (confluence with the Saguenay River);
- 323 kilometres (201 mi) east of the mouth of the Saguenay River (confluence with the Estuary of Saint Lawrence).

The main hydrographic slopes near Lac Marquette are:

- North side: Marquette River, Normandin River;
- East side: La Tombelle Lake, Grand Portage River, Licorne River;
- South side: Loup River West, Berlinguet Creek;
- West side: Normandin River, Little Buade Lake, Buade Lake (Normandin River).
From the mouth of Marquette Lake, the current of the Marquette River flows over 64.9 kilometres (40.3 mi) generally to the north, to its mouth northwest of the Ashuapmushuan Lake. Then the current flows along the Ashuapmushuan River which flows over 193 kilometres (120 mi) to the northeast, then to the south-east to its confluence with the lac Saint-Jean where it empties on the West Bank at Saint-Félicien, Quebec.

== Toponymy ==
The toponym "Lac Marquette" was formalized on October 5, 1982, by the Commission de toponymie du Québec, when it was created.

== See also ==
- Saguenay River
- Lac Saint-Jean, a body of water
- Ashuapmushuan River, a watercourse
- Marquette River, a watercourse
- Le Domaine-du-Roy, a regional county municipality (MRC)
- Lac-Ashuapmushuan, Quebec, an unorganized territory
- List of lakes of Canada
