= Clifty Falls State Park =

State park in Indiana, United States

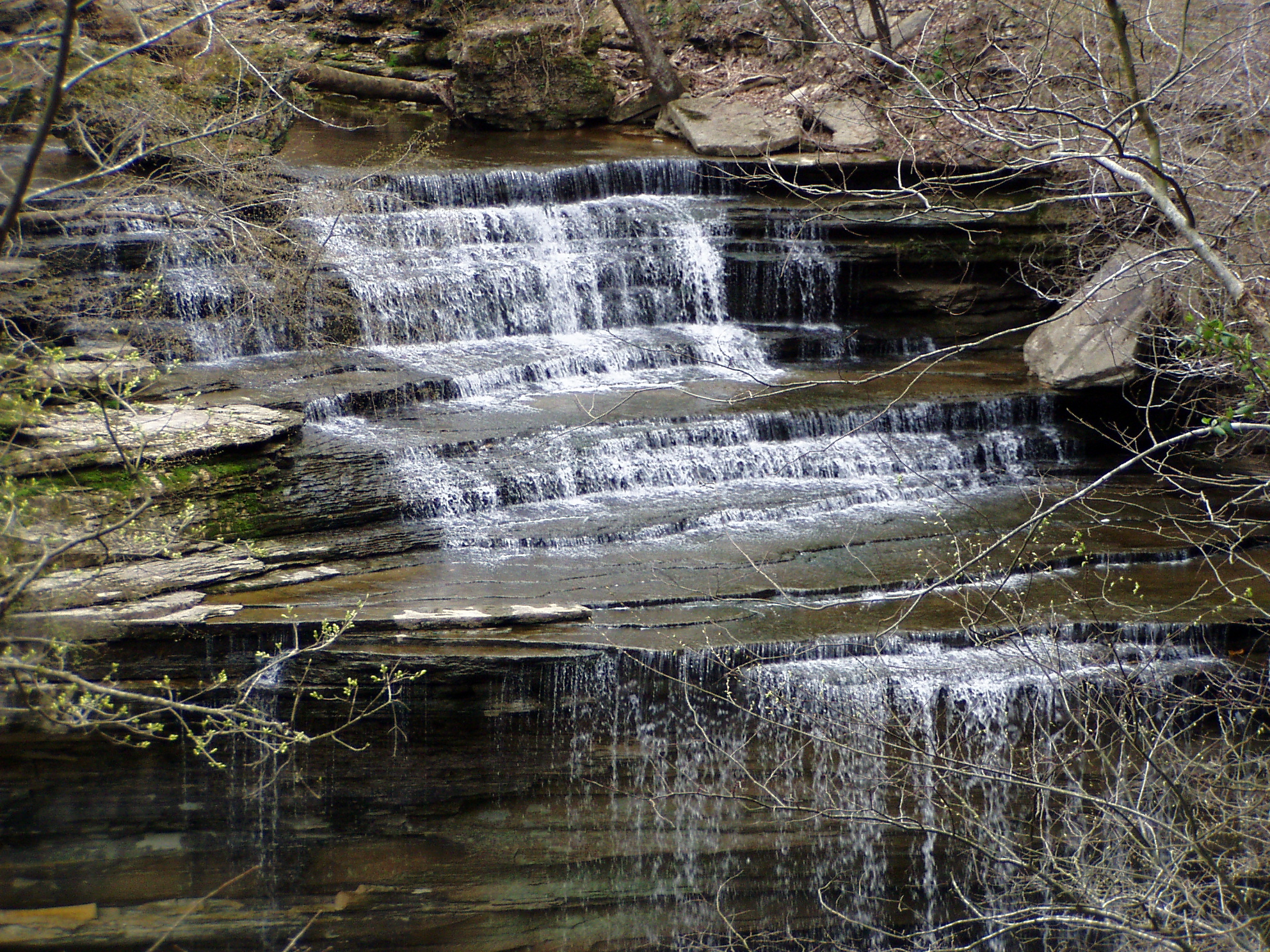
- Clifty Falls from the Overlook

- Location within Indiana
- Interactive map of Clifty Falls State Park
- Location: Jefferson County, Indiana, USA
- Nearest city: Madison, Indiana
- Coordinates: 38°44′53″N 85°24′55″W
- Area: 1,416 acres (573 ha)
- Created: 1920
- Operator: Indiana Department of Natural Resources
- Visitors: 372,925 (in 2018–2019)

Clifty Falls State Park is an Indiana state park on 1,416 acres (573 ha) in Jefferson County, Indiana in the United States. It is 46 miles (74 km) northeast of Louisville, Kentucky. The park attracts about 370,000 visitors annually.

On October 27, 1920, citizens of Madison, Indiana gave the land for the park, 570 acres (230 ha), to the state of Indiana at the suggestion of Richard Lieber. This was after a year's work by the citizens. A naturalist program for Indiana state parks started in 1927, with Clifty Falls being one of the first four parks to implement the program.

The park features Clifty Creek, Little Clifty Creek, and a canyon in which the sun only shines during midday.

It has many acclaimed nature trails, especially those that go near Clifty Falls. The Clifty Inn is available for overnight guests, and the park contains a campground with sites for RV and tent campers.

== Canyons ==
Clifty Creek Canyon traverses the entire north–south length of the state park. The upper rim of the canyon at the north end of the park is 800 feet (240 m) above sea level, descending to the valley of the Ohio River which is 500 feet (150 m) above sea level. The creek descends down to about 750 feet (230 m) before dropping over one of the two Clifty Falls. Then it runs downward until reaching the Ohio River. Two other major canyons enter Clifty Creek Canyon from the east, they are Deans Branch (Tunnel Falls) and Hoffman Branch (Hoffman Falls).

== Waterfalls ==
Clifty Falls State Park is named for the waterfalls on Clifty Creek.

- Big Clifty Falls - 60 feet (18 m)
- Little Clifty Falls - 60 feet (18 m)
- Hoffman Falls - 78 feet (24 m)
- Tunnel Falls - 83 feet (25 m)

== Trails ==
Clifty Falls State Park has ten trails that vary from easy, moderate, rugged and very rugged. Trail two is the only very rugged trail and it is the most rugged trail in all of Indiana. Because of the danger of falling rocks, the end of the trail is blocked from the public. There are old steps, also blocked, that used to lead down to the falls. You can see the falls from an overlook carved out of the side of the canyon.

== Gallery ==
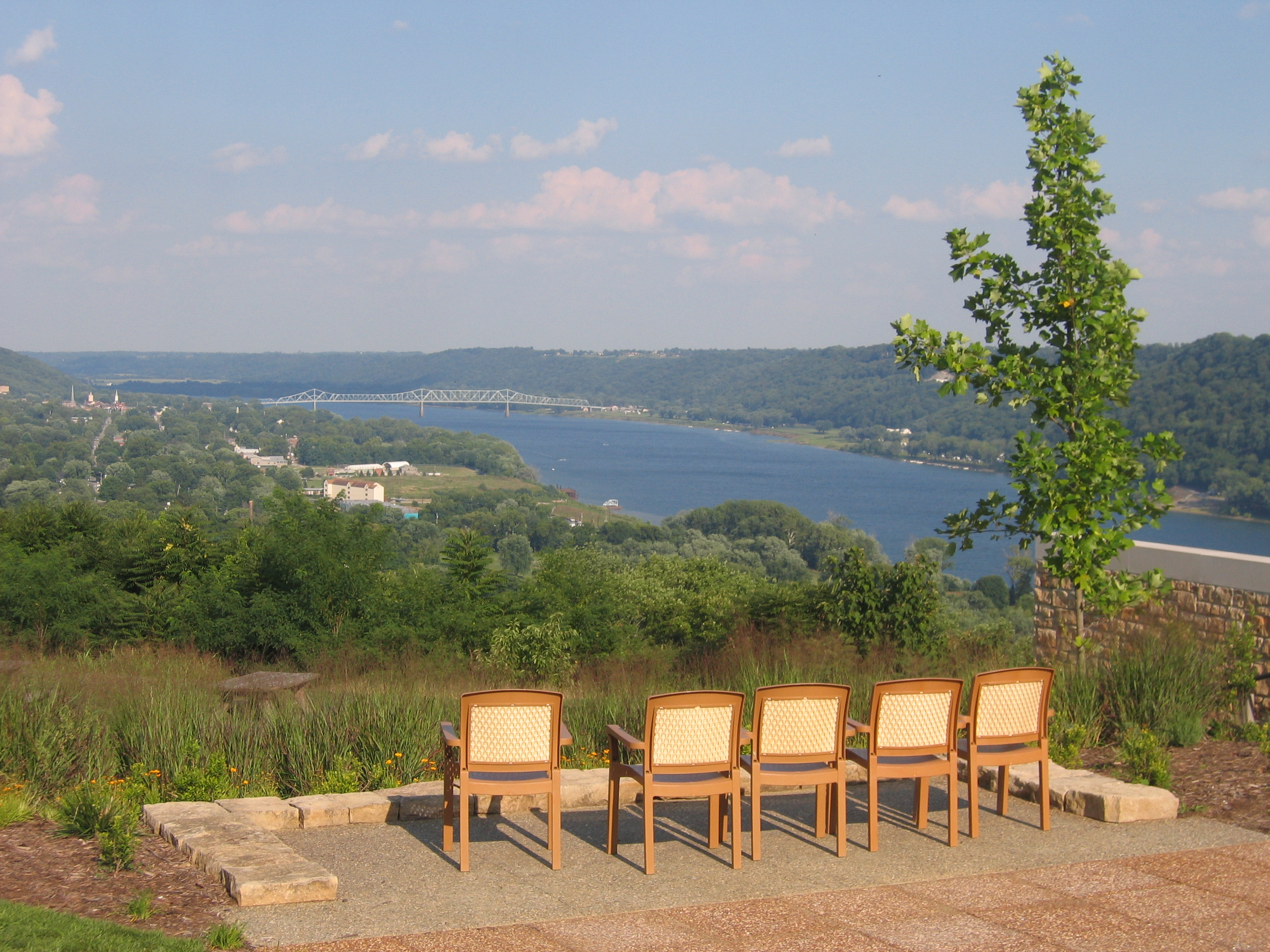
View of the Ohio River from Clifty Inn in the southern part of the park

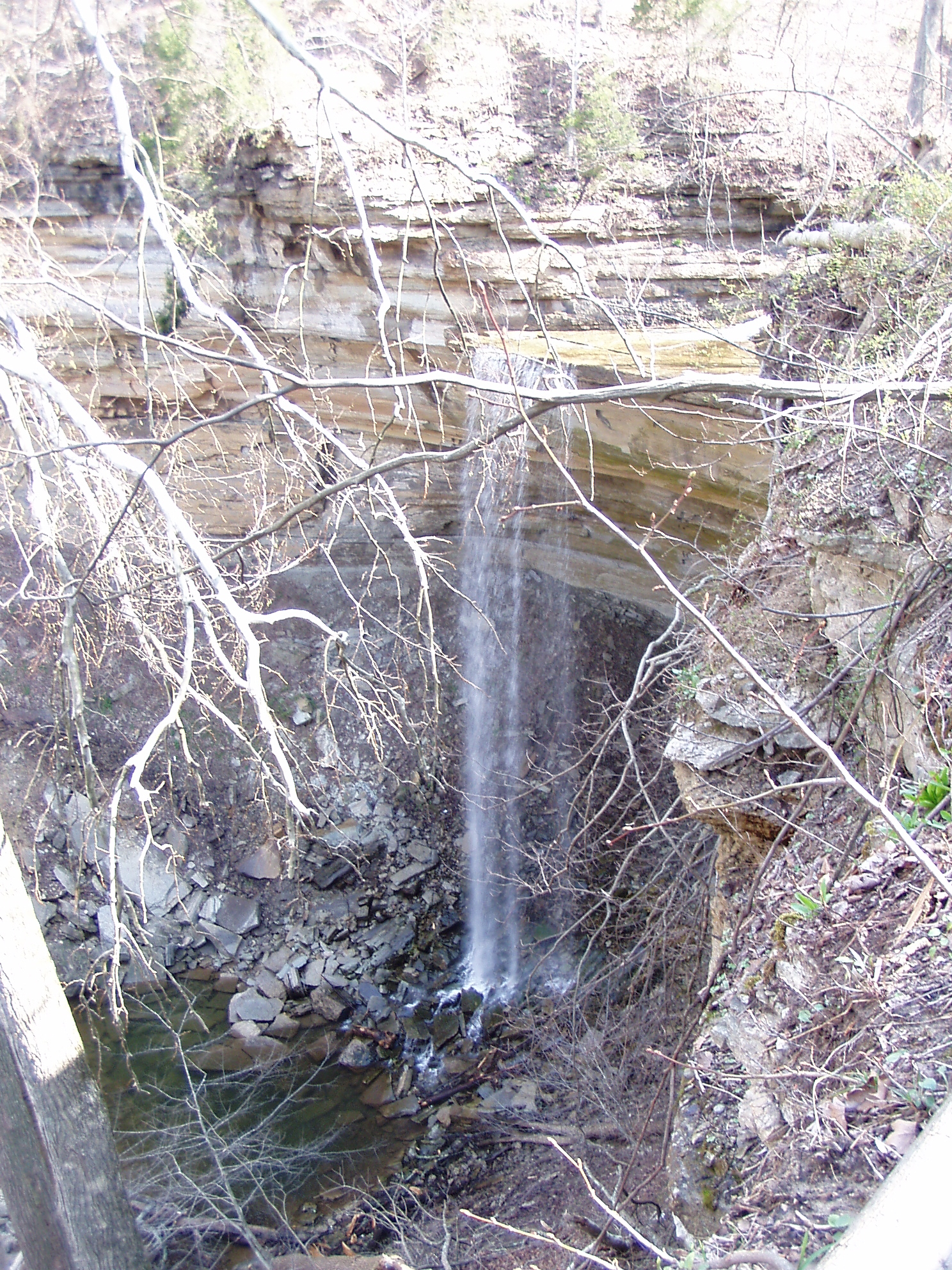
Tunnel Falls from the Tunnel Falls Trail

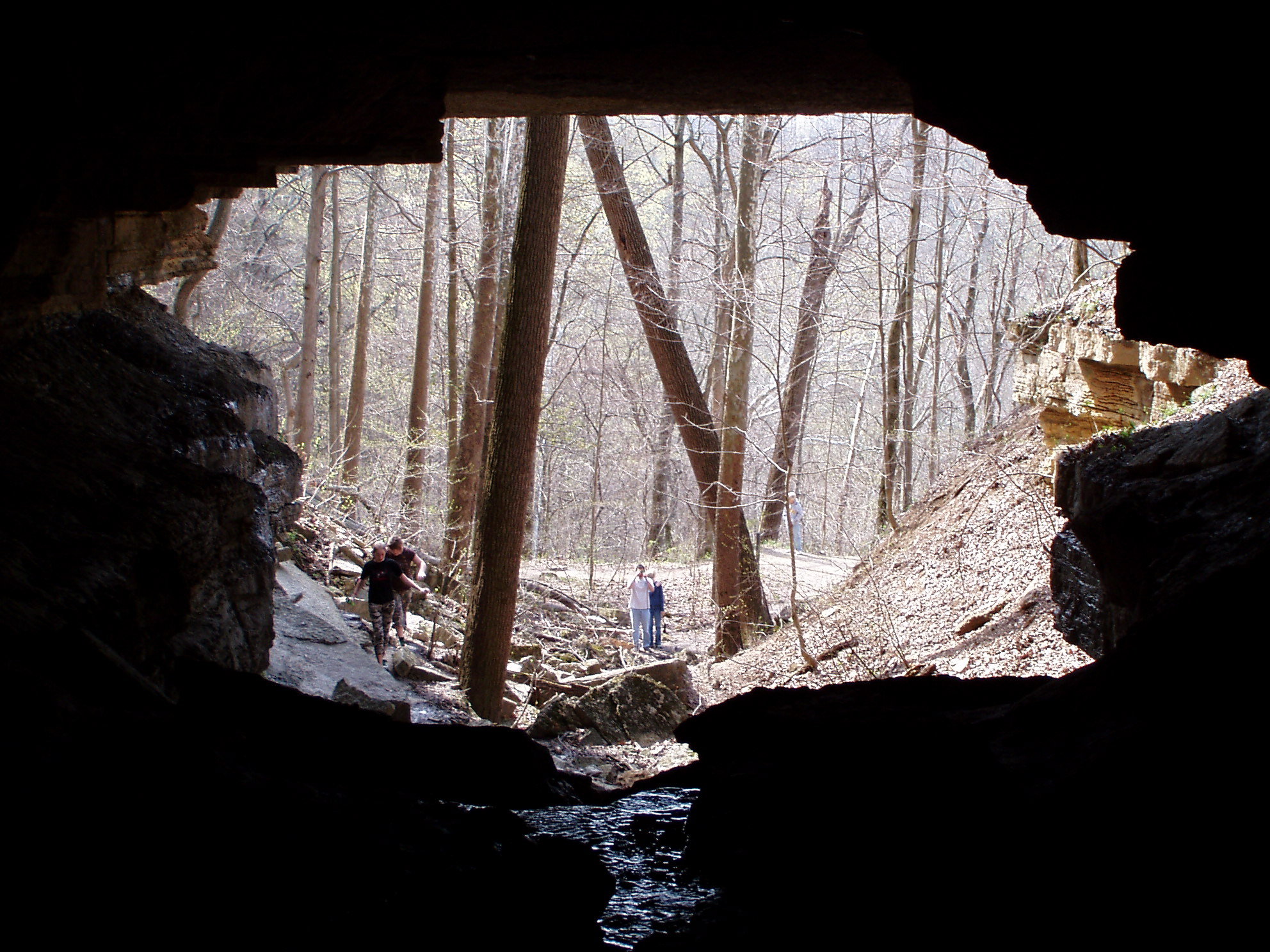
The Tunnel is an abandoned Railroad Tunnel that was never completed. It is closed to the public from Nov 1 – April 30 to protect hibernating bats from the White-Nosed Bat Syndrome.

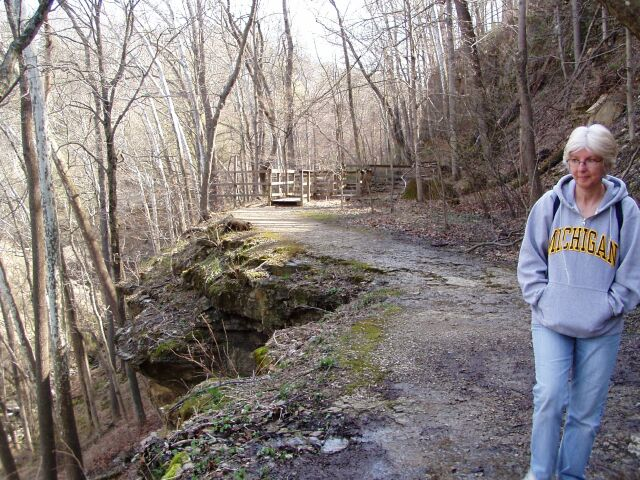
The Tunnel Trail like most of the trails are along the sides of the valley.

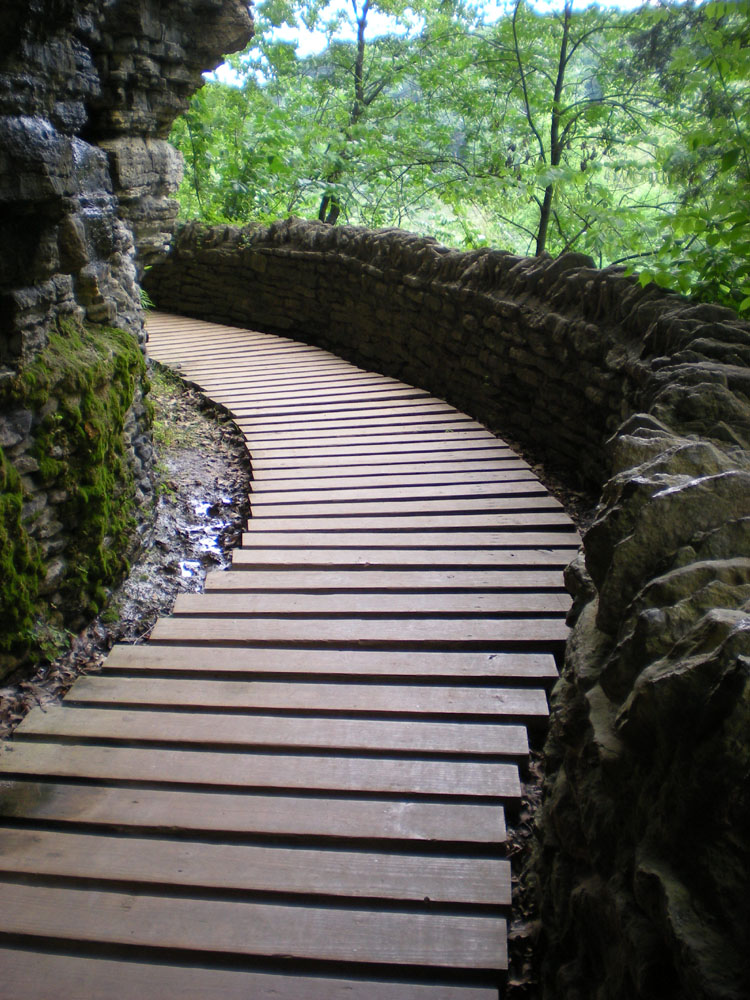

== See also ==
- List of Indiana state parks
- List of waterfalls
