= Prophetstown State Park =

State park in Tippecanoe County, Indiana, US

Prophetstown
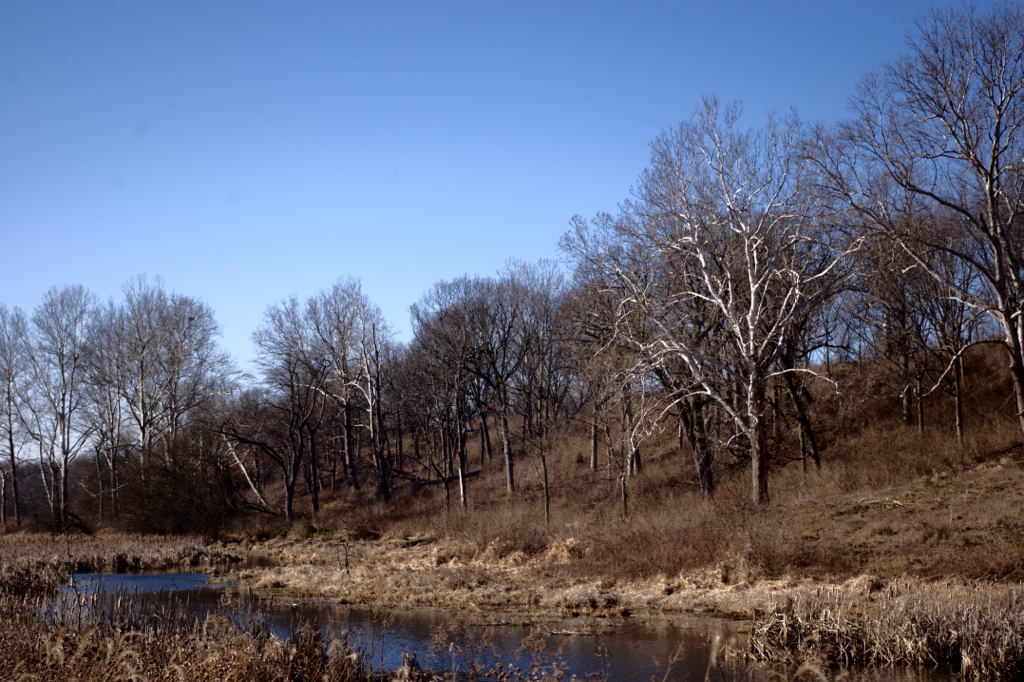
- Prophetstown State Park, January 2012

- Location within Indiana Location within the United States
- Type: State Park
- Location: Tippecanoe County, Indiana, United States
- Nearest city: Battle Ground, Indiana
- Coordinates: 40°30′0″N 86°50′0″W
- Area: 2,000 acres (810 ha)
- Created: 2004
- Operator: Indiana Department of Natural Resources
- Visitors: 334,375 (in 2018–2019)
- Website: Official Website

Prophetstown State Park commemorates the Native American village of the same name founded in 1808 by Shawnee leaders Tecumseh and his brother Tenskwatawa north of present-day Lafayette, Indiana, which grew into a large, multi-tribal community. The park features an open-air museum at Prophetstown, with living history exhibits including a Shawnee village and a 1920s-era farmstead. Battle Ground, Indiana, is a village about a mile east of the site of the Battle of Tippecanoe in 1811, a crucial battle in Tecumseh's War which ultimately led to the demise of Prophetstown. The state park was established in 2004 and receives about 335,000 visitors annually.

Restored tallgrass prairie at Prophetstown State Park, near the site of Tecumseh and Tenskwatawa's confederacy village, photographed in 2026.

== History ==
The park was first proposed in 1989 but did not receive funding from the Indiana legislature until 1994. Land acquisition continued through 1999 when the legislature funded $3.7 million to create the park. Indiana Governor Joe Kernan formally dedicated the park in 2004. The campground opened the following year and was a partnership with Lafayette as part of the Lafayette Inn tax proceeds. Construction of the aquatic park began in October 2012 and was completed in 2013 after lobbying by local officials to drive more visitors to the park and Tippecanoe County.

The Farm at Prophetstown is a non-profit organization that rents approximately 125 acres (51 ha) from the Indiana Department of Natural Resources to show farming life as it was in the 1920s.

== Facilities and activities ==
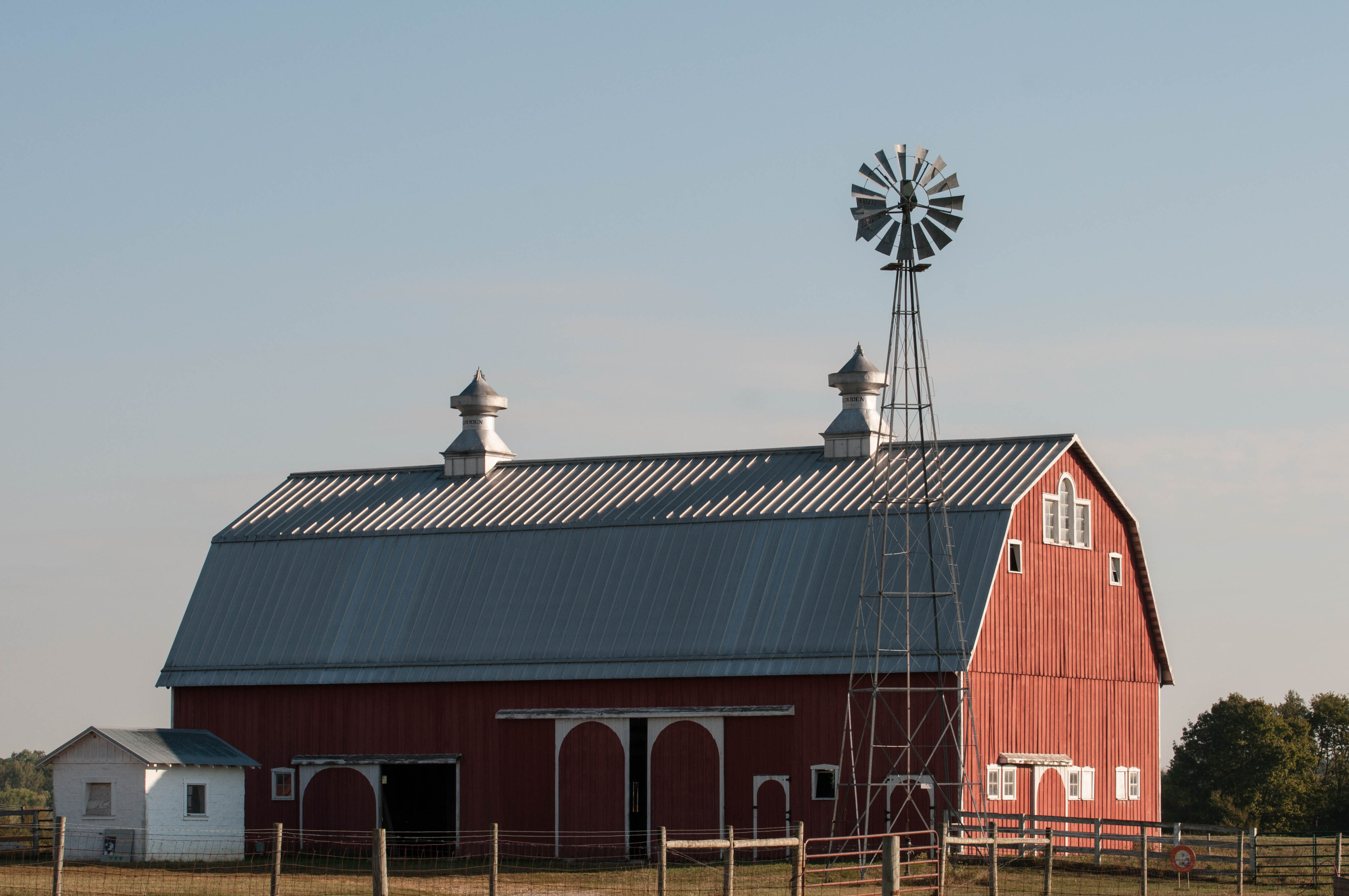
Prophetstown barn

- Historic Prophetstown farmstead, a 1920s living history farm.
- Woodland Indian settlement with replicas of a Shawnee council house and medicine lodge
- Hiking trail (2.75 miles (4.43 km))
- Bicycle trail (2.4 miles (3.9 km))
- Interpretative naturalist services
- Picnic areas and shelters
- Camping, with 110 campsites and a dumping station
