= Irene Herlocker-Meyer =

American chemist and environmental activist

Irene Herlocker-Meyer (née Speros; April 19, 1921 – September 21, 2014) was an American chemist and environmental activist, notable for her successful ten-year effort to save the Hoosier Prairie in Lake County, Indiana. This pocket of 335 acres, a piece of true prairie, in the heart of an industrial region, is a remnant of natural meadowland that has never been farmed or forested. It contains many unique plants and animals. It is now a National Natural Landmark and represents an example of successful community action on behalf of the environment.

== Early life and education ==
Herlocker-Meyer, born Irene Mary Speros in Gary, Indiana, on April 19, 1921, was the daughter of Vaselia and George, a clothing merchant, both Greek immigrants. She grew up with her younger brother in Indiana Harbor in East Chicago, Indiana. As a girl scout, she went on camping trips. She attended Washington High School in East Chicago, Indiana. In 1935, she represented her school at the Purdue-Indiana high school debaters’ conference and became a features editor for her school's weekly paper. Speros graduated from Washington High School in 1938, receiving a scholarship from a national Hellenic organization, as well as the George H. Lewis gold medal from her high school. In 1942, she graduated from the University of Chicago with a bachelor's degree in chemistry.

== Work life and activism ==
After graduating, Speros worked for Western Electric doing library research work. She became one of the first women to work in the laboratories of the Lever Plant in Hammond, Indiana. While working for Sinclair refineries, Speros met chemical engineer Robert Dean Herlocker. They married on September 10, 1949, Speros taking the name of Herlocker, and lived in Hammond throughout the 1950s. They adopted a daughter, Despina. Herlocker became active in the American Association of University Women (AAUW) and in the local chapter of the League of Women Voters. After moving to Munster, Indiana in March 1963, Herlocker noted the lack of chickadees and wrote to the local newspaper about it. In 1967, a neighbour invited her to a birdwatching spot in Lake County. It was a 300-acre habitat, surrounded by railroad tracks and industrial sites but with abundant wildflowers and birds, in short, a tiny remnant of Indiana or Hoosier prairie-land. Soon the area was reduced by 73 acres with the construction of a crude oil, tank storage farm. Under further threat, it was in danger of disappearing altogether. So, from 1967 to 1976 Herlocker led one of Indiana's most politically difficult conservation battles and saved what is now the Hoosier Prairie State Nature Preserve.

Herlocker talked to her congressman who suggested she contact the Izaak Walton League and the Save the Dunes Council. The Izaak Walton League wanted surveys to be conducted to prove the prairie's value. Herlocker thus contacted Dr. Robert Betz of Northeastern Illinois University who was a keen prairie enthusiast and he completed the first plant inventory. Herlocker also gained the support of the Nature Conservancy. She then formed the Hoosier Prairie Committee and worked to build a bi-partisan network of support. The family that owned Hoosier Prairie decided, against donating the property but did not sell it for building or industrial development. This meant that the land was no longer under the threat of a bidding war for the acreage. The Hoosier Prairie Committee could now go public, using opportunities to speak, and the public media, to inform people about the prairie's rarity and fragility.

After years of work and several setbacks, on September 29, 1976, the first Indiana Dunes National Lakeshore expansion bill was passed and included Hoosier Prairie. On January 14, 1977, the State of Indiana purchased Hoosier Prairie for permanent protection for just over $1 million. Thus, some nine years after Herlocker's first visit to the prairie, the area was finally saved and afforded a double layer of protection as both an Indiana State Nature Preserve and as part of Indiana Dunes National Lakeshore.

Herlocker is considered a leading Indiana preservationist.

== Awards and accolades ==
The Nature Conservancy, Shirley Heinze Land Trust, and the Save the Dunes Council honoured Herlocker by naming her a life member of their boards. In September 2010, Irene Herlocker-Meyer, then in her ninetieth year and having added the family name of her second husband to that of her first, received the award inducting her into Indiana's Conservation Hall of Fame. In 2012, she was given the Paul H. Douglas Memorial Award by Save the Dunes for outstanding service to the cause of preserving and protecting the Indiana dunes.

== Personal life and legacy ==
Herlocker's first husband, who wholeheartedly supported her activism, died in 1977 at the age of 66. In 1988, Herlocker married Hansi (John) Meyer of Beverly Shores. The house they lived in, designed by the architect Harold Olin and now known as the Dr. John and Gerda Meyer House, stands on the lake shore as a historic resource within the Indiana Dunes National Park. Irene Speros Herlocker-Meyer was dubbed “Queen of the Prairie” in 1986 by Indiana Department of Natural Resources Outdoor Indiana magazine in honour of her conservation efforts and successes. She died on September 21, 2014.

The original 300 plus acre core of Hoosier Prairie has now been added to and constitutes over 1,500 acres. It is currently a mixture of black oak savanna, dry, wet, and mesic sand prairie, sedge meadow and some marsh habitats. Over 120 bird species have been observed there, as have over 350 plant species, some 43 of which are rare in Indiana.

Herlocker-Meyer was featured on a women's history postcard printed by the Helaine Victoria Press set up by Nancy Poore and Jocelyn H Cohen.
