= Hoosier Prairie State Nature Preserve =

Protected area in Indiana, US

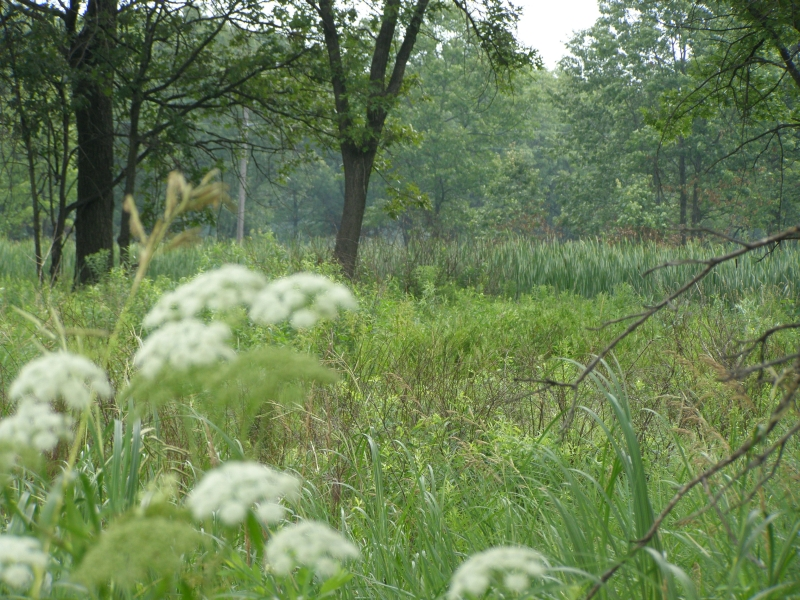
- View of wetland prairie
- Interactive map of Hoosier Prairie State Nature Preserve
- Location: Lake County, Indiana, US
- Nearest city: Griffith, Indiana
- Coordinates: 41°31′21.66″N 87°27′27.26″W
- Established: 1976
- Governing body: Indiana Dept of Natural Resources; National Park Service

U.S. National Natural Landmark
- Designated: 1974

Hoosier Prairie is a unit of Indiana Dunes National Park in Lake County, Indiana. It began in the 1970s as wasteland that the Hoosier Prairie Committee founded by Irene Herlocker-Meyer found of unique interest. From a core of 304 acres (123 ha), it has grown to 1,547 acres (626 ha) of important prairie habitat. The area was designated a National Natural Landmark in 1974 and a State Nature Preserve in 1977 The sandy soil creates a variety of habitats, from oak barrens, wet prairie, including sedge meadows and prairie marshes. More than 350 native species of vascular plants have been identified. A minimum of 43 species are uncommon in the State of Indiana.

== Description ==
Wheelchair accessible The first 0.15 miles (0.24 km) is considered to be wheelchair accessible. It is a wide gravel path. Visitors can travel partway into the prairie, along the 'old field' restoration area on the west. A line of trees on the east open to provide views into the prairie marsh.

The trails into the prairie are chipped bark pathways, which can have the surrounding grasses and forbs leaning across them. They are only a single file track in width and not suitable for walkers or persons walking side by side.

Prairie marsh trail is a 0.25 miles (0.40 km) circular trail from just beyond the midpoint of the accessible trail back to the end of the accessible trail.

Savanna trail is 0.3 miles (0.48 km) circular trail from the eastern edge of the Prairie marsh trail, returning to the same point on the marsh trail.

== Location ==
The prairie is located on West Main Street, Griffith, Indiana. The area is accessible from a parking lot on Main Street (E 53rd St) just east of Kennedy Avenue. A trail, leads off through the prairie to the east.

== Wildlife and plants ==
Rare habitats exist in the Hoosier Prairie Preserve, including the dry black oak barrens, wetland pools, and moist prairies. The areas support over 350 native plants. Of these, 43 are uncommon or rarely seen within Indiana. These rare plants include the white wild indigo, prairie parsley, Indian paintbrush, rose pogonia and the tall Indian grass. Some unusual creatures seen in the prairie include the red-headed woodpecker, sedge wrens and the brown butterfly. Among the prairie "potholes", which hold water most of the year, there will be reptiles and amphibians.

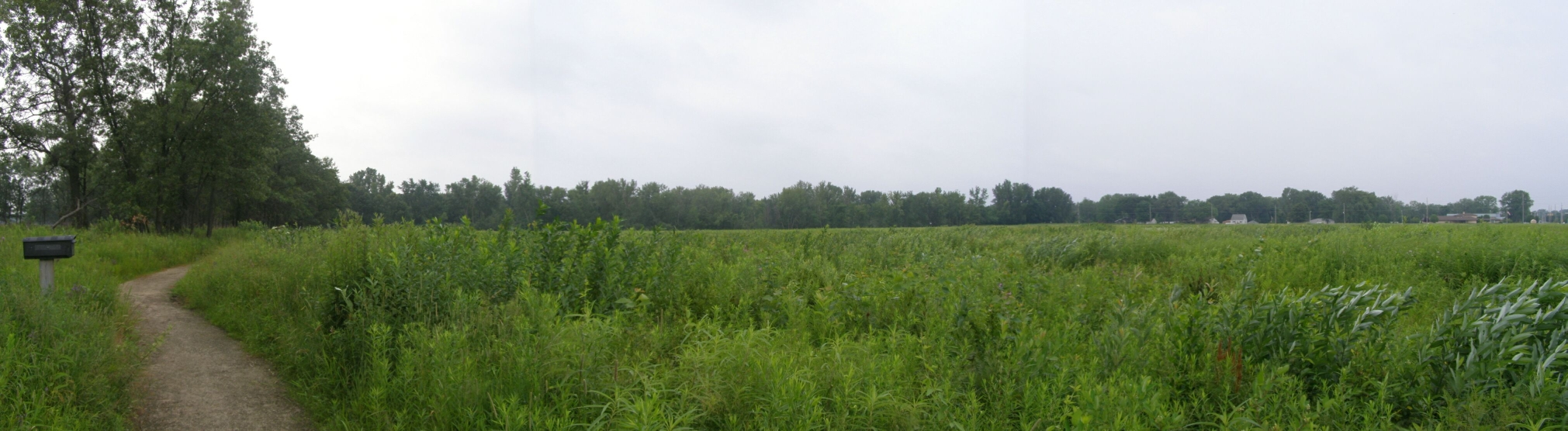
Restoration field at Hoosier Prairie - Accessible trail visible on the left

== Restoration ==
The field where the parking lot is located along Main Street, south and west towards Kennedy Avenue is an old wheat field. As late at 1970, it was planted in 30 acres (12 ha) of winter wheat. It was purchased as a buffer for the prairie. With little assistance, the field has begun to revert to native prairie. Prairie maintenance is dependent upon a natural regime of fire, which has been suppressed in this urban area. Therefore, the Indiana Department of Natural Resources has assisted the regeneration by mechanically removing trees, woody brush and implementing 'prescribed fires'. Evidence of the success of the restoration can be seen in the increase in prairie indicator plants and birds:

- Flora (Plants)
  - Big bluestem
  - Tall coreopsis
  - Goldenrod
  - Asters
- Fauna (specifically birds)
  - Meadowlarks
  - Sparrows
  - Goldfinch
  - Bobolink

== Prairie marsh trail ==
The Prairie Marsh trail is a 0.25 miles (0.40 km) loop trail that passes through two habitats, a tallgrass prairie and a marsh. This area is considered a virgin prairie as it has never been tilled or grazed. Both the prairie and the marsh are dependent upon fire to maintain their openness and diversity of plant life. The prairie continues to exist because the plants have adapted to fire by developing roots structures that survive underground as the fire sweeps across the surface removing woody and non-prairie plants. The specialized root structures include rhizomes, bulbs, corms, and tubers. Prairie plants send their roots down a few inches to as much as 16 feet (4.9 m). Each plant can expand its territory horizontally through its roots, depending on the species from 5 to 20 feet (1.5 to 6.1 m).

Indicator Species

- Big bluestem
- Indian grass
- White wild indigo
- Wild quinine
- Rattlesnake master
- Leadplant

== Savanna trail ==
The Savanna trail is a 0.3 miles (0.48 km) loop trail from the eastern edge of the Marsh trail. This habitat mimics the pine savannas in the Northern Woods allowing brackens and sweetferns to thrive amid the prairie vegetation. This is an Oak Savanna with widely spaced trees, predominately oaks surrounded by an understory of wildflowers and grasses. These savannas can survive through droughts because the oaks and the prairie plants have taproots that reach down to the water table. Beyond the oaks is an open 'wet prairie' which includes a variety species that are more common in wetlands than prairies.

Indicator Species

- Savanna
  - Sweetfern
  - Bracken
  - Black oaks
  - White oaks
- lowlands or wet prairie
  - Prairie cordgrass
  - Bluejoint grass
  - Sedges
  - Pink orchid
  - Marsh blazing starr
  - Prairie sundrops
  - marsh phlox - Phlox glaberrima

== See also ==
- Cowles Bog
- Pinhook Bog
- Indiana Dunes National Park
- Indiana Dunes State Park
