= 2000 United States presidential election in Indiana =

- November 7, 2000
- Turnout: 58.5% ▲2.7 pp

Nominee	George W. Bush	Al Gore
Party	Republican	Democratic
Home state	Texas	Tennessee
Running mate	Dick Cheney	Joe Lieberman
Electoral vote	12	0
Popular vote	1,245,836	901,980
Percentage	56.65%	41.01%

Bush
40–50%
50–60%
60–70%
70–80%
Gore
40–50%
50–60%
60–70%
President before election
Bill Clinton
Democratic
Elected President
George W. Bush
Republican

A presidential election was held in Indiana on November 7, 2000, and was part of the 2000 United States presidential election. The Republican ticket of the governor of Texas George W. Bush and the former U.S. secretary of defense Dick Cheney defeated the Democratic ticket of the vice president of the United States Al Gore and the junior U.S. senator from Connecticut Joe Lieberman. Bush defeated Gore in the national election with 271 electoral votes.

== Primary elections ==
=== Republican Party ===
Indiana Republican primary, May 2, 2000
Party	Candidate	Votes	%
Republican	George W. Bush	330,095	81.17
Republican	John McCain (withdrawn)	76,569	18.83
Total votes		406,664	100.00

=== Democratic Party ===
Indiana Democratic primary, May 2, 2000
Party	Candidate	Votes	%
Democratic	Al Gore	219,604	74.91
Democratic	Bill Bradley (withdrawn)	64,339	21.94
Democratic	Lyndon LaRouche	9,229	3.15
Total votes		293,172	100.00

=== Reform Party ===
Indiana Reform primary, July 4–August 10, 1996
Party	Candidate	Votes	%
Reform	Pat Buchanan	931	77.39
Reform	John Hagelin	272	22.61
Total votes		1,203	100.00

== General election ==
=== Polling ===
Poll source	Date(s)	Sample size	Margin of error	George W. Bush (R)	Al Gore (D)	Ralph Nader (G)	Other / undecided (Note: Calculated by taking the difference of 100% and all other listed candidates combined. For polls that do not report a figure for Nader, this includes his support.)
Harris Insights & Analytics	November 3, 2000	5,599	—	56%	39%	1%	4%
SurveyUSA	November 2, 2000	500	—	60%	32%	—	8%
Rasmussen Reports	October 30, 2000	723	—	52%	33%	—	15%
Market Shares Corp.	October 27, 2000	600	—	53%	30%	—	17%

=== Results ===
2000 United States presidential election in Indiana
Party	Candidate	Votes	%	±%
Republican	George W. Bush Dick Cheney	1,245,836	56.65	▲9.52
Democratic	Al Gore Joe Lieberman	901,980	41.01	▼0.54
Green	Ralph Nader (write-in) Winona LaDuke (write-in)	18,506	0.84	▲0.79
Independent	Pat Buchanan (Note: Buchanan and Foster were the national nominees of the Reform Party of the United States of America.) Ezola Foster	16,959	0.77	▼9.73
Libertarian	Harry Browne Art Olivier	15,530	0.71	▲0.02
Natural Law	John Hagelin (write-in) Nat Goldhaber (write-in)	198	0.01	Steady
Constitution	Howard Phillips (write-in) J. Curtis Frazier (write-in)	197	0.01	▼0.01
Independent	David McReynolds (write-in) (Note: McReynolds was the national nominee of the Socialist Party USA.) N/A (Note: McReynolds had no registered running mate in Indiana.)	43	0.00	Steady
Independent	Joe Schriner (write-in) N/A (Note: Schriner had no registered running mate in Indiana.)	24	0.00	▲0.00
Independent	Keith Judd (write-in) N/A (Note: Judd had no registered running mate in Indiana.)	15	0.00	▲0.00
Independent Republican	David Harold Bircher (write-in) N/A (Note: Bircher had no registered running mate in Indiana.)	8	0.00	▲0.00
Veterans Industrial	Earnest Lee Easton (write-in) N/A (Note: Easton had no registered running mate in Indiana.)	5	0.00	▲0.00
Independent	Gloria Dawn Strickland (write-in) N/A (Note: Strickland had no registered running mate in Indiana.)	4	0.00	▲0.00
Total votes		2,199,305	100.00	

==== By county ====
Bush carried Vigo County, Indiana, which voted for the successful presidential candidate in every election from 1956 to 2016. This is the most recent presidential election in which the Democratic ticket carried Scott County, Indiana. Bush became the first Republican presidential candidate to win the national election without carrying LaPorte County since Benjamin Harrison in 1888 United States presidential election.

County	George W. Bush Republican		Al Gore Democratic		Various candidates Other parties		Margin		Total
County	#	%	#	%	#	%	#	%	Total
Adams	8,555	67.95%	3,775	29.98%	260	2.07%	4,780	37.97%	12,590
Allen	70,426	61.60%	41,636	36.42%	2,258	1.98%	28,790	25.18%	114,320
Bartholomew	16,200	62.87%	9,015	34.98%	554	2.15%	7,185	27.89%	25,769
Benton	2,441	63.01%	1,328	34.28%	105	2.71%	1,113	28.73%	3,874
Blackford	2,699	55.16%	2,103	42.98%	91	1.86%	596	12.18%	4,893
Boone	13,161	71.54%	4,763	25.89%	472	2.57%	8,398	45.65%	18,396
Brown	3,871	56.78%	2,608	38.26%	338	4.96%	1,263	18.52%	6,817
Carroll	5,102	61.71%	2,965	35.86%	201	2.43%	2,137	25.85%	8,268
Cass	9,305	61.60%	5,412	35.83%	389	2.58%	3,893	25.77%	15,106
Clark	19,417	52.01%	17,360	46.50%	559	1.50%	2,057	5.51%	37,336
Clay	6,393	62.94%	3,605	35.49%	160	1.58%	2,788	27.45%	10,158
Clinton	7,141	64.97%	3,643	33.15%	207	1.88%	3,498	31.82%	10,991
Crawford	2,327	55.29%	1,817	43.17%	65	1.54%	510	12.12%	4,209
Daviess	6,872	70.40%	2,697	27.63%	192	1.97%	4,175	42.77%	9,761
Dearborn	11,452	64.88%	6,020	34.11%	178	1.01%	5,432	30.77%	17,650
Decatur	6,115	66.68%	2,889	31.50%	167	1.82%	3,226	35.18%	9,171
DeKalb	8,701	63.12%	4,776	34.65%	308	2.23%	3,925	28.47%	13,785
Delaware	22,105	50.07%	20,876	47.29%	1,166	2.64%	1,229	2.78%	44,147
Dubois	10,134	65.36%	5,090	32.83%	280	1.81%	5,044	32.53%	15,504
Elkhart	36,756	67.46%	16,402	30.11%	1,324	2.43%	20,354	37.35%	54,482
Fayette	5,060	58.52%	3,415	39.49%	172	1.99%	1,645	19.03%	8,647
Floyd	16,486	54.90%	13,209	43.99%	335	1.12%	3,277	10.91%	30,030
Fountain	4,408	60.54%	2,717	37.32%	156	2.14%	1,691	23.22%	7,281
Franklin	5,587	67.00%	2,591	31.07%	161	1.93%	2,996	35.93%	8,339
Fulton	5,218	62.66%	2,960	35.55%	149	1.79%	2,258	27.11%	8,327
Gibson	7,734	56.16%	5,802	42.13%	236	1.71%	1,932	14.03%	13,772
Grant	16,153	61.22%	9,712	36.81%	521	1.97%	6,441	24.41%	26,386
Greene	7,452	59.05%	4,898	38.81%	269	2.13%	2,554	20.24%	12,619
Hamilton	56,372	74.25%	18,002	23.71%	1,552	2.04%	38,370	50.54%	75,926
Hancock	15,943	69.47%	6,503	28.34%	504	2.20%	9,440	41.13%	22,950
Harrison	8,711	58.48%	5,870	39.41%	315	2.11%	2,841	19.07%	14,896
Hendricks	28,651	71.23%	10,786	26.82%	784	1.95%	17,865	44.41%	40,221
Henry	10,321	56.35%	7,647	41.75%	347	1.89%	2,674	14.60%	18,315
Howard	20,331	59.63%	12,899	37.83%	865	2.54%	7,432	21.80%	34,095
Huntington	10,113	69.17%	4,119	28.17%	388	2.65%	5,994	41.00%	14,620
Jackson	9,054	62.01%	5,330	36.50%	218	1.49%	3,724	25.51%	14,602
Jasper	7,212	64.58%	3,744	33.53%	211	1.89%	3,468	31.05%	11,167
Jay	4,687	58.37%	3,167	39.44%	176	2.19%	1,520	18.93%	8,030
Jefferson	6,582	55.17%	5,117	42.89%	232	1.94%	1,465	12.28%	11,931
Jennings	5,732	60.37%	3,549	37.38%	213	2.24%	2,183	22.99%	9,494
Johnson	29,404	69.54%	11,952	28.27%	928	2.19%	17,452	41.27%	42,284
Knox	8,485	56.36%	6,300	41.85%	269	1.79%	2,185	14.51%	15,054
Kosciusko	19,040	75.30%	5,785	22.88%	459	1.82%	13,255	52.42%	25,284
LaGrange	5,437	65.25%	2,733	32.80%	163	1.96%	2,704	32.45%	8,333
Lake	63,389	36.02%	109,078	61.98%	3,527	2.00%	-45,689	-25.96%	175,994
LaPorte	18,994	47.79%	19,736	49.65%	1,017	2.56%	-742	-1.86%	39,747
Lawrence	10,677	66.14%	5,071	31.41%	394	2.44%	5,606	34.73%	16,142
Madison	27,956	53.54%	23,403	44.82%	857	1.64%	4,553	8.72%	52,216
Marion	137,810	49.23%	134,189	47.94%	7,904	2.82%	3,621	1.29%	279,903
Marshall	10,266	63.57%	5,541	34.31%	343	2.12%	4,725	29.26%	16,150
Martin	3,008	65.26%	1,518	32.94%	83	1.80%	1,490	32.32%	4,609
Miami	8,401	64.98%	4,155	32.14%	372	2.88%	4,246	32.84%	12,928
Monroe	19,147	47.61%	17,523	43.57%	3,550	8.83%	1,624	4.04%	40,220
Montgomery	8,891	67.87%	3,899	29.76%	311	2.37%	4,992	38.11%	13,101
Morgan	15,286	69.37%	6,228	28.26%	522	2.37%	9,058	41.11%	22,036
Newton	3,250	58.98%	2,101	38.13%	159	2.89%	1,149	20.85%	5,510
Noble	9,103	64.03%	4,822	33.92%	291	2.05%	4,281	30.11%	14,216
Ohio	1,515	60.79%	951	38.16%	26	1.04%	564	22.63%	2,492
Orange	4,687	62.85%	2,601	34.88%	170	2.28%	2,086	27.97%	7,458
Owen	4,019	61.80%	2,253	34.65%	231	3.55%	1,766	27.15%	6,503
Parke	3,841	59.58%	2,481	38.48%	125	1.94%	1,360	21.10%	6,447
Perry	3,461	46.85%	3,823	51.75%	103	1.39%	-362	-4.90%	7,387
Pike	3,566	56.59%	2,605	41.34%	131	2.08%	961	15.25%	6,302
Porter	31,157	52.47%	26,790	45.12%	1,431	2.41%	4,367	7.35%	59,378
Posey	6,498	58.49%	4,430	39.87%	182	1.64%	2,068	18.62%	11,110
Pulaski	3,497	63.37%	1,919	34.78%	102	1.85%	1,578	28.59%	5,518
Putnam	7,352	61.93%	4,123	34.73%	396	3.34%	3,229	27.20%	11,871
Randolph	6,020	59.42%	3,906	38.55%	206	2.03%	2,114	20.87%	10,132
Ripley	6,988	65.46%	3,498	32.77%	189	1.77%	3,490	32.69%	10,675
Rush	4,749	65.20%	2,370	32.54%	165	2.27%	2,379	32.66%	7,284
Scott	3,761	47.94%	3,915	49.90%	170	2.17%	-154	-1.96%	7,846
Shelby	9,590	62.64%	5,374	35.10%	346	2.26%	4,216	27.54%	15,310
Spencer	5,096	56.70%	3,752	41.75%	139	1.55%	1,344	14.95%	8,987
St. Joseph	47,581	48.81%	47,703	48.94%	2,190	2.25%	-122	-0.13%	97,474
Starke	4,349	49.98%	4,136	47.53%	216	2.48%	213	2.45%	8,701
Steuben	6,953	61.66%	4,103	36.38%	221	1.96%	2,850	25.28%	11,277
Sullivan	4,319	52.28%	3,833	46.39%	110	1.33%	486	5.89%	8,262
Switzerland	1,831	56.53%	1,336	41.25%	72	2.22%	495	15.28%	3,239
Tippecanoe	26,106	56.39%	18,220	39.36%	1,969	4.25%	7,886	17.03%	46,295
Tipton	4,784	65.39%	2,392	32.70%	140	1.91%	2,392	32.69%	7,316
Union	1,838	64.99%	927	32.78%	63	2.23%	911	32.21%	2,828
Vanderburgh	35,846	54.13%	29,222	44.13%	1,153	1.74%	6,624	10.00%	66,221
Vermillion	3,130	47.19%	3,370	50.81%	133	2.01%	-240	-3.62%	6,633
Vigo	18,021	49.74%	17,570	48.50%	637	1.76%	451	1.24%	36,228
Wabash	8,321	64.59%	4,277	33.20%	285	2.21%	4,044	31.39%	12,883
Warren	2,218	58.86%	1,471	39.04%	79	2.10%	747	19.82%	3,768
Warrick	13,205	59.19%	8,749	39.22%	355	1.59%	4,456	19.97%	22,309
Washington	5,868	59.87%	3,675	37.50%	258	2.63%	2,193	22.37%	9,801
Wayne	14,273	56.75%	10,273	40.85%	605	2.41%	4,000	15.90%	25,151
Wells	7,755	68.74%	3,319	29.42%	207	1.83%	4,436	39.32%	11,281
White	6,037	60.96%	3,655	36.90%	212	2.14%	2,382	24.06%	9,904
Whitley	8,080	64.99%	4,107	33.04%	245	1.97%	3,973	31.95%	12,432
Totals	1,245,836	56.65%	901,980	41.01%	51,486	2.34%	343,856	15.64%	2,199,302

===== Counties that flipped from Democratic to Republican =====
- Blackford
- Clark
- Crawford
- Delaware
- Floyd
- Gibson
- Jefferson
- Knox
- Madison
- Monroe
- Pike
- Porter
- Posey
- Spencer
- Starke
- Sullivan
- Switzerland
- Vanderburgh
- Vigo
- Warrick

==== By congressional district ====
2000 United States presidential election in Indiana by congressional district
District	Bush	Gore	Representative
1st	38%	58%	Pete Visclosky
2nd	55%	41%	David M. McIntosh
2nd	55%	41%	Mike Pence
3rd	55%	42%	Tim Roemer
4th	62%	34%	Mark Souder
5th	60%	36%	Steve Buyer
6th	67%	28%	Dan Burton
7th	60%	35%	Edward A. Pease
7th	60%	35%	Brian D. Kerns
8th	55%	40%	John Hostettler
9th	57%	39%	Baron Hill
10th	38%	59%	Julia Carson

== Electors ==
Voters in Indiana chose 12 electors in accordance with Article Two of the United States Constitution, which provides that each state appoint a number of electors equal to its representation in the United States Congress. Since 1936, Indiana's electors have been selected by block voting in a statewide general election. The electors meet in the Indiana House of Representatives chamber of the Indiana Statehouse in Indianapolis on the second Wednesday in December following the election and vote for president and vice president.

The following electors were nominated by the Indiana Republican Party and voted for Bush and Cheney at the meeting of the Indiana Electoral College on December 18, 2000.

1. Rodric D. Bray
2. Roger A. Chiabai
3. Beverly Gard
4. Don Heckard
5. Marla Irving
6. Virginia Lee
7. P.E. MacAllister
8. Barbara L. McClellan
9. Michael D. McDaniel
10. Max Middendorf
11. Michael Miner
12. Virgil Scheidt

== See also ==
- United States presidential elections in Indiana

== Bibliography ==
- Congressional Quarterly (2010). Congressional Quarterly's Guide to U.S. Elections (6th ed.). Washington D.C.: Congressional Quarterly.
- Gilroy, Sue Anne (2000). 2000 Election Report State of Indiana. Indianapolis: Indiana Election Division.
- Indiana Election Division (2020). Presidential Electors FAQ (PDF). [Indianapolis]: Indiana Secretary of State.
- Jamieson, Amie; Shin, Hyon B.; Day, Jenniver (2002). Voting and Registration in the Election of November 2000. Washington, D.C.: United States Department of Commerce.
- Menendez, Albert J. (2009). The Geography of Presidential Elections in the United States, 1868–2004. Jefferson, NC: McFarland and Company.
- Park-Egan, Kiernan (n.d.). "2000 Presidential General Election Results, Results by Congressional District". Atlas of U.S. Presidential Election Results.
