= Michael Crider =

American politician

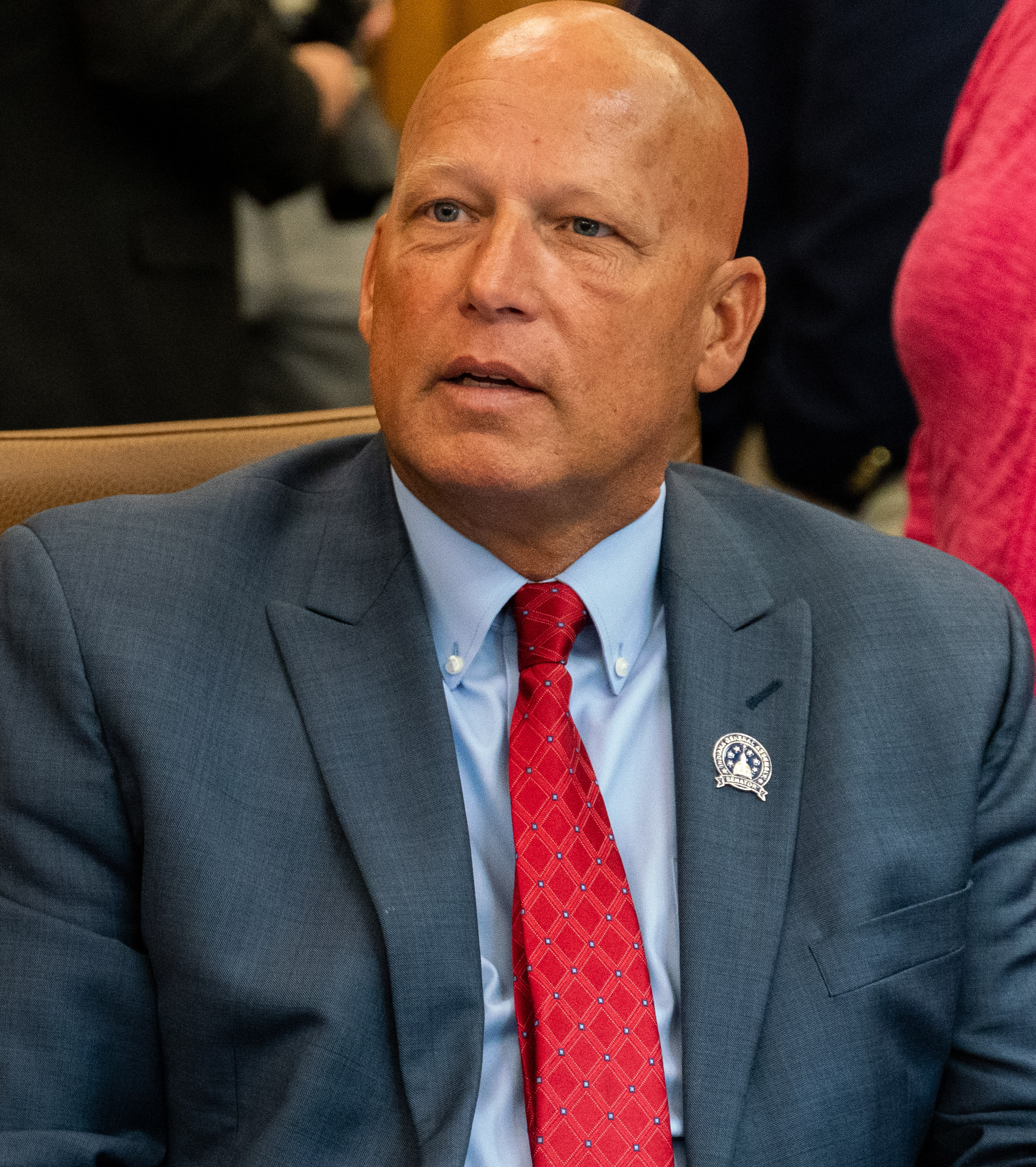

Member of the Indiana Senate from the 28th district
- Incumbent
- Assumed office 2012
- Preceded by: Beverly Gard

Director of Law Enforcement for the Indiana Department of Natural Resources
- In office 2006–2010
- Governor: Mitch Daniels
- Preceded by: Robert E. Carter Jr.
- Succeeded by: Scotty Wilson

Personal details
- Party: Republican
- Spouse: Sherri Crider
- Children: 2
- Education: Indiana Law Enforcement Academy; FBI National Academy

Michael R. Crider is an Indiana politician who has represented District 28 of the Indiana Senate since 2012, currently serving as the Majority Whip. He previously served as Director of Law Enforcement for the Indiana Department of Natural Resources from 2006 to 2010. Crider ran for the Republican nomination for Indiana's 6th congressional district in 2018, but he dropped out in December 2017.

== Education ==
Crider graduated from the Indiana Law Enforcement Academy in 1981, and the FBI National Academy in 2003.

== Career ==
Crider has introduced legislation to regulate ownership of large predatory animals multiple times.

In 2021, he authored legislation that now allows mental health professionals to "diagnose and refer an individual to start mental health treatment." The National Association of Social Workers’ Indiana Chapter awarded Crider their 2021 Public Elected Official of the Year Award for his work on the bill. He was also awarded a 2021 Conservation Champion Award from the Indiana Wildlife Federation for his "efforts at the statehouse to keep our parks and outdoor recreation areas accessible for all Hoosiers."

=== Committees ===
- Homeland Security and Transportation, Chair
- Veterans Affairs and the Military, Ranking Member
- Appropriations
- Health and Provider Services
- Rules and Legislative Procedure

== Personal life ==
Crider is married to Sherri and has two children and six grandchildren.
