= Indiana Dunes State Park =

State park in Indiana, United States

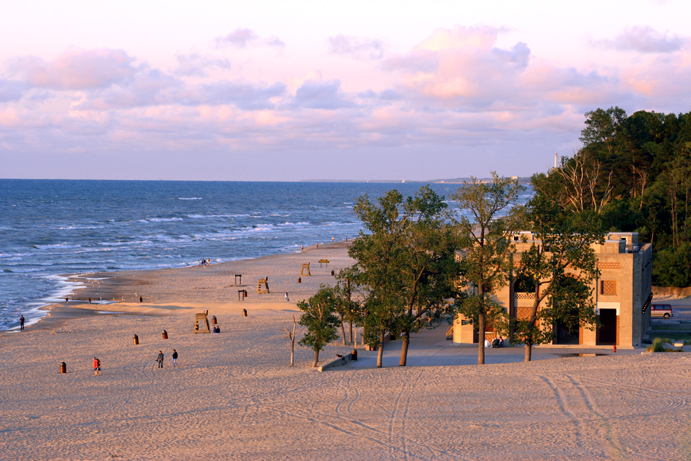
- Interactive map of Indiana Dunes State Park
- Type: State Park; National Natural Landmark
- Location: Porter County, Indiana, United States
- Nearest city: Chesterton, Indiana
- Coordinates: 41°40′N 87°02′W
- Area: 2,182 acres (883 ha)
- Created: 1925
- Operator: Indiana Department of Natural Resources
- Visitors: 1,367,194 (in 2018–2019)
- Status: Open all year
- Website: Official Website

Indiana Dunes State Park is an Indiana state park located in Porter County, Indiana, United States, 47 miles (75.6 km) east of Chicago. The park is bounded by Lake Michigan to the northwest and is surrounded by as well as within the authorized boundaries of Indiana Dunes National Park, a unit of the National Park Service; the NPS owns the water from the ordinary high water mark to 300 feet (91 m) offshore. The 1,530-acre (619.2 ha) Dunes Nature Preserve makes up the bulk of eastern part of the park, and includes most of the park's hiking trails and dune landscape. This was one of the first places Richard Lieber considered when establishing the Indiana State Park system. Like all Indiana state parks, there is a fee for entrance. Indiana Dunes State Park was established in 1925 and designated a National Natural Landmark in 1974.

Preserving the Indiana Dunes has resulted from the efforts of many citizens and politicians. In 2018–2019, Indiana Dunes was the most-visited Indiana state park, with more than 1.3 million visitors.

== Geology ==
The beaches were formed by winds coming off Lake Michigan, which drop sand when the wind hits plants, dunes, and hills. As the lake level of Lake Michigan dropped at the end of the Ice Age, the shoreline receded, and new dunes were formed along the lakeshore. Vegetation took over the previous dunes, and eventually forests grew on top of them. There are "blowouts" along the dunes, where dead stumps were revealed after the wind blew away the sand from on top of them; the largest such blowout is Big Blowout.

== History ==
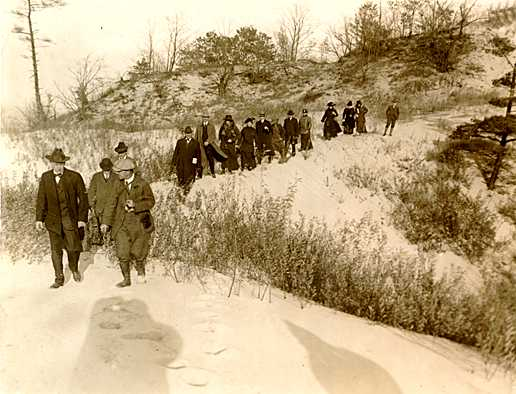
Richard Lieber (front right) with NPS Director Stephen Mather at what would become Indiana Dunes State Park in 1916

Human presence in the Indiana Dunes has existed since the retreat of the glaciers some 14,000 years ago. The southern lakes area was a rich hunting ground and there is little evidence of permanent communities forming during the earlier years. Archeological evidence is consistent with seasonal hunting camps. The earliest evidence for permanent camps is consistent with the Hopewellian occupation of the Ohio valley. Five groups of mounds have been documented in the dunes area. These mounds would be consistent with the period of 200 BCE (Goodall focus) to 800 CE (early Mississippian). The advent of European exploration and trade introduced more changes to the human environment. Tribal animosities and traditional European competition affected tribal relations. Entire populations began moving westward, while others sought to dominate large geographic trading areas. Once again the dunes became a middle point on a journey from the east or the west. It continued to remain a key hunting ground for villages over a wide area. It wasn't until the 19th century that native villages once again were scattered through the area, but this was soon followed by European settlement. The entire coast line has since been settled and filled with homes, factories, businesses and public parks.

== Attractions ==
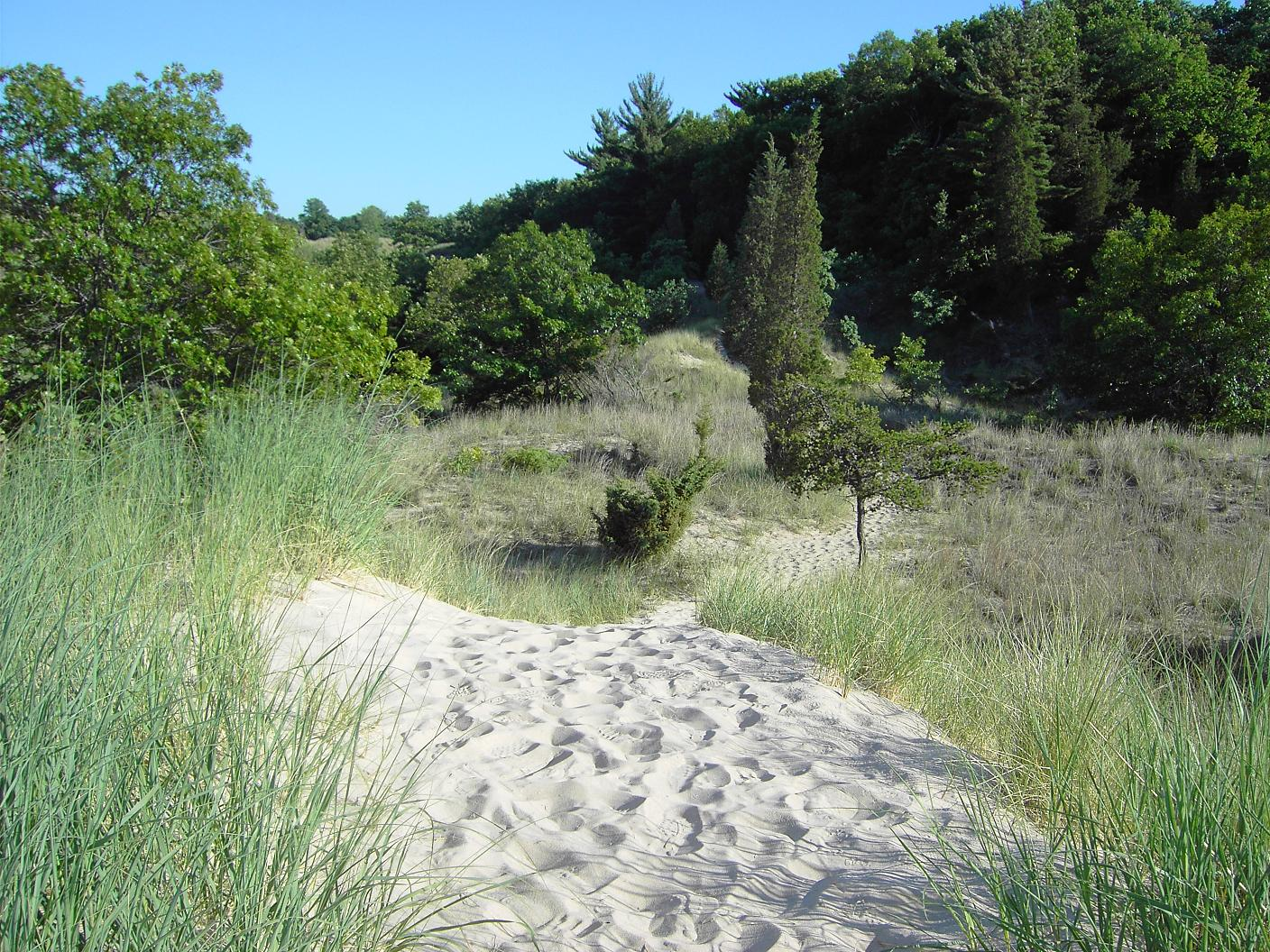
Forest growing on dunes

- Sand dunes
- Singing sand
- Smelt fishing
- Haunted shores (Diana of the Dunes)
- Birding
- Hiking
- Camping

== Facilities and activities ==
- Swimming and sunbathing: A small portion of the shoreline is set aside as a public swimming beach and is protected by lifeguards between Memorial and Labor Day weekends. It is a clean, all sand beach. The remainder of the beach (approximately 2 miles (3.2 km)) is open for sunbathing, beach combing, and other similar activities. Dogs are permitted on the non-swimming portion of the beach, so long as they are kept on a short leash and any feces is promptly and safely removed from the shores.
- Beach house with concessions during summer season.
- Observation platform near the top of Mt. Tom. Looking west, Chicago can be seen above the forested sand dunes. Gary, Indiana, is also visible.
- Birdwatching: (A bird observation tower is located along Trail 10 overlooking a marsh community.)
- Indiana Dunes State Park by South Shore Line, 1927 Broadside
  The Nature Center is a year-round facility that has a wildlife observation window, library, and a large auditorium. An interpretive naturalist provides public hikes and programs.
- Picnic Shelters

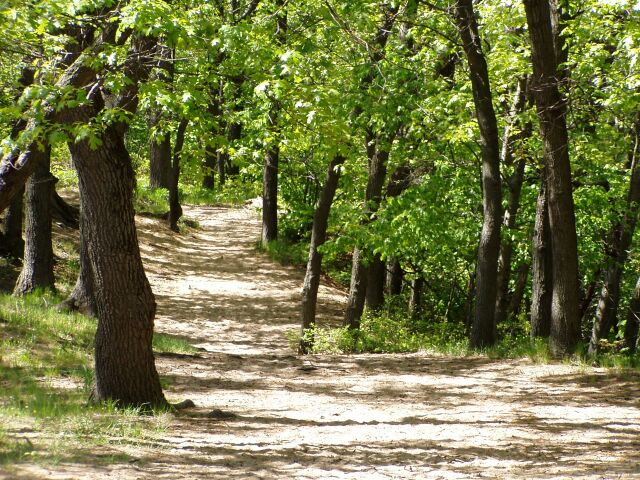
Trail #8 leads to the tops of the three highest dunes, the 'Tremonts'

- Hiking trails extend for 16 miles (26 km), some of which pass not only the sand dunes, but also historic structures and wet prairie.
- Guided hiking tours
- Cycling is not permitted everywhere within the park, but the Calumet Trail runs through the park and provides cycling opportunities in the park as well as access to Indiana Dunes National Park and some neighboring communities.
- Interpretive Naturalist Service
- Arts and crafts
- The campground was totally rebuilt in 2004. It has 140 campsites laid out on sand with new, level, asphalt pads, 50-amp electrical hook-ups, and picnic tables. Drinking water hydrants are located throughout the campground. The roads were newly laid out and paved in 2004, and are arranged in several connecting loops. Most of the trees were spared during the rebuilding so that many sites have full or partial shade. There are two large newly built shower house/restroom structures. There is a short, level forest path to the swimming beach.

== Dunes Nature Preserve ==
Dunes Nature Preserve
- Interactive map of Dunes Nature Preserve

U.S. National Natural Landmark
- Designated: 1974

The Nature Preserve covers the eastern 2/3 of the state park, 1,530 acres (620 ha). It is accessible only on foot. All eight of the park's trails enter the nature preserve, offering easy to rugged experiences amongst the dunes. The highlights of the preserve include:

- The Tremonts: Mt. Tom,192 feet (59 m) above lake level; Mt. Holden, 184 feet (56 m) above lake level; and Mt. Jackson 176 feet (54 m) above lake level.
- Beach House Blowout and Furnessville Blowout.
- The Marsh with a bird observation tower.
- Trails
  - Trail 8 goes up and over all three of the high dunes. It is 1.5 miles (2.4 km) long from the Wilson Shelter, over the high dunes, ending on the beach at the Pavilion and Beach House.
  - Trail 10 is the longest at 5.5 miles (8.9 km), but among the easier, listed as a moderate trail. It begins at the Pavilion and Bathhouse, traveling east along the open beach. About 1.25 miles (2.01 km) down the beach, is the Beach House Blowout. An additional 0.5 miles (0.80 km) further is the Furnessville Blowout. At about halfway is the eastern boundary of the park, at which point the trail enters the dunes through an area called Paradise Valley. From there, the trail parallels a branch of the Dunes Creek, passing through the Pinery and along the marsh. The Bird Observation Tower is accessible from this trail. About 0.75 miles (1.21 km) from the Observation Tower, the trail ends at the Nature Center.

Designated a National Natural Landmark in 1974, the preserve also contains the Ancient Pines Nature Area, a prehistoric forest now exposed by dune blowouts.

== Blowouts ==
Blowouts are formed by the on-shore winds of Lake Michigan. The winds move sand and pile it into dunes. As the dunes form, plants begin to take hold, stabilizing the sand. Beach grasses form a large underground system of roots. This root system creates stable areas of sand from which the dune can grow. Slowly other plants take root in the protected areas, including bearberry (kinnikinnick) and small evergreens. Over time, larger plants like sumac, sand cherry, cottonwood, and juniper take hold and replace the grasses and smaller plants.

When a nick forms in this armor of roots and plants, the area can become a blowout. First, open sand becomes accessible to the wind. This can be by animal trails or by human footpaths. A tree could fall in a strong wind, exposing the underlying sand. When this happens, the wind once again works on the loose sand. It undercuts the other roots, and begins moving sand southward. If the winds are strong enough or given enough time, a large blowout can occur, reducing the dunes to lake level over a large area. The three largest blowouts in the park are Beach House, Furnessville, and Big Blowout. Each extends into the interdunes, between the front rises of dunes and pockets, into the interdunal troughs. Big Blowout has uncovered an area of dead tree trunks known as the Tree Graveyard.

The park also has a Youth Tent Area separate from the public campground.

== See also ==
- List of Indiana state parks
- Save the Dunes
