= Mounds State Park =

State park in Indiana, United States

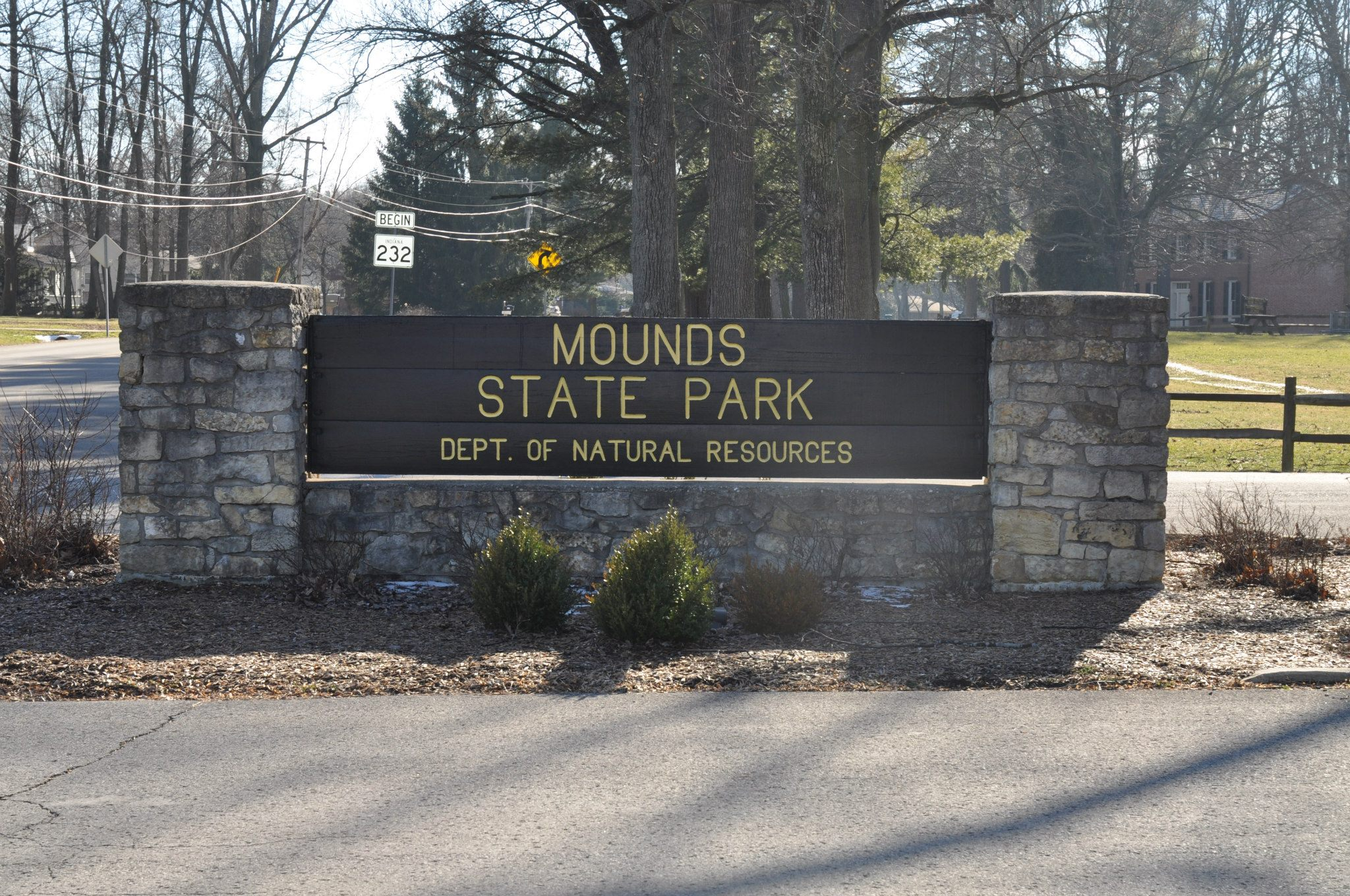
- Mounds State Park entrance sign.

- Site of park in U.S. state of Indiana
- 40°6′1.39″N 85°37′14.60″W
- Cultures: Adena culture, Hopewell tradition
- Location: Anderson, Indiana, United States
- Region: Madison County, Indiana

History
- Built: 160 BCE

Site notes
- Architectural style: earthworks
- Mounds State Park
- U.S. National Register of Historic Places
- Area: 251.8 acres (101.9 ha)
- Visitation: 394,815 (2018–2019)
- NRHP reference No.: 73000022
- Added to NRHP: January 18, 1973

Mounds State Park is a state park near Anderson, Indiana featuring Native American heritage, and ten ceremonial mounds built by the prehistoric Adena culture indigenous peoples of eastern North America, and also used centuries later by Hopewell culture inhabitants. It is separate from (and about 79 miles northwest of) the similarly named Mounds State Recreation Area (near Brookville, Indiana). The park receives about 400,000 visitors annually.

The park is 1 of 14 Indiana State Parks that were in the path of totality for the 2024 solar eclipse, with the park having 3 minutes and 45 seconds of totality.

== Earthworks ==
The term earthworks includes any structure made from the earth. In Native American studies, there are three primary types: mounds, circular enclosures, and complexes. All are found in Central Indiana and in the state park. Mounds State Park has a complex of enclosures, both circular and rectangular. There are seven enclosures and four additional earthworks, which have been divided into two groups, the northern complex and the southern complex. The Great Mound enclosure is the dominant structure in the park and the southern group.

=== Mounds ===
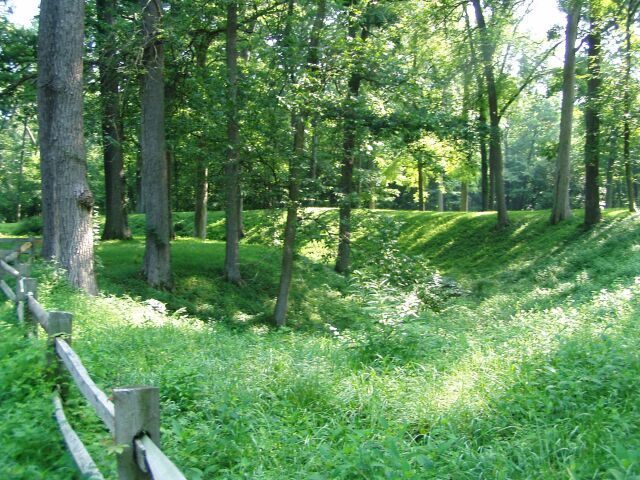
Circular mound at Mounds State Park

These earthworks were created as a dedication to the Sun God and Earth Mother. The mounds were used as gathering places for religious ceremonies as well as viewing astronomical alignments.

When working at the Anderson mounds, archeologists learned that the maps used since the late 1800s were inaccurate. Research showed that the earthworks had been misrepresented in the map. This issue is significant since it affects the context of the site. Archaeological surveys of the park have shown that people have used the land for about 10,000 years, beginning as early as 8000 B.C. and continuing through about 1400 AD.

The Dalman Mound, one of ten Adena-Hopewell earthworks has a walking trail running directly over the mound's surface.

There are believed to be 8 circular earthworks in the park, but only 4 are visible today. This area was used for rituals and has been targeted by looters in the past, who caused significant damage to the artifacts and their stratigraphy. Estimates by radiocarbon dating suggest the rituals began around 250 B.C. Another feature of this site is the fiddle-back enclosure. Although there has been no evidence of astronomical activities here, it marks the spot where the sun sets on the summer solstice.

=== Great Mound ===
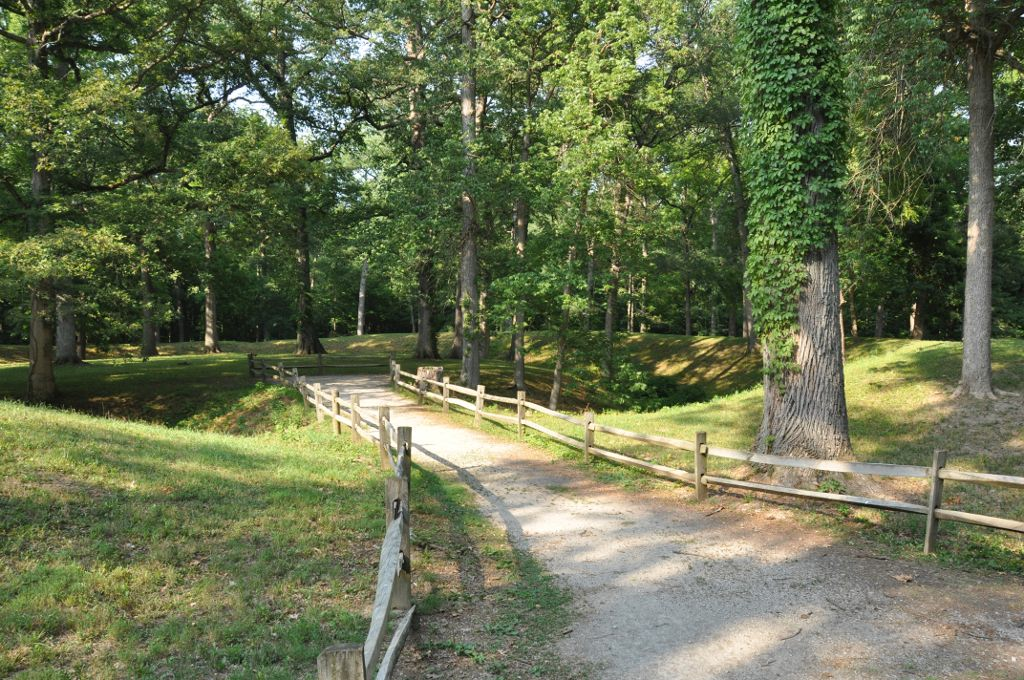
The Great Mound

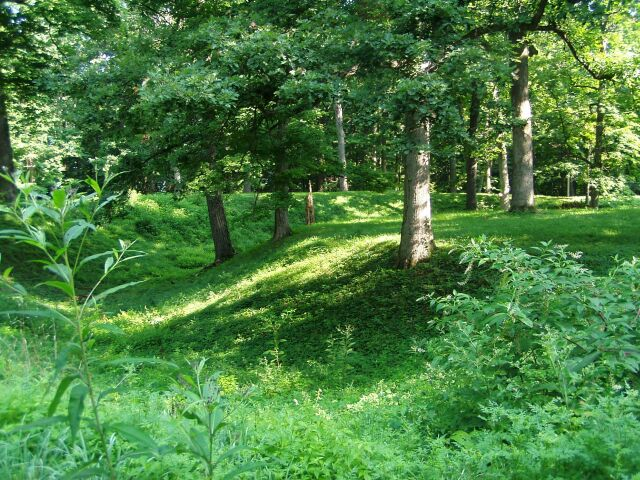
Ditch surrounding the Great Mound

The Great Mound is the largest of the ten earthworks in the Mounds State Park. The Great Mound is approximately 390 feet (120 m) across and consists of a circular outer embankment 9 feet (2.7 m) high and 63 feet (19 m) wide, surrounding a 60 feet (18 m) wide ditch that is 10.5 feet (3.2 m) deep. The central platform, 138 feet (42 m) is diameter with a central mound, 4 feet (1.2 m) high and 30 metres (98 ft) in diameter. The central mound was excavated in 1968/69 and found to have three clay layers, each with ashes, showing a succession of use periods.

The Great Mound, a circular earthwork enclosure constructed by the Adena-Hopewell peoples around 160 BCE

The complex has been dated to 160 BCE through 50 CE These dates are obtained through radiocarbon dating and some artifacts. A nearby log tomb was found with a platform pipe typical of Hopewell styles from 50 C.E. Post hole remnants were dated to 60 BCE and 230 CE. Radiocarbon dates from excavated material of the Great Mound established 160 BCE +/- 90 for the embankment. The neighboring ‘Fiddleback Mound was dated to 120 BCE +/- 70.

The three floors of the Great Mound were created by a repeated process that included adding a layer of subsoil, burning the ground, then covering the floor in a layer of powdered white calcite, made from bone, shell, and limestone. This gave the floor a clay consistency as well as deep purple color. Each floor had basins and pits of unknown purposes. Near the gateway of the mound platform, a large pit was found containing various artifacts. These artifacts included chipped stone, flakes, burned bone, a fragment of shell, fragments of mica, and burned clay chunks. Built above this pit was a log tomb, called so because the floor of the tomb was laid with logs. When excavated, two human burials were found inside the tomb; a 50-year-old adult male, and the redeposited partial remains of a cremated individual. Also, artifacts such as a limestone platform pipe, flakes, fire-cracked rocks, mica fragments, pottery, burned and unburned bone, and seven deer bone awls were found in the tomb.

A hundred years after the mound was started, the construction of the Great Mound's platform was started. Although the embankment appears random and irregular, it was carefully crafted.

The only other aboriginal features on the platform were numerous small post holes encircling the top. These holes most likely held a brush fence erected to hide sacred activities carried out on the platform. After the mound was completed, several more pits were dug, some of them spanning from the surface to the lowest floor. One pit was possibly looted, while two other pits contained human burials. No other artifacts were found in these pits.

== History ==
What is now Mounds State Park was the location of an amusement park that operated from 1897 until 1929. While the amusement park exploited the native-made mounds, it also helped to protect them by making them a point of regional pride and a destination; otherwise they might have been plundered or otherwise destroyed. When the Great Depression hit, the property was sold to the Madison County Historical Society, which transferred ownership to the State of Indiana, after which it became Mounds State Park.

Canoeing is also available in Mounds State Park on the White River.

== See also ==
- Adena culture
- Hopewell tradition
- List of Hopewell sites
- List of burial mounds in the United States
- List of archaeological sites on the National Register of Historic Places in Indiana
- List of Indiana state parks
