= Diana of the Dunes =

American intellectual and counterculture figure

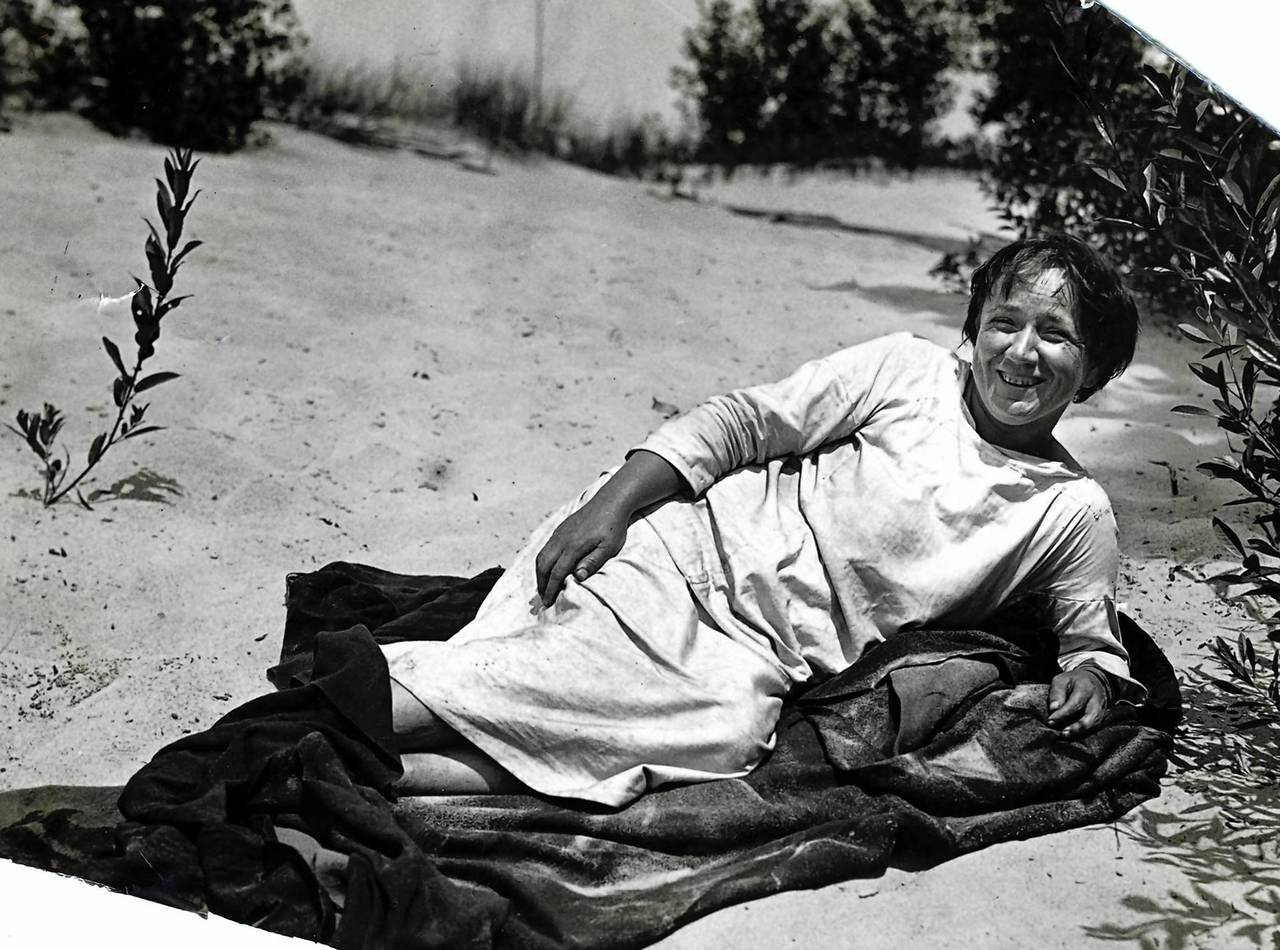
- Born: Alice Mabel Gray; March 25, 1881; Chicago, Illinois, US
- Died: March 8, 1925 (aged 44)
- Burial place: Oak Hill Cemetery, Gary, Indiana
- Education: University of Chicago

Diana of the Dunes was the nickname given to Alice Mabel Gray (1881–1925), an American intellectual and counterculture figure, whose life inspired a local legend in Chesterton, Indiana. Gray lived in primitive conditions among the sand dunes of northern Indiana and became interested in the history, ecology, and the need to preserve the area's dunes. Trained in mathematics, astronomy, and classical languages at the University of Chicago in the early 1900s, Gray rejected a wage-earning, urban life in favor a solitary existence at the Indiana Dunes. Gray's unconventional lifestyle fascinated the general public and area news reporters, who gave her the "Diana" moniker. As the Dunes became threatened by encroaching real-estate development, Gray's notoriety and the "Diana" legend brought media attention to the Dunes at an important time when the local community's support was critical in helping to establish the area as a nature preserve that became the Indiana Dunes State Park.

== Early life and education ==
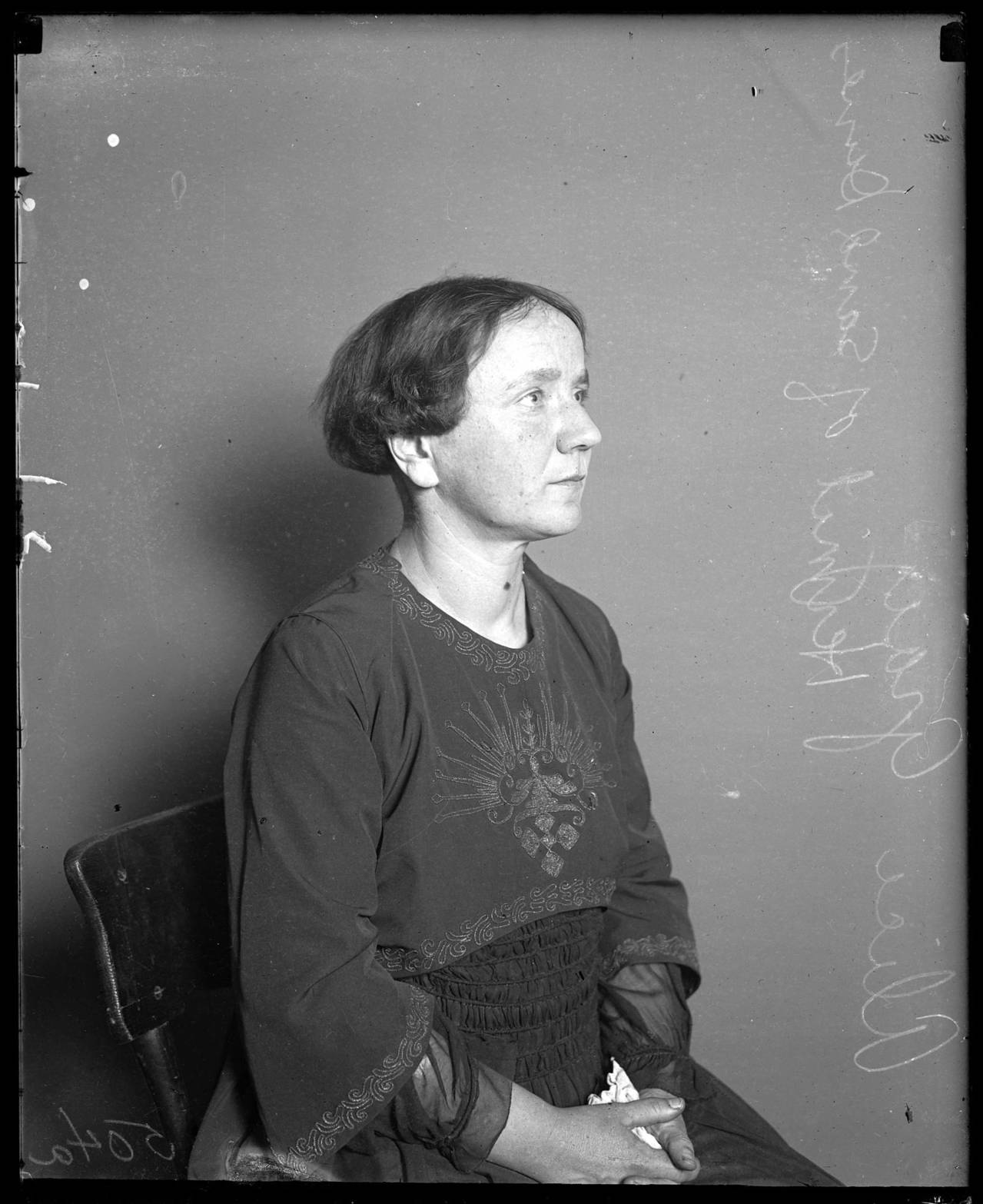
Alice Gray in Chicago. Undated studio photograph.

Alice Mabel Gray was born in Chicago on March 25, 1881. Her father was a Chicago-area laborer and she had at three brothers and two sisters. In 1897, at the age of 16, Gray entered the University of Chicago and graduated with a bachelor's degree in 1903, receiving "honorable mentions" in astronomy, mathematics, Greek, and Latin. Gray also became a member of Phi Beta Kappa society.

After college, Gray worked for the U.S. Naval Observatory, but left the position in 1905 to continue her education at the University of Göttingen and take graduate courses at the University of Chicago. She also worked as a stenographer at the University of Chicago. By 1915, Gray had become dissatisfied with her work and believed that city life was not conducive to the advancement of an educated woman. She especially disdained wage-earning labor, calling it slavery, and the constant effort required to support herself in Chicago.

During her nine years as a graduate student in Chicago, Gray was a frequent visitor to the dunes in northern Indiana and came to love the area's natural beauty. In the early twentieth century the dunelands were already undergoing a transition. Land developers viewed the area as a wasteland and a prime location for industrial development, but the resulting urbanization caused the destruction of the area's natural habitat. Between 1905 and 1908, U.S. Steel acquired dunelands in Indiana and began constructing its massive steel-production facility. The company also developed Gary, Indiana, along seven miles of the dune's shoreline. By 1909 conservation activists ramped up their crusade to preserve the natural area that remained; Gray soon played a role in this effort.

== Early years at Indiana Dunes ==
In October 1915, thirty-four-year-old Gray withdrew from conventional life in Chicago and moved to the dune country in northwestern Indiana. She arrived with only a few possessions, intending to write and to live a simpler life in the natural setting along Lake Michigan. During her first five years at the dunes, Gray lived alone in an abandoned shack she named "Driftwood" that was located near the beach. Most of the dunes at that time were inaccessible by automobile and had few inhabitants. Although hermits living in the area were not uncommon, a relatively young woman such as Gray living alone in the dunes was highly unusual.

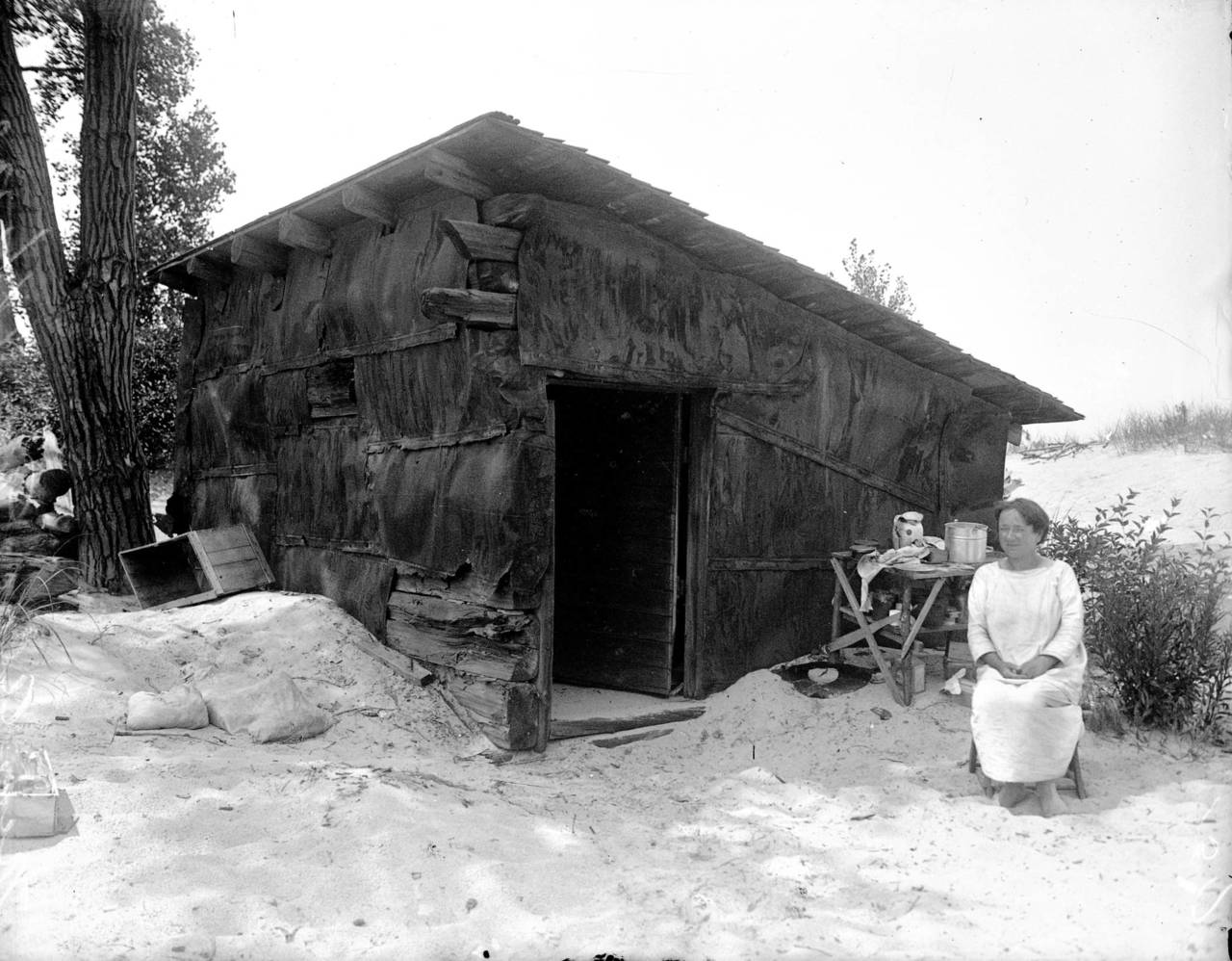
Alice Gray outside her shack, which she named "Driftwood". Photograph taken by the Chicago Tribune.

During her first five years at the dunes, Gray lived a solitary life, finding refuge in an abandoned railcar and an abandoned shack that Gray made her own driftwood furniture, ate fish and berries, and spent much of her time reading, but she did not live in complete isolation. Gray became a frequent patron of the Miller branch of the Gary public library. (Miller, Indiana, was a small lakeside community east of Gary and within walking distance of her shack.) She also made trips to Chicago to visit its museums and began to write about the ecology and history of the dunes, the need to preserve them, and her own experiences there.

After Gray managed to survive her first winter at the dunes, news reporters began to seek her out among the secluded dunes and interview her for a story. The first one was from the Chicago Examiner. Sources differ on how the reporter learned of her existence and where to find her, but legend suggests that local fishermen informed the media after they had seen her bathing nude in the lake and running along the beach to dry herself.

In an article that appeared in the Examiner on July 23, 1916, Gray explained her simple reason for living in isolation: "I want to live my own life––a free life." Within a week of the first news article, more than two dozen variations of her story appeared in area newspapers. Reporters soon nicknamed her "Diana of the Dunes" in reference to the mythological Roman goddess. The news stories, some of them highly exaggerated, described Gray as a hermit or a nymph who lived alone in a shack at the dunes, foraged for food, occasionally going to Chesterton, Indiana, to purchase provisions, or walking to the nearby public library to borrow books and magazines. Gray made no secret of her interest in natural history and the Dunes.

As Gray gained notoriety as "Diana of the Dunes," the ongoing publicity from the news stories and the folk legend about a young woman who went skinny dipping at the Indiana Dunes made her somewhat of a local celebrity. Visitors to the area tried to spot her among the dunes and view her shack from tourist boats on the lake. Additional reporters and curiosity seekers wanted to talk to her as well, but Gray tried to avoid them.

Although her growing fame hindered her privacy, a bigger issue was the real-estate development of duneland near her shack. Gray had become increasingly interested in ecology and concerned about the effects of increasing industrial development on the dunes habitat. Preservation of what remained of the Indiana Dunes became her main cause. In the late 1910s Gray began speaking publicly about the need to preserve the dunes. The highlight of her efforts was an invitation to speak, along with several others, at a major event on April 6, 1917, at the Art Institute of Chicago. Chicago's Prairie Club and other preservation groups had organized the event to rouse public interest in preserving the dunes through the establishment of a public park. In her speech Gray described the beauty of the dunes, their spiritual power, and their significance. She also explained the need to preserve them. A portion of her speech, "Chicago Kinland," was published in the Prairie Club Bulletin in 1917.

== Later years ==
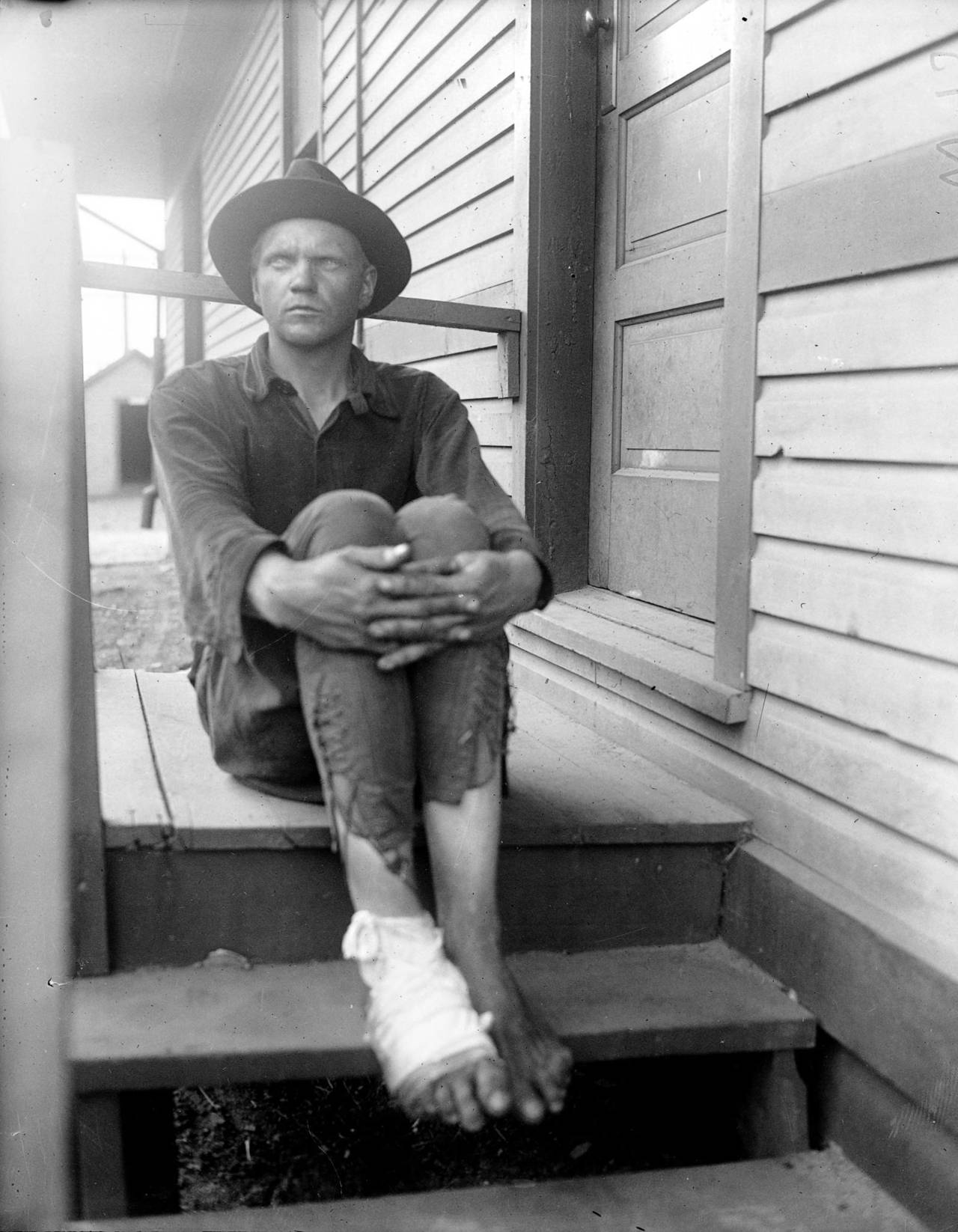
Paul Wilson, Alice Gray's husband, with an injured foot after a fight with the sheriff's deputy.

Public interest in Gray's unusual life continued after she began a relationship with Paul Wilson, a fisherman and carpenter, around 1920–21. Little is known of Wilson's early life, but locals described him as tall, about six feet two inches, with a violent and combative temper. Wilson earned money by crafting handmade furniture that he sold to local residents and tourists. Gray and Wilson shared Gray's "Driftwood" shack, but soon moved to one that they named "Wren’s Nest, " located in the western part of what became Ogden Dunes. With the exception of a few months in 1923, Gray and Wilson lived at "Wren’s Nest" until her death in 1925.

Gray's and Wilson's lives at the dunes changed for the worse in 1922 when the body of a man was discovered near "Wren's Nest." Wilson became a suspect in the man's murder. Deputy sheriff Eugene Frank also accused Gray and Wilson of robbing local cottages and stealing fish. When the couple confronted Frank about the accusations, a fight ensued. Wilson was shot in the foot and Gray suffered a skull fracture. After Gray and Wilson recovered they returned to "Wren’s Nest" and found it had been ransacked. A manuscript that Gray had reportedly been writing was allegedly taken and has never been found. Frank was charged with assault as a result of the incident, but the case was dropped after Gray and Wilson failed to appear in court. Wilson was later cleared of suspicion in the murder case, but it was never solved.

In addition to their personal troubles, the area surrounding Gray's and Wilson's shack was becoming more developed. This was especially true after 1923 when the Dunes Highway (U.S. 12) was completed between Gary and Michigan City, Indiana. The new road provided easy access to the dunes from Chicago and northern Indiana, passing within a mile of "Wren's Nest." The increase in traffic brought Gray and Wilson more unwanted visits from the press and curiosity seekers, further reducing their privacy, and they decided to leave the area. Seeking a quieter life in Texas, Gray and Wilson left the Indiana Dunes in 1923, intending to float down the Mississippi River on a 20- to 24-foot boat that had been salvaged from a steamship. For unknown reasons the couple returned to Ogden Dunes a few months later, seeking permission to return to "Wren's Nest" from the land developer who owned the property where it was located.

== Death and legacy ==
Gray died at Ogden Dunes of a heart attack on February 9, 1925. Gray was buried at Oak Hill Cemetery at Gary, Indiana. It is not known if Gray and Wilson ever married (no marriage certificate has been found), but her gravestone at Oak Lawn Cemetery reads, "Alice Gray Wilson."

Most of the details of Gray's unconventional, free-spirited life at the Indiana Dunes have come from newspaper reports and stories from local residents that have often been exaggerated, contradictory, or potentially false and subject to debate. Nevertheless, the effect of the extensive accounts only contributed to her notoriety and the legend of "Diana of the Dunes." According to legend, Diana's ghost allegedly haunts the park's shores.

Gray attained the status of a local celebrity, but her greatest legacy was her role in focusing public interest in the Indiana Dunes when the natural area was threatened by encroaching real estate development. Efforts had begun to preserve the dunes, but the local community's support was critical in helping establish the area as a nature preserve. Public interest in Gray's nonconformist lifestyle, the legends that surrounded the "Diana of the Dunes" legend, and her writings and speeches in support of preserving the area helped bring the dunes to the public's attention and eventually the creation of the Indiana Dunes State Park.
