= Dr. John and Gerda Meyer House =

Historic house in Indiana, United States

- U.S. National Register of Historic Places
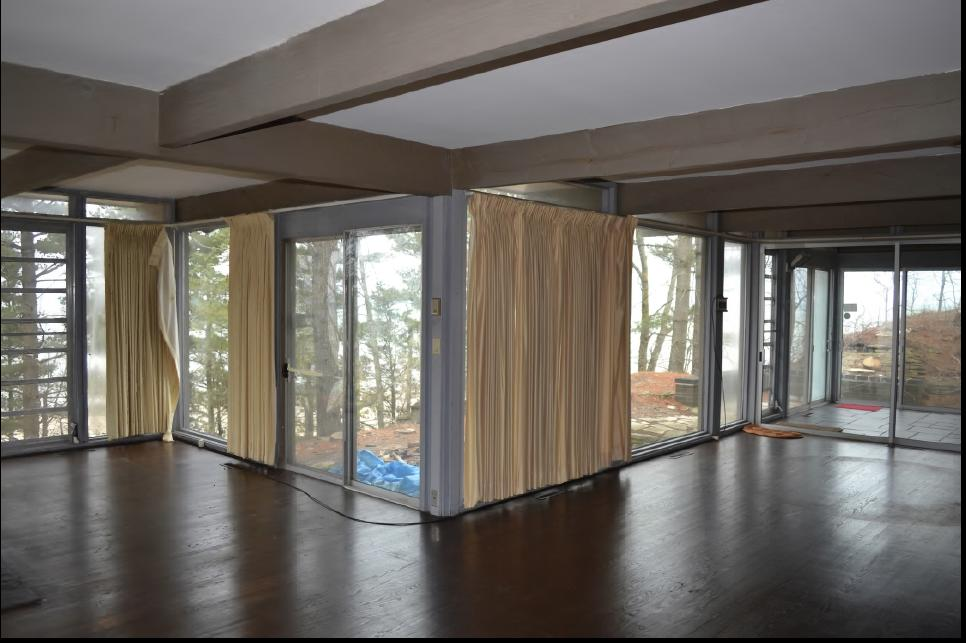
- Living space

- Location within Indiana Location within the United States
- Location: 360 West Fairwater Ave., Beverly Shores, Indiana
- Coordinates: 41°41′33″N 86°58′46″W
- Area: less than 1 acre (0.40 ha)
- Built: 1961
- Built by: Tonn and Blank
- Architect: Olin, Harold B.
- Architectural style: International Style
- NRHP reference No.: 12000974
- Added to NRHP: November 28, 2012

The Dr. John and Gerda Meyer House is an International Style designed home, in an appropriate setting on the ridge of sand dune in the lakeside resort community of Beverly Shores, Indiana. The house has a lower level that opens to the rear (south) side of the dune; the house's main level is located at the top of the dune and overlooks Lake Michigan, which is to its north. A small patio is located on the north side of the house. A staircase that is made of wood connects the patio to the base of the sand dune and Lake Front Drive. A concrete driveway and terraced wood steps connect the south side of the house to Fairwater Drive, at the base of the sand dune.

== Description ==
The lot straddles a sand dune on the south side of West Lake Front Drive. Dr. Meyer and Mr. Harold Olin, the architect for the house, planted 1,000 saplings on the lot after the house was constructed. These included several white pine trees. The intent was for native vegetation to protect the dune from erosion. A wood staircase is located on the north slope of the sand dune. It connects the house to the street below; however it is badly deteriorated. Flagstones were placed on the ground on the north side of the house to create a small patio area. Flagstones were used for a path and stepping-stones around the northwest and northeast corners. A knoll has a terrace wall composed of flagstones on the east side of the brick wall. A short concrete sidewalk is on the east side of the house supported by brick walls that are part of the house's lower level walls. The stone path connects the steps to the parking area on the south side of the house. A retaining wall composed of flagstones is located on the east side of the steps and stone path.

The south side of the house has a concrete parking area between the house and Fairwater Drive. The parking area is steeply pitched because it is on the side of the dune. A long walkway composed of terraced wood steps leads from the house to the base of the sand dune. It has wood posts on its west side; the posts once had a rope handrail.

== Exterior ==
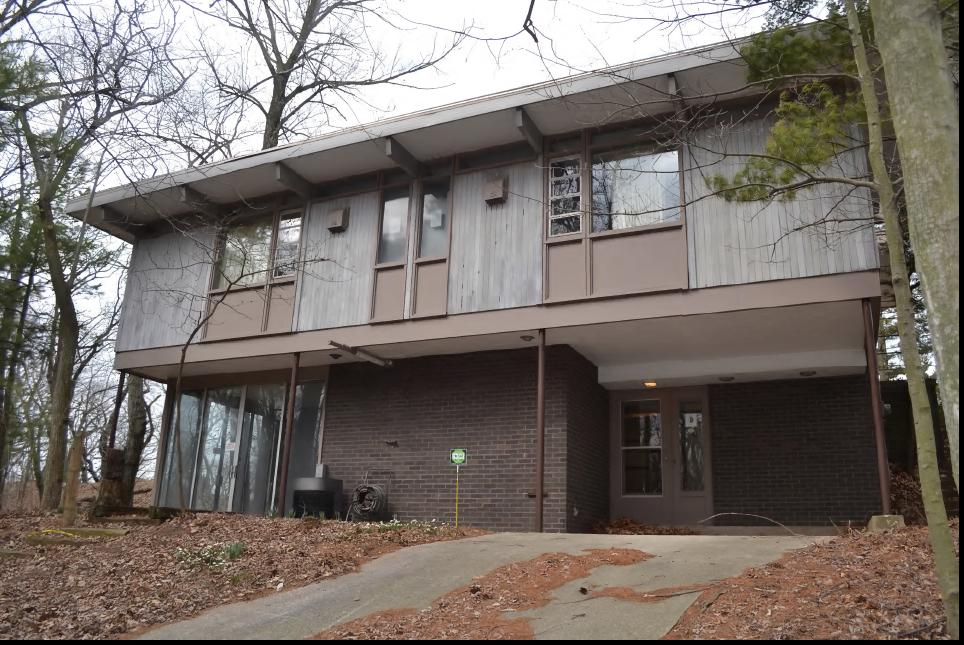
South face of the John and Gerda Meyer House, Beverly Shores, Indiana

The configuration is a small rectangular, two-story box with a flat roof. An early addition was created on the northwest corner of the house. Materials chosen for the construction of the home are contextual with the landscape. The house's lower level walls are composed of dark brown colored bricks.

This forms a "base" on which the main level appears to float. The main level is covered with redwood heartwood siding, installed vertically and stained to mimic weathered driftwood. There are large sections of glass windows and doors. The windows and doors have thin metal sashes and wood casings. A tall trim board separates the lower level from the main level between the brick walls and wood siding. The roof appears like a flat plane. The roof is supported by wood rafters spaced 10 feet (3.0 m) on center. The rafters continue through the tops of the walls and support wide overhanging eaves. The owners used the roof as a rooftop deck for viewing the lake.

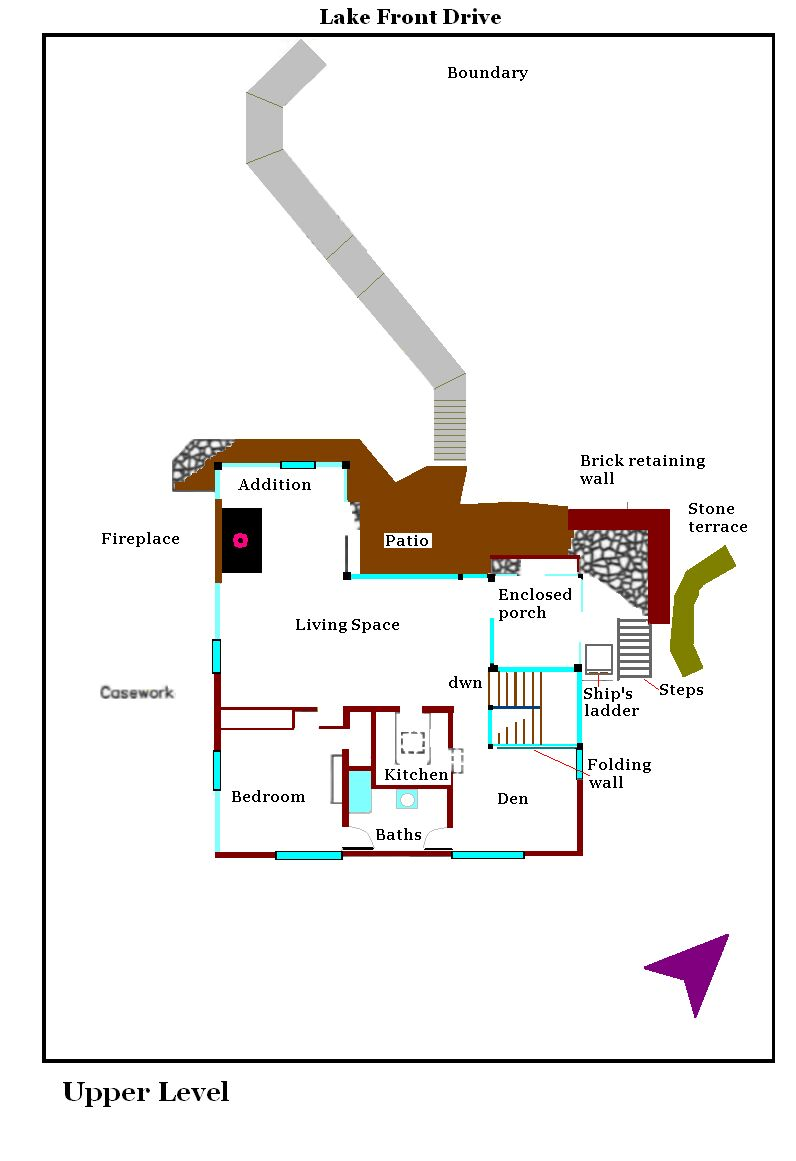
Upper level of the Meyer House, Beverly Shores, Indiana.

The south elevation has the clearest appearance of a two-story house because the lower level, which is pushed into the south side of the dune. The upper level of the house overhangs the lower level. the lower level has a wood door with a full window on its west side. A wood side-lite with a full window is on the east side of the door. A sidewalk is in front of this section of wall. A soffit with recessed lighting is against the top of the wall over the sidewalk. This area, which is sheltered by the main level above, functions as a carport. The area west of the brick wall extension was a covered patio with a concrete floor. It was enclosed with metal and glass patio doors. The enclosed patio has patio doors in the east side of its north wall; this was originally an exterior wall.

== Significance ==
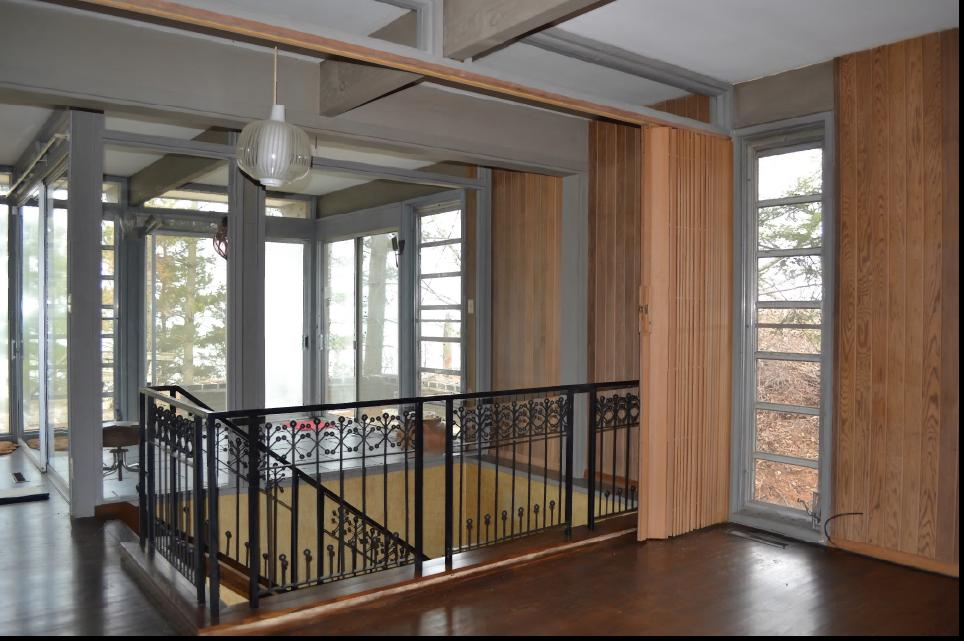
Interior stairway of the John and Gerda Meyer House, Beverly Shores, Indiana

The house is an example of the style that has been skillfully blended with its contextual landscape. The house is remarkably intact with distinctive features of the style. An addition was created early in the house's history and was designed by the architect who designed the original house for the Meyers. The addition seamlessly connects to the original house by the use of matching materials and general scale. The house is also significant as one of its former inhabitants was Irene Herlocker-Meyer.

== Bibliography ==
- Gary, Ghita "County House, City Comforts". Chicago Sunday Sun-Times. C. 1962, publication date and page unknown. The article was incorporated into Olin's book on the Meyer house.
- Curtis, William J. R. Modern Architecture Since 1900. Englewood Cliffs, NJ: Prentice-Hall, 1982.
- McAlester, Virginia & Lee. A Field Guide to American Houses. New York: Alfred A. Knopf, 2006.
- Meyer, Dr. John H. Surviving Against All Odds. Self-published through Xlibris Corporation, 2009.
- Olin, Harold B. The Irene Herlocker Meyer House. Self-published, 2008.
- Hitchcock, Henry-Russell & Johnson, Phillip, The International Style: Architecture Since 1922. New York, NY. W.W. Norton, 1932.
- Simmons, Miriam. Correspondence with the daughter of Dr. John and Gerda Meyer, April, 2012.
- Slupski, Janice, Easf Lake Front Determination of Eligibility Report: Recreational and Residential Development of the Indiana Dunes. Indiana Dunes National Lakeshore, 1996.
