= Beverly Gard =

American politician

Member of the Indiana Senate from the 28th district
- In office 1988–2012
- Preceded by: Michael Rodgers
- Succeeded by: Michael Crider

Personal details
- Born: March 8, 1940 (age 86) Hiwassee Dam, North Carolina
- Party: Republican
- Spouse: Don
- Education: University of Tennessee at Chattanooga
- Occupation: Politician

Beverly Gard (born March 8, 1940) is a Republican member of the Indiana Senate, representing the 28th District since 1988 to 2012. She ran for the Greenfield City Council in 1975 for the newly created 5th district and won. She served on the City Council from 1976 to 1988. She was succeeded by Ed Gill on the City Council.

Gard was an elector for George Bush in the 2000 election.
