= List of Indiana state parks =

Indiana State Parks (clickable map)

The U.S. state of Indiana has 25 state parks maintained and operated by Indiana Department of Natural Resources (DNR). In addition, a separate state agency operates White River State Park in downtown Indianapolis. Marion and Clark are the only counties to have two parks. Brown County, the largest state park, has the greatest number of visitors, followed by Indiana Dunes State Park.

Richard Lieber was instrumental in the foundation of the Indiana State Park system. The first state park in Indiana was McCormick's Creek State Park, in Owen County in 1916, followed in the same year by Turkey Run State Park in Parke County. The number of state parks rose steadily in the 1920s, mostly by donations of land from local authorities to the state government. Of the initial twelve parks, only Muscatatuck State Park is no longer a state park, having been given back to Jennings County in 1968. It was during the Great Depression of the 1930s that much infrastructure was built within the parks, constructed by New Deal agencies such as the Civilian Conservation Corps and the Works Progress Administration, with the majority of this Depression-era construction still in use in the 21st century. This delay in infrastructure was due in part to Richard Lieber's belief that the parks should be kept as natural as possible.

Initially, the state parks were intended to feature natural environments in Indiana. The establishment of Mounds State Park for its historical nature and Shakamak State Park (an abandoned strip mine) purely for recreational purposes represented changes from the initial purposes of the Indiana state park system.

While Indiana does not have as many state parks as some other states, it has avoided obtaining too many smaller properties that would be hard to manage. A goal of having at least one state park within an hour's drive for every Hoosier was met when Prophetstown State Park was established in 2004.

It is possible to view the Milky Way at 3 of the 25 Indiana State Parks, which are Shades State Park, Tippecanoe River State Park, and Turkey Run State Park.

== State parks ==
Park Name	Image	City	County or Counties	Year Established	Size	Remarks
Brown County		Nashville; 39.11°N 86.26°W	Brown	1929	15,776 acres (63.84 km^{2})	Largest State Park in Indiana
Chain O' Lakes		Albion; 41.33°N 85.38°W	Noble	1960	2,718 acres (11.00 km^{2})	Features eight connected kettle lakes
Charlestown		Charlestown; 38.43°N 85.63°W	Clark	1996	5,100 acres (21 km^{2})	Built on the grounds of the old Indiana Army Ammunition Plant
Clifty Falls		Madison; 38.76°N 85.42°W	Jefferson	1920	1,416 acres (5.73 km^{2})	Features a canyon that has daylight only at midday
Falls of the Ohio		Clarksville; 38.277°N 85.763°W	Clark	1990	165 acres (0.67 km^{2})	Offers views of the Falls of the Ohio and Louisville, Kentucky
Fort Harrison		Indianapolis; 39.87°N 86.01°W	Marion	1996	1,700 acres (6.9 km^{2})	Built on the site of old Fort Benjamin Harrison
Harmonie	—	New Harmony; 38.06°N 87.95°W	Posey	1966	3,465 acres (14.02 km^{2})	Near historic Rappite and Owenite villages
Indiana Dunes		Porter; 41.66°N 87.04°W	Porter	1925	2,182 acres (8.83 km^{2})	Attached to Indiana Dunes National Park
Lincoln		Lincoln City; 38.10°N 87.00°W	Spencer	1932	1,847 acres (7.47 km^{2})	Across from Lincoln Boyhood National Memorial, it was the last state park established by Richard Lieber.
McCormick's Creek		Spencer; 39.29°N 86.73°W	Owen	1916	1,924 acres (7.79 km^{2})	First state park in Indiana
Mounds		Anderson; 40.10°N 85.62°W	Madison	1930	290 acres (1.2 km^{2})	
O'Bannon Woods		Corydon; 38.18°N 86.29°W	Harrison	2004	2,000 acres (8.1 km^{2})	Formerly the Wyandotte SRA, renamed in honor of the late Indiana governor Frank O'Bannon.
Ouabache	—	Bluffton; 40.72°N 85.11°W	Wells	1962	1,104 acres (4.47 km^{2})	Name comes from the French spelling of "Wabash"
Pokagon		Angola; 41.71°N 85.02°W	Steuben	1925	1,260 acres (5.1 km^{2})	Well known for its toboggan run
Potato Creek	—	North Liberty; 41.55°N 86.34°W	St. Joseph	1969	3,840 acres (15.5 km^{2})	
Prophetstown		West Lafayette; 40.50°N 86.83°W	Tippecanoe	2004	2,000 acres (8.1 km^{2})	
Shades		Waveland; 39.93°N 87.08°W	Montgomery	1947	3,082 acres (12.47 km^{2})	Only state park to ever have its own airstrip
Shakamak		Jasonville; 39.17°N 87.24°W	Clay, Greene and Sullivan	1929	1,766 acres (7.15 km^{2})	Used to be a strip mine
Spring Mill		Mitchell; 38.73°N 86.42°W	Lawrence	1927	1,358 acres (5.50 km^{2})	Featured a pioneer village, numerous caves, and a memorial to Gus Grissom
Summit Lake		New Castle; 40.03°N 85.30°W	Henry	1988	2,680 acres (10.8 km^{2})	
Tippecanoe River		Winamac; 41.15°N 86.60°W	Pulaski	1943	2,761 acres (11.17 km^{2})	
Turkey Run		Marshall; 39.88°N 87.21°W	Parke	1916	2,382 acres (9.64 km^{2})	Famous for its sandstone gorges and unique terrain
Versailles		Versailles; 39.08°N 85.23°W	Ripley	1943	5,988 acres (24.23 km^{2})	
White River		Indianapolis; 39.77°N 86.17°W	Marion	1979	250 acres (1.0 km^{2})	An urban park in downtown Indianapolis
Whitewater Memorial		Liberty; 39.61°N 84.97°W	Union	1949	1,710 acres (6.9 km^{2})	Built on land donated by four counties

== See also ==
- List of Indiana state forests
- List of national parks of the United States
