= Richard Lieber =

German-American businessman (1869–1944)

- Born: September 5, 1869; Düsseldorf, Germany
- Died: April 15, 1944 (aged 74); McCormick's Creek State Park
- Occupation: Indiana State Parks Founder
- Known for: Conservationist

Richard Lieber (September 5, 1869 – April 15, 1944) was a German-American businessman who became the father of the Indiana state parks system. At his death, he could be considered the most powerful spokesman in the United States for the conservation of natural resources.

== Early life ==
He was born into privilege in Düsseldorf, Germany, in 1869. As a young child he was largely tutored, due to having an illness following a chest injury. He was also frequently in trouble due to his free-spirited nature. He spent time in London, England, following his graduation from secondary education, due to his parents' wanting him to learn the English language. While there he spent much of his time going to various museums and historical places; his liberal allowance from his parents meant plenty of time to learn English and do sightseeing. After his time in London, as two of his paternal uncles were living in Indianapolis, Indiana, he decided to go to the Hoosier state in 1891. This was with his parents' blessing: they feared he was gaining socialism's attitudes from his time in London after a Christmas trip back to Düsseldorf. His first job in America was working as a reporter for the Indiana Tribune, eventually marrying Emma Rappaport, the daughter of the owner. After the sale of the paper, he started his own personal businesses. Liking the freedom he felt in America, he publicly forsook his German citizenship.

It was after a tour of Yosemite National Park in 1900 that he became a proponent of conservation. This was further increased by a month and a six-week tour of the Rocky Mountains of Idaho and Montana. He went as a delegate to a White House conference about conservation by Theodore Roosevelt. After meeting Roosevelt, he started a series of articles promoting conservation. Indianapolis being the site of the Fourth National Conservation Congress, with Lieber as chairman, certified his status as a major figure for conservation. It was there that Lieber met Woodrow Wilson, and from there they formed a partnership for American conservation.

== Beginning state parks ==
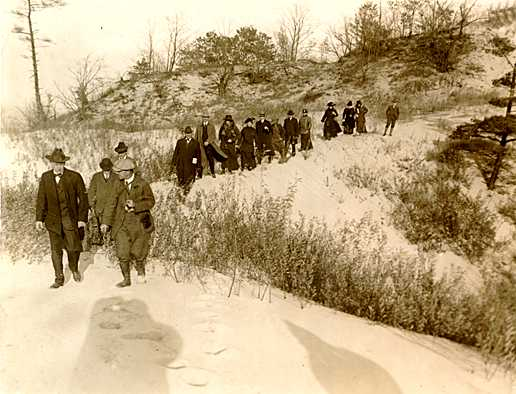
Lieber (front right) with NPS Director Stephen Mather at what would become Indiana Dunes State Park in 1916.

With the centennial of Indiana's statehood of 1916, Lieber thought that Indiana needed its own state parks like several other states. He encouraged Indiana Governor Samuel M. Ralston to start the State Parks Committee, with Lieber as chairman. With his twenty-man committee, he started acquiring parks, succeeding with McCormick's Creek and Turkey Run both opening on December 11, 1916, without any state funds (The Indianapolis Motor Speedway was a major private donor). In 1917, at the start of official American involvement in World War I, he was given the positions of Forestry Board secretary, Indiana State Parks Committee director, and Military Secretary to the Governor, and made a Colonel; he would forever be called "Colonel Lieber". These 1917 appointments were all done by governor James P. Goodrich. These were not easy decisions for the governor, due to World War I fueling anti-German sentiment in Indiana, and Lieber was not only German, but he had three brothers who were colonels in the German army.

Lieber convinced Goodrich, the new governor and close friend, to create a Department of Conservation to unite all the various state groups that were involved in various natural causes; the department was stopped from forming by the Democratic legislature in 1917, but the new Republican one of 1919 created it. As the Conservation Commission Chairman until 1933, he saw the creation of ten state parks and five state memorials. Little state money was used; Lieber had a knack for inspiring private citizens to obtain money to acquire park areas that would later be turned over for state park use. Attendance at Indiana state parks rose to 623,000 in 1932, up from 33,000 in 1919. In 1934, despite the lack of people and wealth compared to other states, it was rated as one of the three best state park systems by the National Park Service.

Lieber was increasingly asked to help in national endeavors. Indiana's park system, thanks to him, became a model for the rest of the United States. In 1921, Lieber and Stephen Mather organized the first nationwide gathering of state park workers, which met at Turkey Run.

Although a Republican, politics was never a pressing concern for him; he often turned down offers for jobs in Washington, D.C. But in 1933 the new Democratic governor, Paul V. McNutt, decided to dissolve the Conservation Commission, and effectively demoted Lieber to Division of State Parks and Lands and Waters Director; Lieber resigned in response on July 15, 1933. He would serve as an adviser to different sections of the National Park Service and led the National Conference on State Parks.

Lieber died in 1944 at the age of 74 while staying at McCormick's Creek's Canyon Inn. His ashes, along with those of his wife Emma, are buried at his beloved Turkey Run State Park.

== Legacy ==
Lieber stressed that it was important to charge gate fees for state parks, as it made its users value them more. To further increase parks being self-sufficient, he had various state parks build inns. Both were revolutionary ideas for their time. By 1942, the parks became economically self-sufficient. Also a nouveau approach was ensuring that each park had a "nature guiding program".

A quote from Lieber summarizes his beliefs: "Our parks and preserves are not mere picnicking places," he said. "They are rich storehouses of memories and reveries. They are guides and counsels to the weary and faltering in spirit. They are bearers of wonderful tales to him who will listen; a solace to the aged and an inspiration to the young."

He wrote a book entitled America's natural wealth: A story of the use and abuse of our resources in 1942, with several of his speeches also published. His widow would write a small-press book about him in 1947.
