= Outdoor Indiana =

- Frequency: Bimonthly
- First issue: 1934; 91 years ago
- Company: Indiana Department of Natural Resources
- Country: United States
- Based in: Indianapolis, Indiana
- Language: English
- Website: outdoorindiana.org
- ISSN: 0030-7068

Outdoor Indiana magazine, which debuted in 1934, is an outdoor magazine published by the Indiana Department of Natural Resources (DNR). It is published six times a year. Each issue spans 48 pages.

The magazine is produced by the state agency's Division of Communications. The editor in chief is the communications director. Most articles are written by DNR staff. The magazine is designed by artists in the Division of Communications. Except for occasional historical photos, all photography is full color. Almost all photographs are produced by two Indiana DNR photographers. Freelance writers and photographers are occasional contributors. The magazine does not include advertising.

The November–December issue includes a removable calendar featuring Indiana state photography and important outdoor events.
