= Indiana Department of Natural Resources Law Enforcement Division =

- Abbreviation: DNR

Agency overview
- Formed: 1897
- Preceding agencies: Office of Commissioner of Fisheries; Indiana County Road Supervisors; Department of Fisheries and Game

Jurisdictional structure
- Operations jurisdiction: Indiana, United States
- Area: 36,418 sq mi (94,321 km2)
- Population: 6,483,802 (2010)
- Legal jurisdiction: State of Indiana
- General nature: Civilian police

Operational structure
- Headquarters: Indianapolis, Indiana
- Sworn members: 214
- Agency executive: Colonel Dave Windsor
- Parent agency: Indiana Department of Natural Resources
- Districts: 10 law enforcement districts

Website
- http://www.in.gov/dnr/lawenfor/
- Data for organization as of May 2013.

The Indiana Department of Natural Resources Law Enforcement Division is the law enforcement division of the Indiana Department of Natural Resources, the fish and game regulatory agency of Indiana. The department has jurisdiction anywhere in the state and in state territorial waters. The division headquarters is located in Indianapolis and operates ten law enforcement districts in the state. The Law Enforcement Division employs 214 conservation officers. Indiana conservation officers not only enforce state laws, but teach outdoor education courses, conduct river rescue, cave rescue, underwater search and recovery, and have K-9 teams.

== History ==
In 1897, the Indiana General Assembly gave the Commissioner of Fisheries (the predecessor to the Indiana Department of Natural Resources) the authority to appoint at least one deputy in every Indiana county. In 1911, an act was passed establishing game wardens. The Law Enforcement Division is Indiana's oldest state law enforcement agency.

== Law enforcement districts ==
The ten law enforcement districts are:

=== District 1 ===
- District headquarters: Syracuse, Indiana
- Counties: Saint Joseph County, Elkhart County, Marshall County, Kosciusko County, Fulton County, Miami County, Wabash County

=== District 2 ===
- District headquarters: Columbia City, Indiana
- LaGrange County, Steuben County, Noble County, De Kalb County, Whitley County, Allen County, Huntington County, Wells County, Adams County

=== District 3 ===
- District headquarters: West Lafayette, Indiana
- Counties: Benton County, White County, Cass County, Warren County, Tippecanoe County, Carroll County, Fountain County, Montgomery County, Clinton County, Boone County

=== District 4 ===
- District headquarters: Anderson, Indiana
- Counties: Howard County, Grant County, Blackford County, Jay County, Tipton County, Madison County, Delaware County, Randolph County, Hamilton County, Henry County, Wayne County

=== District 5 ===
- District headquarters: Cloverdale, Indiana
- Counties: Vermillion County, Parke County, Putnam County, Vigo County, Clay County, Owen County, Sullivan County, Greene County

=== District 6 ===
- District headquarters: Nashville, Indiana; While the Law Enforcement Division headquarters is located in Indianapolis in Marion County, Central Dispatch is located in Bloomington in Monroe County.
- Counties: Hendricks County, Marion County, Hancock County, Morgan County, Johnson County, Shelby County, Monroe County, Brown County, Bartholomew County

=== District 7 ===
- District headquarters: Winslow, Indiana
- Counties: Knox County, Daviess County, Martin County, Gibson County, Pike County, Dubois County, Posey County, Vanderburgh County, Warrick County, Spencer County

=== District 8 ===
- District headquarters: Birdseye, Indiana
- Counties: Lawrence County, Jackson County, Orange County, Washington County, Scott County, Crawford County, Harrison County, Floyd County, Clark County, Perry County

=== District 9 ===
- District headquarters: Versailles, Indiana
- Counties: Rush County, Fayette County, Union County, Decatur County, Franklin County, Jennings County, Ripley County, Dearborn County, Jefferson County, Switzerland County, Ohio County

=== District 10 ===
- District headquarters: Michigan City, Indiana
- Counties: Lake County, Porter County, La Porte County, Newton County, Jasper County, Starke County, Pulaski County

== See also ==
- List of law enforcement agencies in Indiana
