= Indiana Department of Natural Resources =

State government agency in Indiana

Agency overview
- Formed: 1965
- Preceding agencies: Department of Conservation; Flood Control and Water Resources Commission; State Soil and Water Conservation Committee; Outdoor Recreation Council
- Jurisdiction: State of Indiana
- Headquarters: Indianapolis, Indiana
- Agency executive: Alan Morrison, Director
- Website: in.gov/dnr

The Indiana Department of Natural Resources (DNR) is the agency of the U.S. state of Indiana. There are many divisions within the DNR and each has a specific role. The DNR is not only responsible for maintaining resource areas but also manages Indiana's fish and wildlife, reclaims coal mine ground, manages forested areas, aids in the management of wildlife on private lands, enforces Indiana's conservation laws, and many other duties not named here. According to the department's website, their mission is "to protect, enhance, preserve, and wisely use natural, cultural, and recreational resources for the benefit of Indiana's citizens through professional leadership, management, and education".

== History ==
The Department of Natural Resources was created as part of the Natural Resources Act, passed by the Indiana General Assembly and signed into law by Governor Roger Branigin in 1965.

Four agencies were placed under the department's umbrella:

- Department of Conservation (the forerunner to the Department of Natural Resources)
- Flood Control and Water Resources Commission
- State Soil and Water Conservation Committee
- Outdoor Recreation Council

In 1967, the Nature Preserves Act established the Division of Nature Preserves, also under the same departmental oversight. Since then, the department has been involved in numerous initiatives and legislative efforts, including the establishment of new state parks, new flood laws, hunter safety programs, forestry education, and the general rejuvenation of Indiana's forestland. Today, the Department of Natural Resources claims that Indiana has 4.5 million acres (18,000 km^{2}) of forestland, still far from the area's original 23 million acres (93,000 km^{2}), but an improvement from the two million acres (8,000 km^{2}) that remained intact by 1900.

== Organization ==
At the top of the organization is the director (presently Alan Morrison), who reports directly to the Governor of Indiana. In addition to overseeing the department, the director also serves on an autonomous board known as the Natural Resources Commission, consisting of both government officials and citizen members, which meets at least four times annually to address issues pertaining to the department. The director also has an advisory council at his disposal.

Beneath the director, there are four deputy directors, each of whom is responsible for a team under which many of the department's divisions are organized. Those teams and their divisions are as follows:

- Regulatory Management Team
  - Water
  - Reclamation
  - Entomology & Plant Pathology
  - Historic Preservation & Archaeology
  - Oil and Gas
- Land Management Team
  - State Parks
  - Nature Preserves
  - Land Acquisition
  - Fish & Wildlife
  - Forestry
  - Engineering
- Administrative Management Team
  - Budget and Performance Management
  - Accounting
  - Human Resources
  - MIS
  - Purchasing
  - Strategic Management & Organizational Excellence
- Legal Team
  - Office of Legal Counsel

In addition, there are five departments that do not fall under one of the four teams:

- Legislative Affairs
- Communications
- Indiana Department of Natural Resources Law Enforcement Division
- Natural Resources Foundation
- Indiana Heritage Trust

The agency's official magazine is Outdoor Indiana.

== See also ==
- Indiana Department of Natural Resources Law Enforcement Division
- List of Indiana fish and wildlife areas
- List of Indiana state forests
- List of Indiana state lakes
- List of Indiana state parks
- List of state and territorial fish and wildlife management agencies in the United States
