= Miller Beach =

- Neighborhood
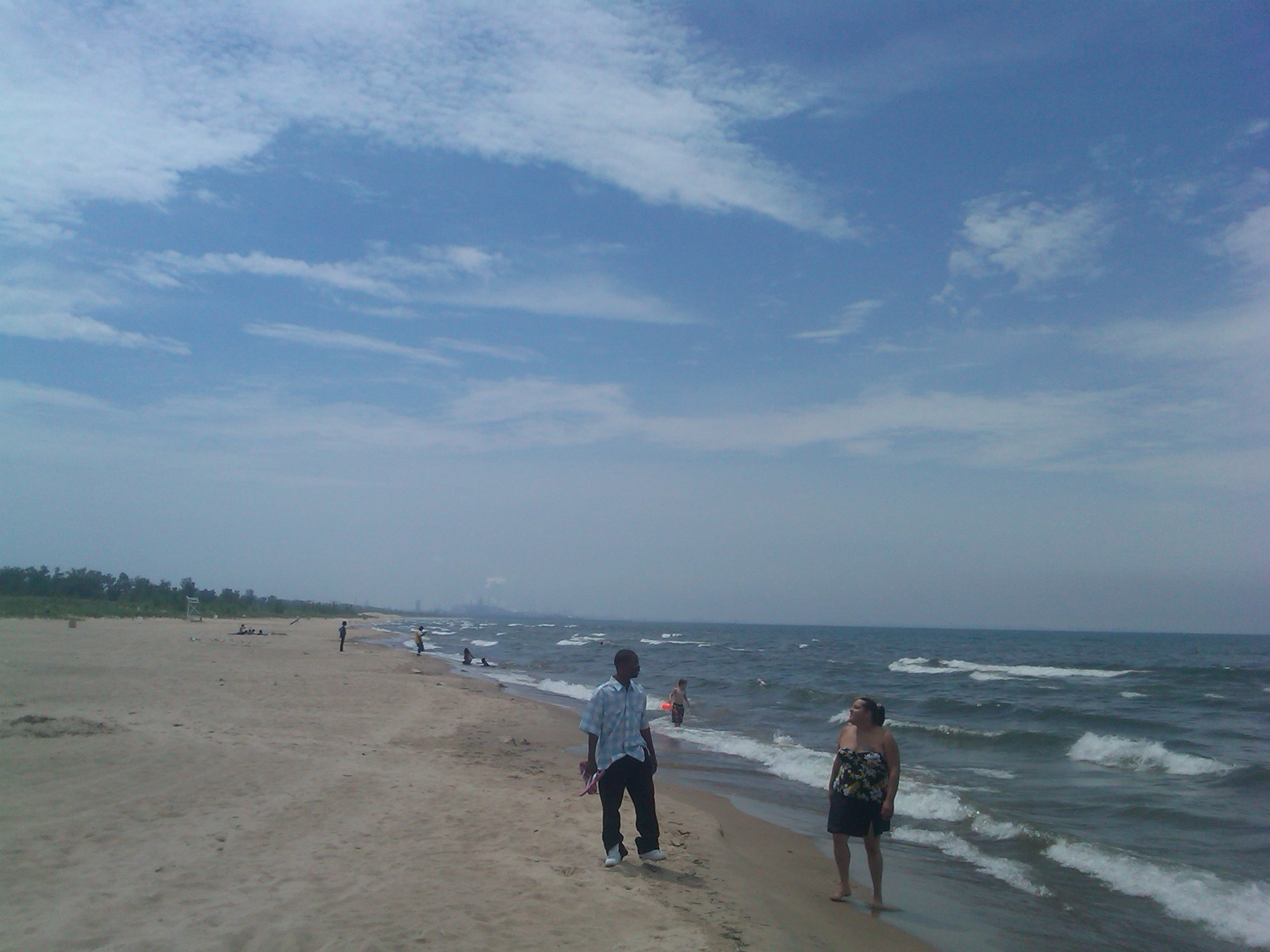
- The Lake Street Beach in Northwestern Miller Beach

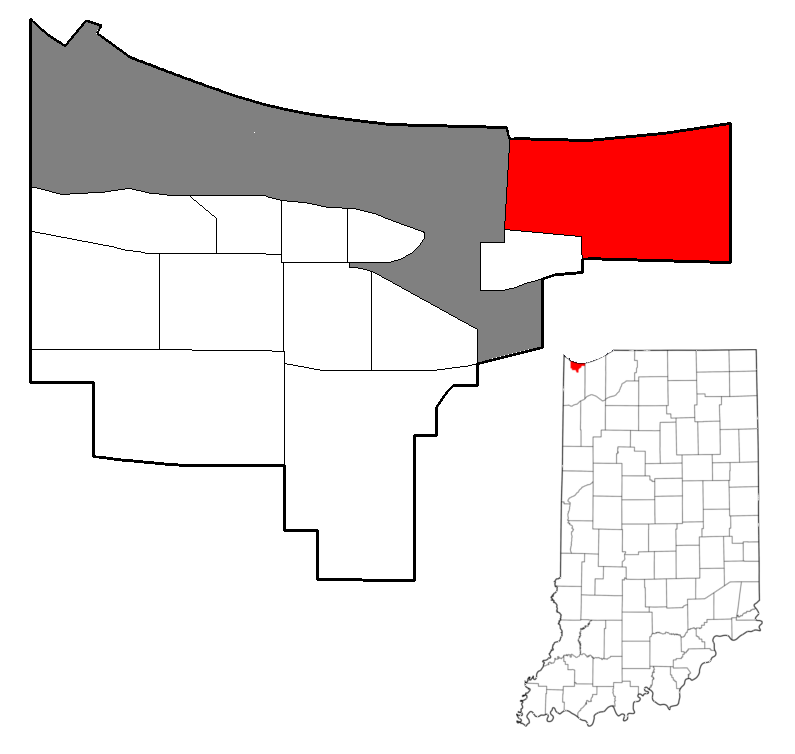
- Location within the city of Gary
- Coordinates (Miller Town Hall): 41.601°N 87.261°W
- Country: United States
- State: Indiana
- County: Lake County
- City: Gary
- First settled: 1851
- Incorporated: 1907
- Annexed by Gary: 1918

Area
  - Land: 15.17 km^{2} (5.86 sq mi)
  - Water: 4.45 km^{2} (1.72 sq mi)

Population (2000)
  - Total: 9,900
  - Density: 650/km^{2} (1,700/sq mi)
- Demonym: Millerite
- Time zone: UTC-6 (CST)
  - Summer (DST): UTC-5 (CDT)
- ZIP code: 46403
- Area code: 219

Miller Beach (also commonly known as Miller) is a neighborhood of Gary, Indiana on the southernmost shore of Lake Michigan. First settled in 1851, Miller Beach was originally an independent town. However, the "Town of Miller" was eventually annexed by the then flourishing city of Gary in 1918. Located in the northeastern corner of Lake County, Indiana, the town became known as "The Miller Beach Community." Miller Beach borders Lake Michigan to the north, Porter County to the east, and is largely surrounded by protected lands, including Indiana Dunes National Park. Miller Beach is also the closest beach/resort community to Chicago, and has been a popular vacation spot since the early 20th century. As of the 2000 US census, it had a population of 9,900.

Home to some of the world's most threatened ecosystems, Miller Beach contains a high proportion of legally protected land. Miller encompasses the westernmost part of Indiana Dunes National Park, which is part of the United States National Park system, and includes both the Miller Woods and Long Lake areas. Indiana Dunes' West Beach area lies immediately to the east of Miller Beach. The entire shoreline of Miller is public beachfront. Miller's large lakefront park, Marquette Park, is a national landmark containing architecturally significant and historic structures, two bronze sculptures and the location of early failed experiments in aviation which predate the Wright Brothers flights. Less than an hour from downtown Chicago by car, Miller Beach has attracted Chicagoans as tourists and residents for more than a century. The most affluent area within the municipal boundaries of Gary, Miller Beach contains multiple business districts, including the Miller Beach Arts and Creative District, a robust civil society, and numerous public and charter schools. The community is within a mile of exits on four major interstates, and is also served by South Shore Line commuter trains. Having defied regional trends toward racial polarization and environmental degradation, Miller Beach exhibits extraordinary socioeconomic, racial and bio diversity. The community has been described as "an island of integration and natural beauty".

== Geography ==
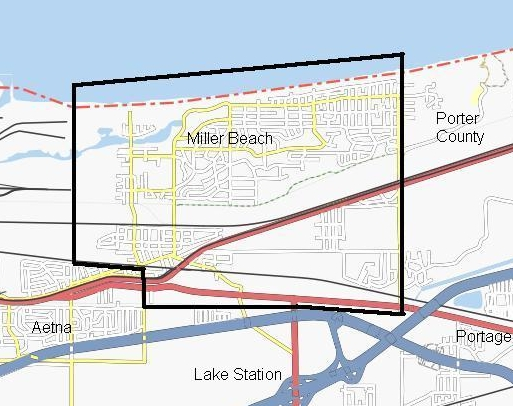
Map of Miller Beach and environs, showing the neighborhood's approximate boundary as defined by the City of Gary

Miller Beach sits at Lake Michigan's southern tip, and at the northeastern tip of Lake County. The majority of Gary's lakefront is occupied by heavy industry, Miller Beach is the only residential area within Gary's municipal boundaries with unspoiled lake frontage. The shoreline of Miller is publicly owned either by the municipal or federal governments, and beachfront homes are separated from the lake by "an apron of dunes".

Protected lands separate Miller Beach from most of its neighbors, except for the smaller Gary neighborhood of Aetna to the southwest. To the west, the Miller Woods area of Indiana Dunes National Park lies between Miller and U.S. Steel's Gary Works. To the east, Miller borders on the Park's West Beach area. To the southeast and south, the Little Calumet River corridor largely separates Miller from the cities of Portage and Lake Station. Although mostly in private hands, the land along the Little Calumet is largely protected from development by flood-control easements. In addition, a strip of National Park property separates Miller's northern and southern halves, making the northern half of Miller Beach one of four beachfront communities entirely surrounded by the National Park.

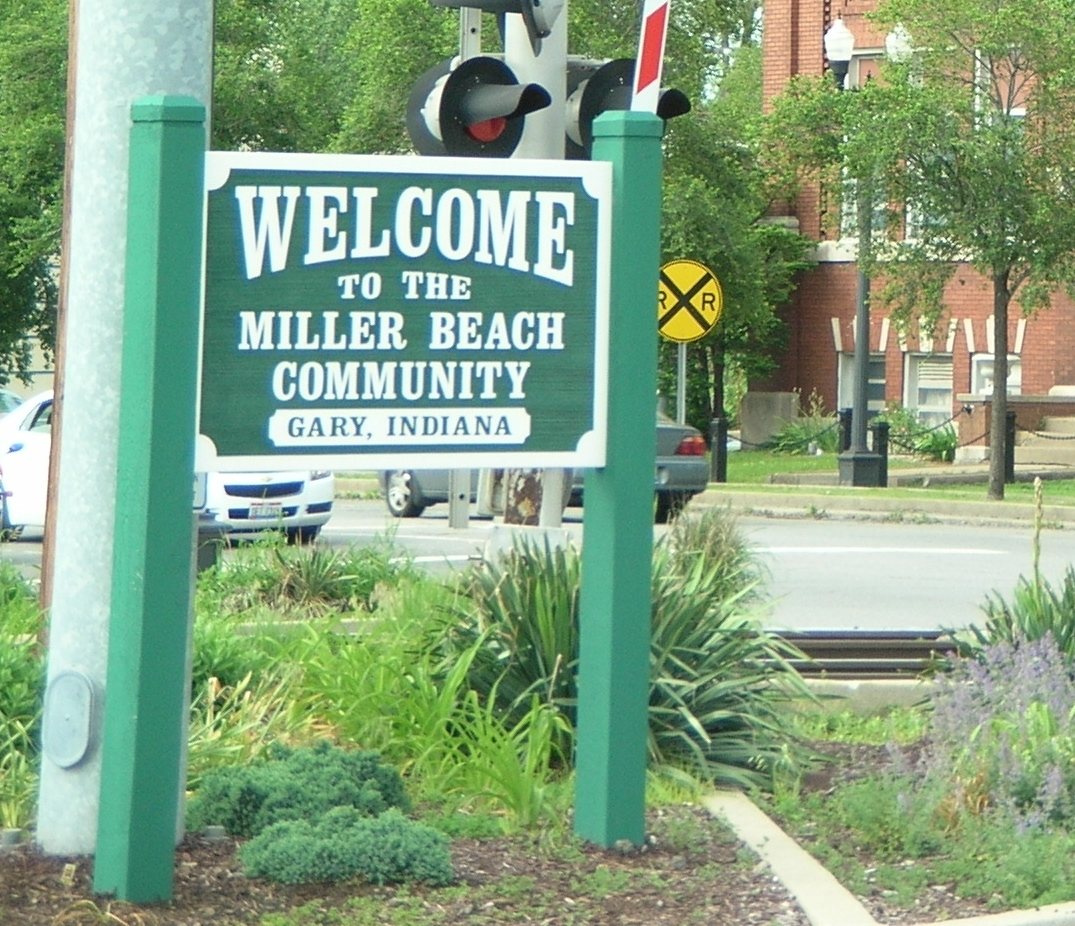
Sign next to Miller Station, welcoming visitors to Miller Beach

As a legacy of the cycles of expansion it has undergone since the 19th century, Miller Beach contains a number of distinct neighborhoods. Miller's traditional core, The Grandlake Historic District, between Lake Street and Grand Boulevard, is home to Miller's oldest homes and civil structures, many built during the period of Miller's political independence such as Miller Town Hall and Miller School. The northern part of Miller Beach is chiefly residential and surrounded entirely by national parkland. At the far northeast corner, along County Line Road, Miller's most expensive development, East Edge, rubs shoulders with the Miller Village apartment complex.

West of Miller's downtown is another multi-block apartment complex, Duneland Village, containing a small baseball park, the 3.47-acre Gibson Fields, home field of Miller Little League for generations. In the opposite direction, more than a mile to the east of downtown on the Dunes Highway, the isolated Inland Manor subdivision lies in the midst of Indiana Dunes National Park. All property in Inland Manor has been acquired by the US government to become part of the National Park, however many residents remain in their homes under reservation of use and occupancy agreements.

== History ==
=== Early history ===
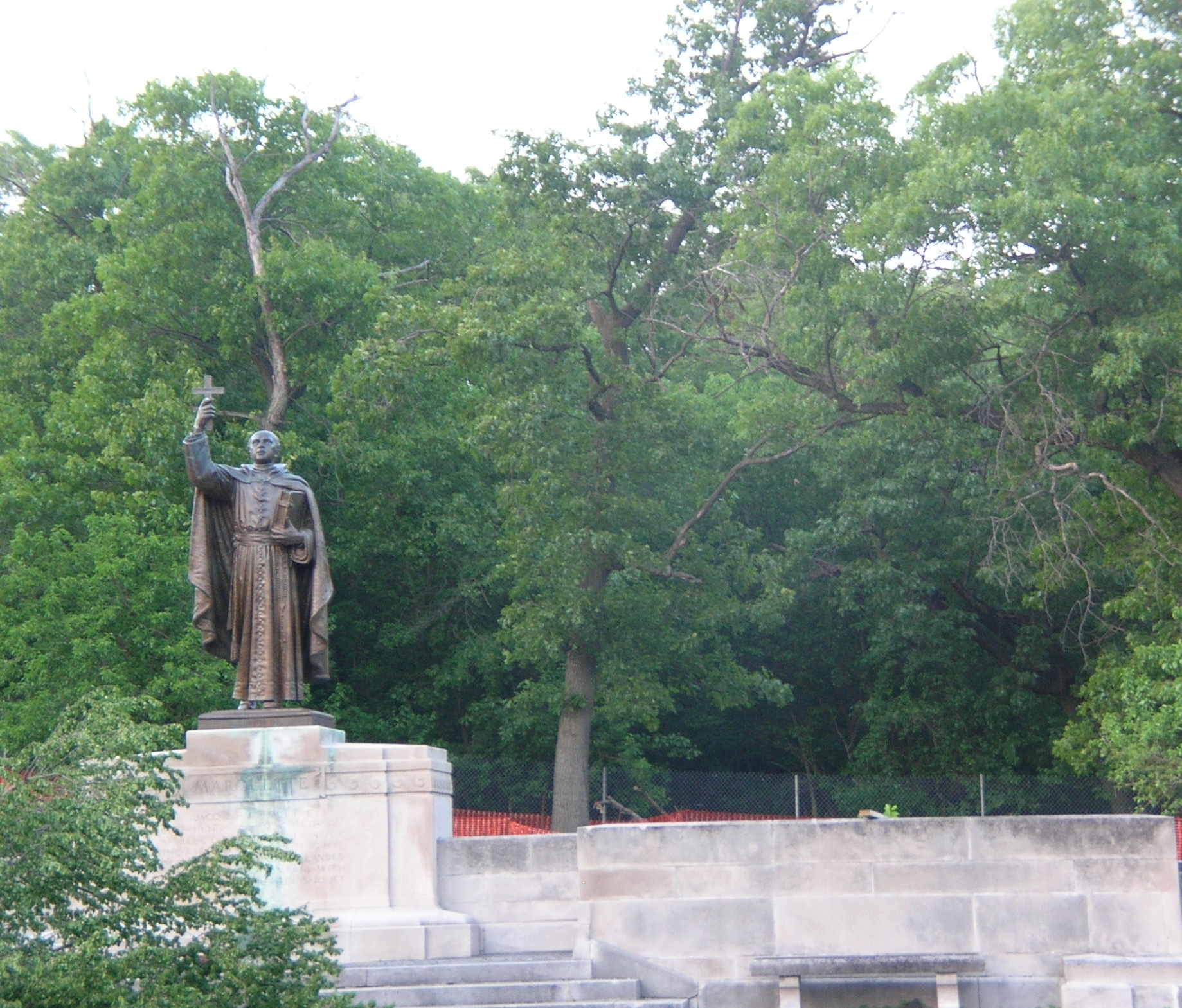
Statue of Father Marquette at the entrance to Marquette Park. Sculpted by Henry Hering, the statue was installed in 1931.

When Lake Michigan first entered recorded history in the early 1600s, the land at the lake's southern end was populated by the Miami people. By 1640, the Miami had been driven from the region by the Beaver Wars. The Potawatomi moved in from the north to replace them. The Potawatomi frequently came into the areas now within the Indiana Dunes National lakeshore to hunt, fish and gather food including wild rice. The Odawa people also hunted deer there in the winter.

French missionary Father Jacques Marquette passed along the south shore of Lake Michigan in 1675, attempting to return to Canada after he had fallen gravely ill on the Mississippi River. According to local tradition, Marquette camped for a night at the mouth of the Grand Calumet River in present-day Marquette Park, shortly before his death.

As the United States expanded westward in the early 19th century, the Potawatomi were removed from Indiana through a series of treaties and forced removals in the 1820s and 1830s. Indian Boundary Road in Miller Beach marks the border of a tract ceded in one such treaty, the 1826 Treaty of Mississinewas, which used the southern end of Lake Michigan as the tract's southern limit. By 1836, the Potawatomi nation had been deprived of all of its lands throughout Indiana. Some Potawatomi, however, remained in the Miller Beach area as landowners, including Simon Pokagon, second chief of the Pokagon Band. Other Potawatomi continued to visit the region in the spring and summer into the late 19th century.

As white settlement spread across the Upper Midwest in the 19th century, many promoters and speculators sought to attract settlers and commercial development to the Calumet Region, but were defeated by the difficult terrain and lack of transportation. In 1833, an inn called the Bennett Tavern was built at the mouth of the Grand Calumet River, serving the Detroit-Chicago stagecoaches that ran along the shoreline. It stood for only a few years. The first man to plat a town in modern-day Miller Beach was Indian trader Joseph Bailly, who in 1833 platted a "Town of Bailly" at the mouth of the Grand Calumet, in present-day Marquette Park. But nothing came of the Town of Bailly or the "Indiana City" laid out nearby in 1837.

In 1837, the area that would become downtown Miller was purchased and platted by Indian traders William and George Ewing and George H. Walker. The plat bore the name of "Ewing's Subdivision", as the lots within it still do. Development in Ewing's Subdivision took off when the railroad arrived in 1851.

=== Town of Miller ===
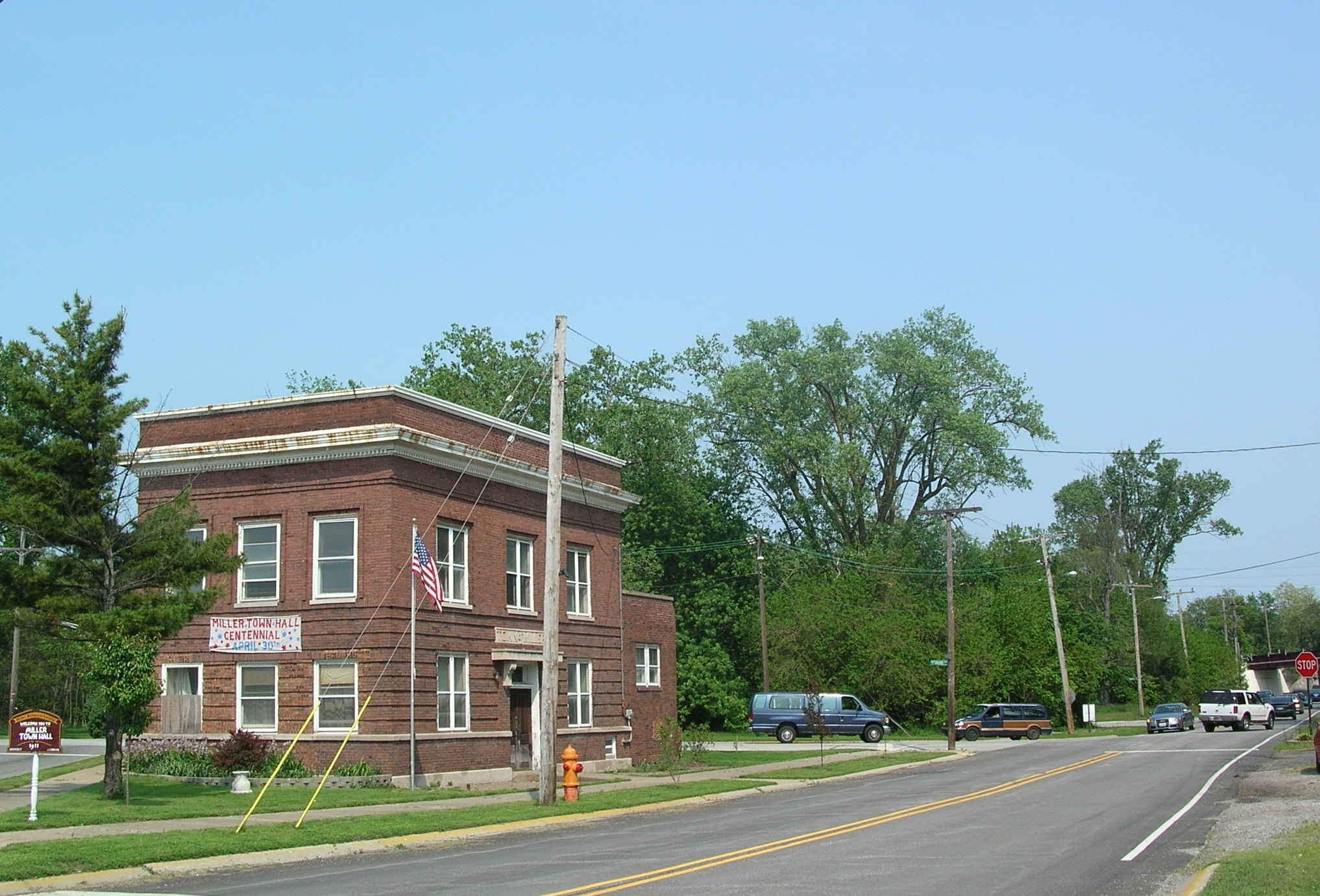
The Miller Town Hall, built in 1911. After Miller's annexation, the structure was used as a firehouse.

With the coming of the Lake Shore and Michigan Southern Railway in 1851, a train stop first called "Miller's Station" and later "Miller's Junction" or "Miller's", and ultimately "Miller", was established in the present-day downtown area of Miller Beach. A railroad town from its inception, Miller would later also be served by the B&O Railroad beginning in 1874 and the South Shore Line beginning in 1908. The person for whom the town was named is unknown. An early railroad agent recalled the name as coming from a construction engineer named John Miller who lived in the area, and at whose home the early trains would stop for water and wood between LaPorte and Chicago. Other possible namesakes include an innkeeper for whom train crews dropped off milk, and a foreman who buried his son nearby.

Swedes began to migrate to the United States in large numbers in the 1860s as a result of the famines in Scandinavia, and some of these immigrants settled in Miller. The Swedish- and German-Americans of early Miller drew their livelihood from sand mining, ice harvesting, and railroad maintenance. Miller remained very small in this period; only twelve families were present in 1870. Miller acquired its first schoolhouse in the 1860s, and its own post office in 1879. Beginning in the 1880s, the town hosted a small commercial sturgeon and whitefish fishery, with fishermen bringing in sturgeon weighing as much as 200 pounds.

The combination of proximity to Chicago and a pristine natural environment soon drew visitors from the city. Among them was aviation pioneer Octave Chanute, who staged a series of experimental flights from the 70-foot dunes near Lake Street Beach in 1896. Around the same time, the pioneering botanist Henry Chandler Cowles conducted early studies of ecological succession in Miller Woods. In subsequent decades, the Chicago film industry used the Miller dunes and beaches as backdrops in numerous silent films set in exotic locales. Among these were films by the Selig Polyscope Company, and the Chicago Essanay Studios productions The Plum Tree (1914) and The Fall of Montezuma (1912), in which the Miller beach represented the coast of Mexico.

Millerites rallied to incorporate their community as the Town of Miller in 1907, hoping to prevent annexation by Gary following the founding of that then booming city in 1906. Gary mayor Thomas Knotts first attempted to annex Miller in 1910 as part of a larger territorial dispute with East Chicago. According to the 1910 census, at that time the Town of Miller had a population of 638 people. This initial annexation effort was successfully resisted.

In the 1910s, the Gary city government and US Steel became increasingly aware of the need for a lakefront park for the millworkers and their families. In view of this, Miller and Gary formed a joint parks department in 1915 to administer part of the land that is now Marquette Park. Encountering difficulties purchasing this land, however, Gary sought to annex Miller so that it could seize the property by eminent domain. In 1918, the town board voted to accept annexation, ending Miller's political independence.

=== Part of Gary ===
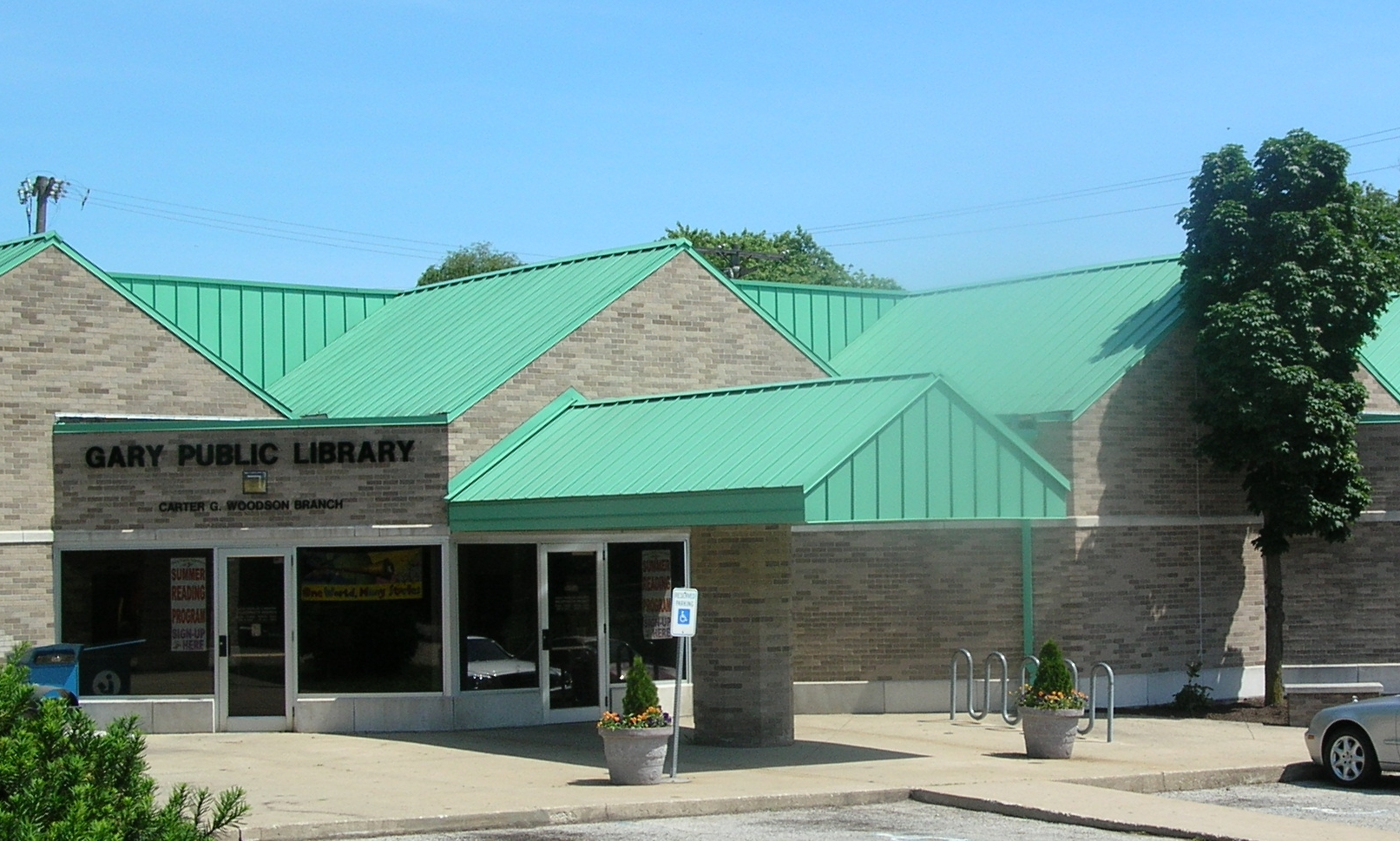
The Woodson branch of the Gary Public Library, in downtown Miller Beach. The branch dates to 1913, although the current building was constructed in 1991.

After its annexation, the community continued to grow. So did its tourist industry: Drusilla Carr, proprietress of Carr's Beach (now Lake Street Beach), collected rent on more than a hundred beach cottages. With attractions including a shooting gallery, bath house, miniature railroad and "night spots", Carr's Beach was Gary's most popular summer destination in the late 1920s. With the construction and expansion of Marquette Park in the 1930s, and an influx of affluent residents from other parts of Gary in the late 1940s, the neighborhood became increasingly a resort community. It also became a segregated white community, with African-Americans banned from the beaches, and also from the neighborhood except for day workers.

In 1967, Richard Hatcher was elected mayor of Gary, becoming the first African-American mayor of any major US city. The voting in his election was almost entirely along racial lines, with white Democrats voting en masse for the Republican candidate in the general election. A key exception to this was in Miller Beach, where Hatcher obtained decisive support from a group of primarily Jewish Millerites who would oppose the Wallace presidential campaign in 1968 and had subsequently supported Hatcher in his bid for the Gary Common Council.

Fearing that the white flight occurring elsewhere in Gary would be replicated in Miller Beach, local residents formed the Miller Citizens Corporation (MCC) in 1971. Unlike similar groups elsewhere in the city, the goal of the MCC was not to prevent integration, but to slow the process so that events did not spiral out of control. The MCC worked to stem flight from the community with techniques including positive publicity about Miller's advantages, and banning "For Sale" signs. As part of this effort, the organization also took on environmental issues, including banning sand mining in residential areas.

The National Lakeshore was founded in 1966 through the efforts of Senator Paul Douglas, ending a struggle that had begun in the 1890s. The Lakeshore's initial boundaries, however, did not include the Miller Woods and Long Lake areas in Miller Beach. After the death of Senator Douglas in 1976, a Lakeshore expansion bill gained bipartisan support in Congress, as a memorial to him. With the bill's passage, the Lakeshore was expanded by 4,300 acres, including Miller Woods and Long Lake.

In 2002, faced with plummeting property tax revenue due to a state-imposed change in assessments of industrial property, the city of Gary nearly doubled tax rates, leading to widespread outcry. Together with other organizations around the state, the Miller Citizens Corporation lobbied successive state governments to impose tax caps. The tax caps became law in 2008, and became part of the state constitution in 2010.

=== Demographics ===
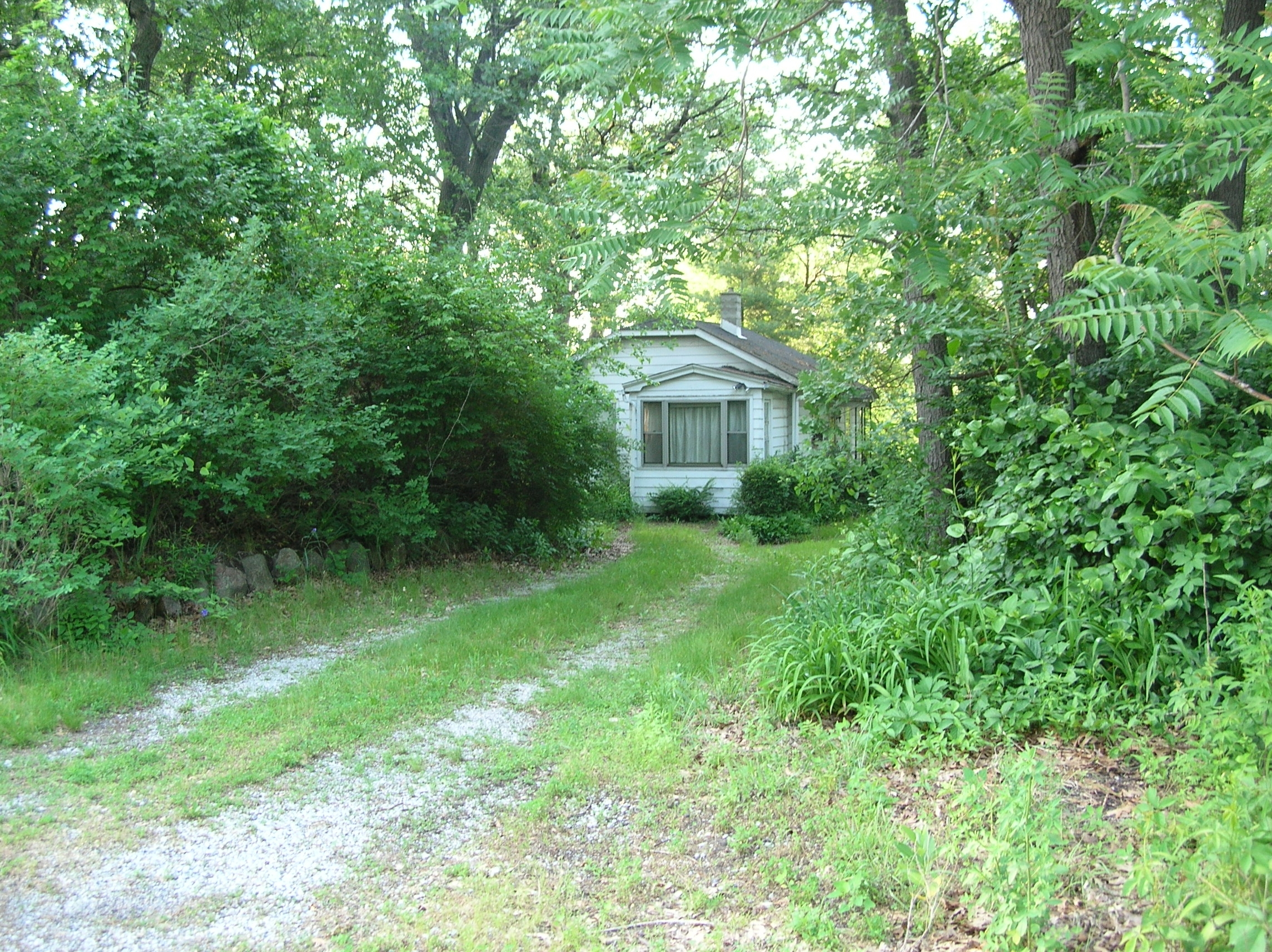
House in Miller Beach occupied by Nelson Algren in the 1950s. Simone de Beauvoir described it as "a ravishing little house hidden in the trees".

Miller Beach began as a working-class town with a primarily Swedish-American and German-American population. The neighborhood's demographic makeup became wealthier and more diverse beginning in the late 1940s as it attracted affluent residents from elsewhere. In 1950, Miller supplanted the Horace Mann neighborhood as Gary's wealthiest area, a distinction it has retained ever since. Along with other areas on Gary's periphery, Miller saw strong 70% growth during the 1950s. During this period, Miller Beach developed a sizable Jewish population.

The first house in Miller Beach to be purchased by an African-American family was sold in 1964. Unlike other Gary neighborhoods that saw abrupt white flight and economic dislocation during this period, Miller Beach underwent a stable and peaceful transition through the 1970s to an integrated population with most of the new African-American residents being "upwardly mobile" black professionals. Miller Beach and the previously little-developed Westside neighborhood were the only areas in Gary to experience population growth during the 1970s.

Since early in the community's history, many people have moved to Miller Beach from nearby Chicago, "seeking a getaway from the city". Early examples included nonconformist Alice Mabel Gray, known as "Diana of the Dunes", who frequented Miller Beach and nearby Ogden Dunes in the early 1900s. In the 1950s, as it gained prominence as a resort area. Miller's many new residents included author Nelson Algren, who bought a house on the East Lagoon with the proceeds from the Pulitzer Prize and The Man With the Golden Arm. Another wave of migration from Chicago began in the 1990s. The live and let live style of Miller Beach has also attracted numerous lesbian and gay families to the community over the years- both as part-time and full-time residents.

== Natural environment ==
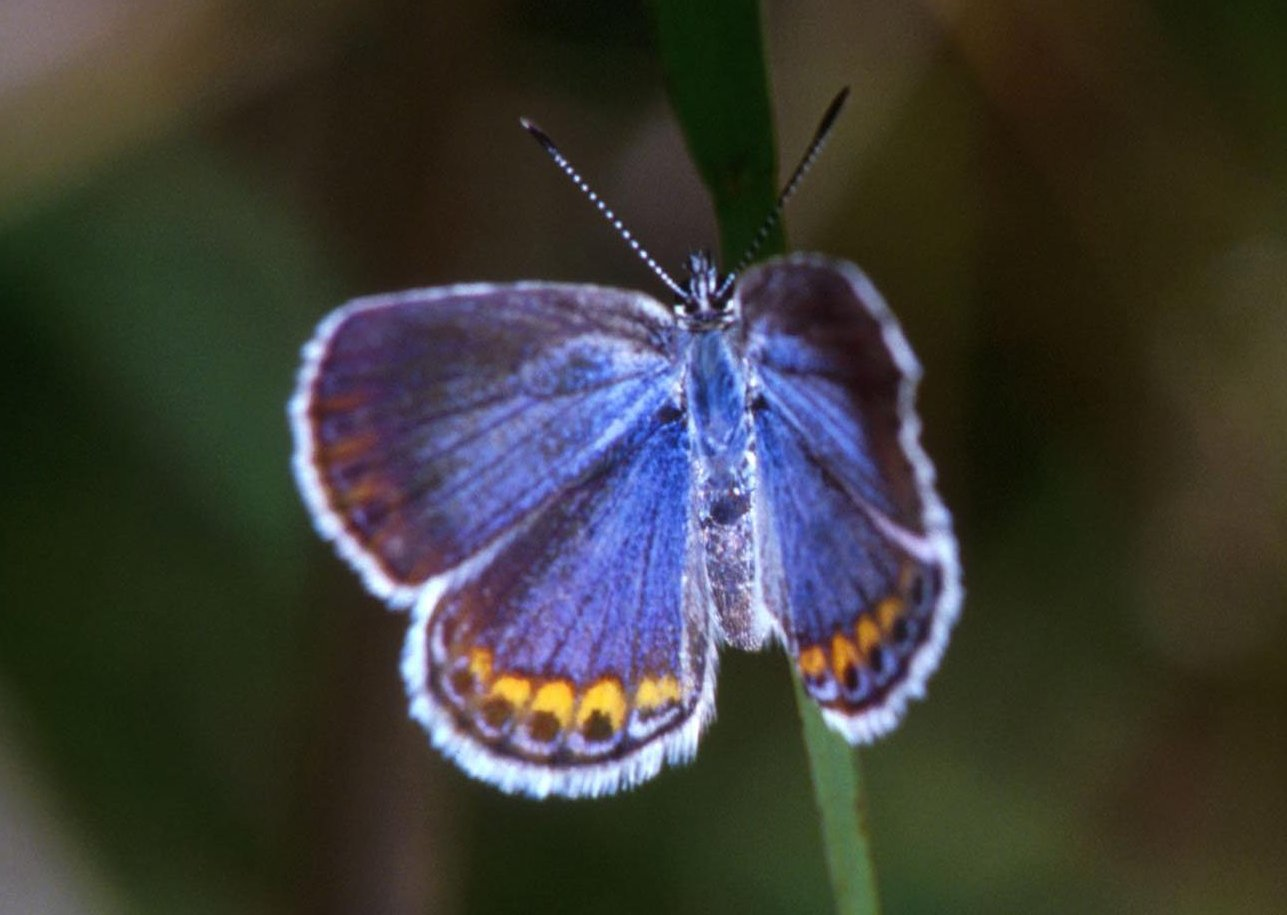
The Karner Blue, an endangered species of butterfly which makes its home in the rare dune-and-swale habitat in Miller Woods

The natural landscape of Miller Beach includes "some of the most pristine habitats that remain in Northwest Indiana". The freshwater panne habitat, found at Miller Woods and West Beach, is considered globally imperiled by the Nature Conservancy. The dune and swale complex is unique to the southern Great Lakes, with only a few isolated pockets remaining. Sand oak savanna, of which Miller Woods provides "one of the finest in the Chicago region", is both globally and state imperiled.

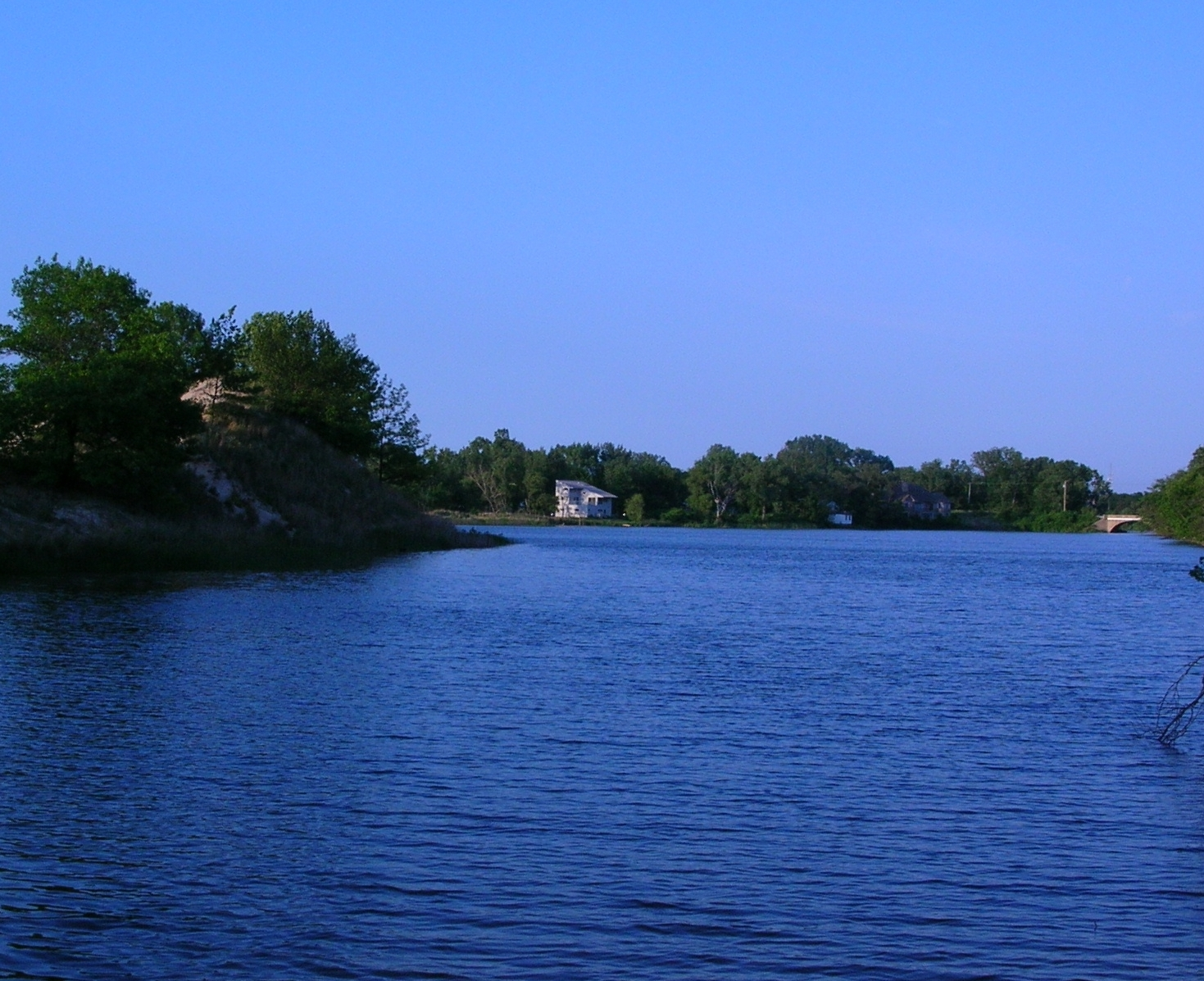
The middle of the three Grand Calumet Lagoons in Miller Beach. The lagoons mark the former mouth and modern-day headwaters of the Grand Calumet River.

This varied landscape of dunes and wetlands is the legacy of fluctuations in Lake Michigan and the Grand Calumet River since the last ice age. The Wisconsinan glaciation ended in the Miller Beach area around 18,000 years ago, forming Glacial Lake Chicago as the glaciers melted. Some boreal species remained in hospitable habitats after the climate had warmed, while more heat-tolerant species such as the six-lined racerunner and prickly pear cactus moved in during the Holocene climatic optimum to inhabit the mesic uplands.

After the glaciers retreated, factors including isostatic rebound of the earth's crust led to a series of different lake levels, each of which left a mark on the landscape. During the Algonquin stage, the dune-and-swale ridges of the Tolleston Beach were formed across much of the Calumet Region, including the southern part of Miller Beach. The later and lower Nipissing stage created the high dunes that mark the northern, lakeward part of Miller Beach. Around 2600 BP, the Grand Calumet River formed; prior to the 19th century, it emptied into Lake Michigan at Marquette Park in Miller Beach, where the Grand Calumet Lagoons are today. The direction of the Grand Calumet was changed in 1862. Because the river is nearly flat, however, the direction of flow through the lagoons sometimes reverses after heavy rains.

=== Flora and fauna ===
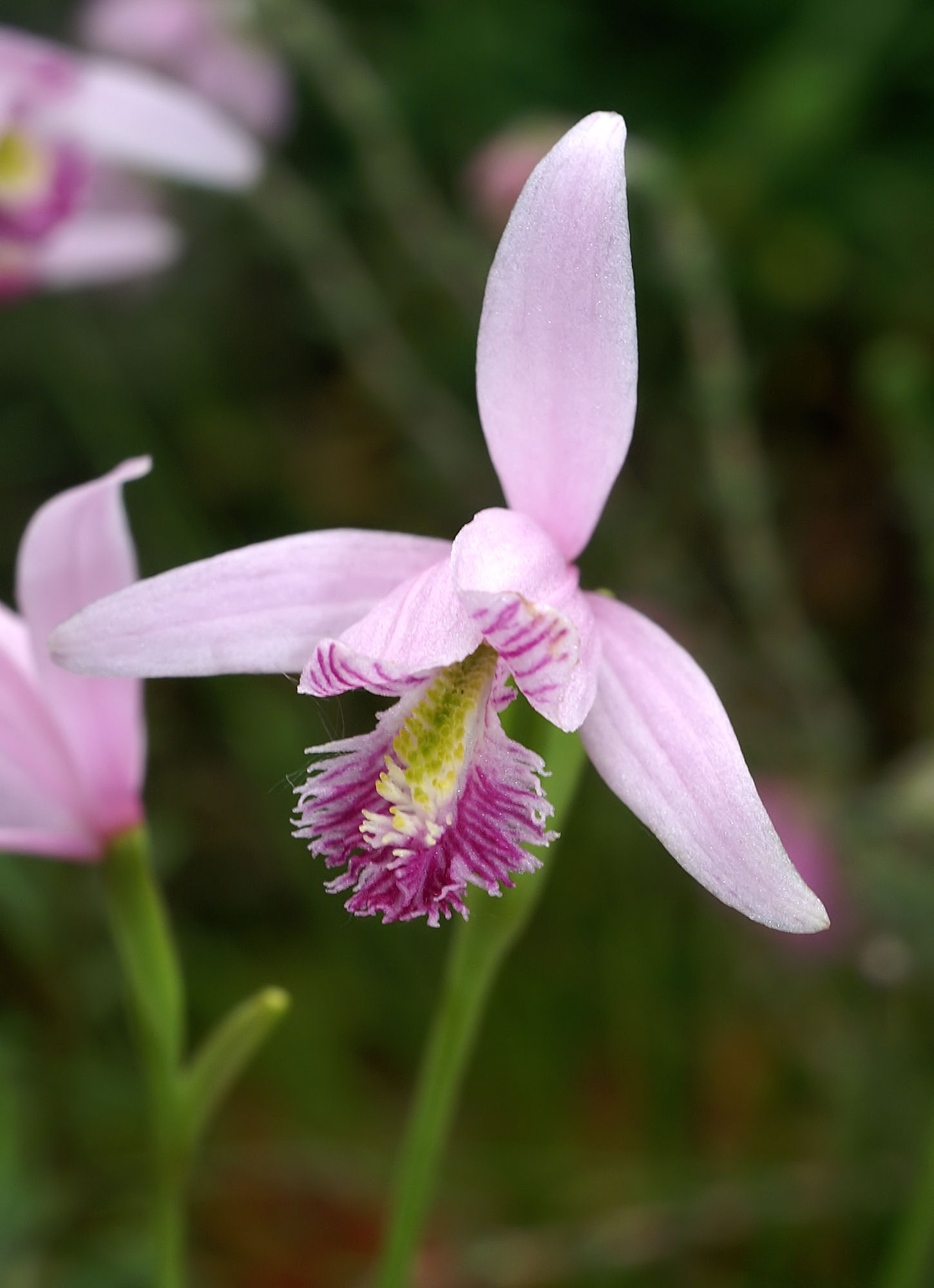
A snake-mouth orchid, Pogonia ophioglossoides. This orchid grows in the foredunes of Miller Woods.

Indiana Dunes National Park, which includes large areas in and around Miller Beach, is a place of extremely high biodiversity. The neighborhood's Miller Woods area alone is home to 287 species of plants and animals, including the federally endangered Karner Blue butterfly and the federally threatened Pitcher's thistle.

At 1,445 plant species, the Park has more species per unit of area than any other national park in the United States. Among these, numerous species of orchids are found in the neighborhood's Miller Woods area, including the Northern fringed orchid and snake-mouth orchid. Some plant species found in Miller Woods, such as the fame flower, grow nowhere else in the Indiana Dunes.

A wide range of species of wild mammals inhabit the natural areas of Miller Beach, including the Virginia opossum, prairie deer mouse, fox squirrel, and beaver. The coyote, which returned to the area in the 1990s, is the region's largest wild predator, and the white-tailed deer is its largest herbivore. Although no definitive survey of local bats has been conducted, several species are believed to be present in the area, including the endangered Indiana myotis.

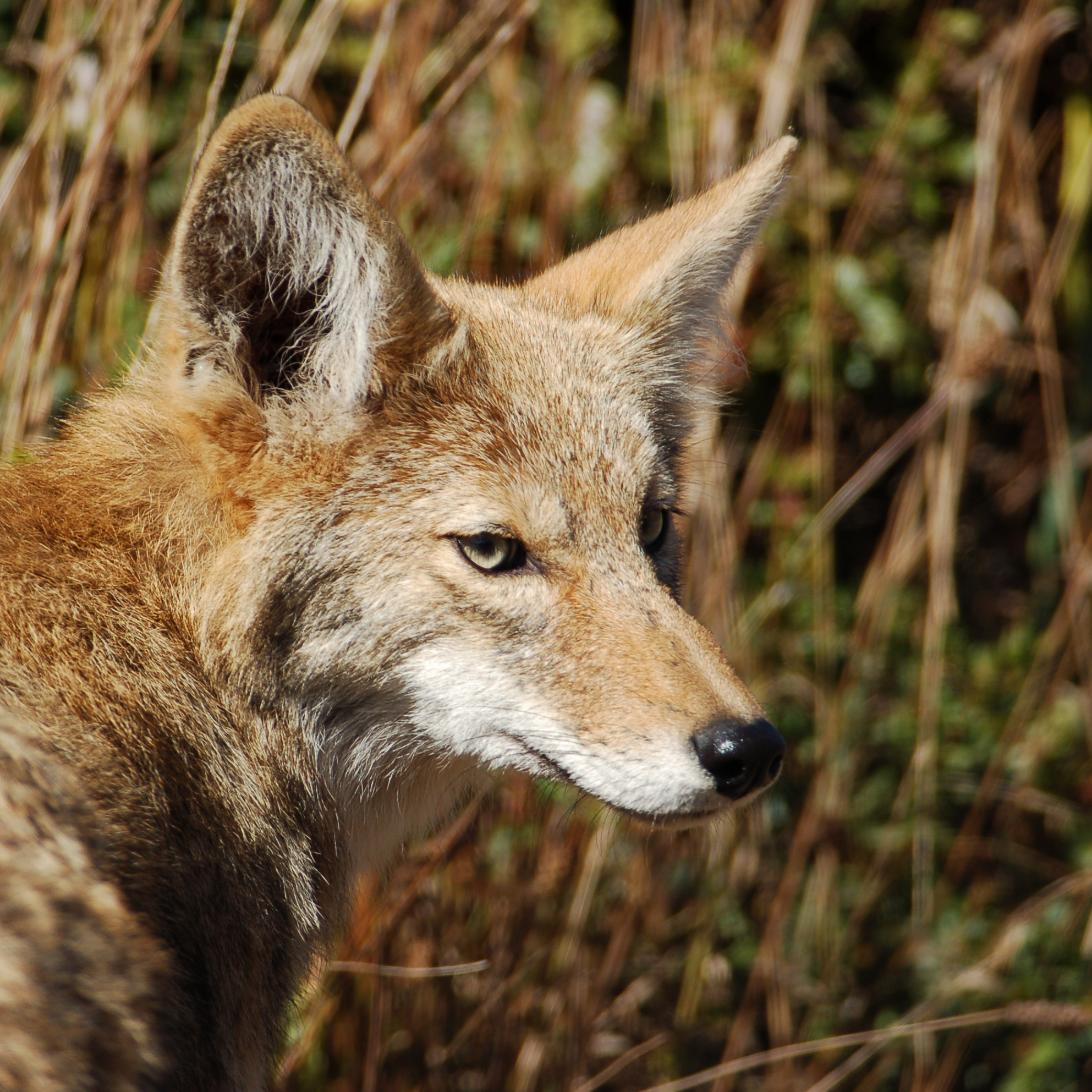
A coyote. The coyote began to reestablish itself in the Indiana Dunes in the 1990s.

Miller Beach and the adjacent West Beach area of the National Park provide a stopping point for many migratory birds, thanks to their position at the southernmost tip of Lake Michigan. The Audubon Society has consequently designated both areas as Important Bird Areas. In particular, the neighborhood's beachfront is known as one of the best areas in the Midwest for observing jaegers during their autumn migration, and also lies under a spring flyway of the sandhill crane. Migrant birds stopping at Long Lake include the state-endangered least bittern and Virginia rail.

Miller Woods is home to 18 species of reptiles and amphibians, giving it one of the most diverse herpetofauna in the Indiana Dunes. These include the Fowler's toad, the six-lined racerunner and the state-endangered Blanding's turtle. In addition, the slender glass lizard inhabits the Inland Marsh area in the neighborhood's southeast.

== Society ==
"Where else could you catch salmon or trout in the morning, be in easy access to your metropolitan office, attend a major league game in the afternoon, and still enjoy a dinner with the family in a home near the big water or nestled in the wooded dunes?"

— Fred Grady, "Message of Miller", 1973

The Miller Citizens Corporation (MCC) has played a key role in Miller Beach politics and society since its foundation in 1971. Founded to help prevent white flight and disruption during the sudden changes of the 1970s, the MCC quickly expanded into other ways of promoting community stability, including through environmental preservation and zoning ordinances. In the 21st century, the MCC has also been active in addressing city fees and taxation issues.

Other major civic organizations in the neighborhood include the Humane Society of Northwest Indiana and Crisis Center. Located in Miller Beach since 1988, Crisis Center provides crisis intervention and suicide prevention services to teens and adults nationwide.

Miller Beach has had a vibrant religious life dating back to 1874, when the Swedish-speaking Bethel Lutheran church was organized, meeting originally in the Miller schoolhouse. The town's first English-speaking church, Chapel of the Dunes, was built in 1901. Miller is unusual among communities in the region, in that both of these early churches are still standing. The Roman Catholic parish of St. Mary of the Lake was established in 1929, under the Gary diocese. Miller Beach is also home to Gary's only synagogue still in operation, Temple Israel, a Reform congregation founded in 1910.

The Miller Garden Club, founded in 2000, hosts an annual garden walk and plant sale. Miller also hosts several community gardens, one of which is a joint project between Miller's Lutheran and Jewish congregations.

Numerous festivals are held in Miller through the year, including the South Shore Air Show at Marquette Park. The biweekly farmer's market also functions as a sort of community fair, with information booths from groups such as the Miller Historical Society. In 2011, Miller was the site of the only gay pride parade in Northwest Indiana. Called "Northwest Indiana Rainbow Days," the annual parade has been held in Gary since 2006.

Miller Beach is part of the First District of the Gary Common Council,. Residents additionally vote for three at-large council seats.

== Economy ==
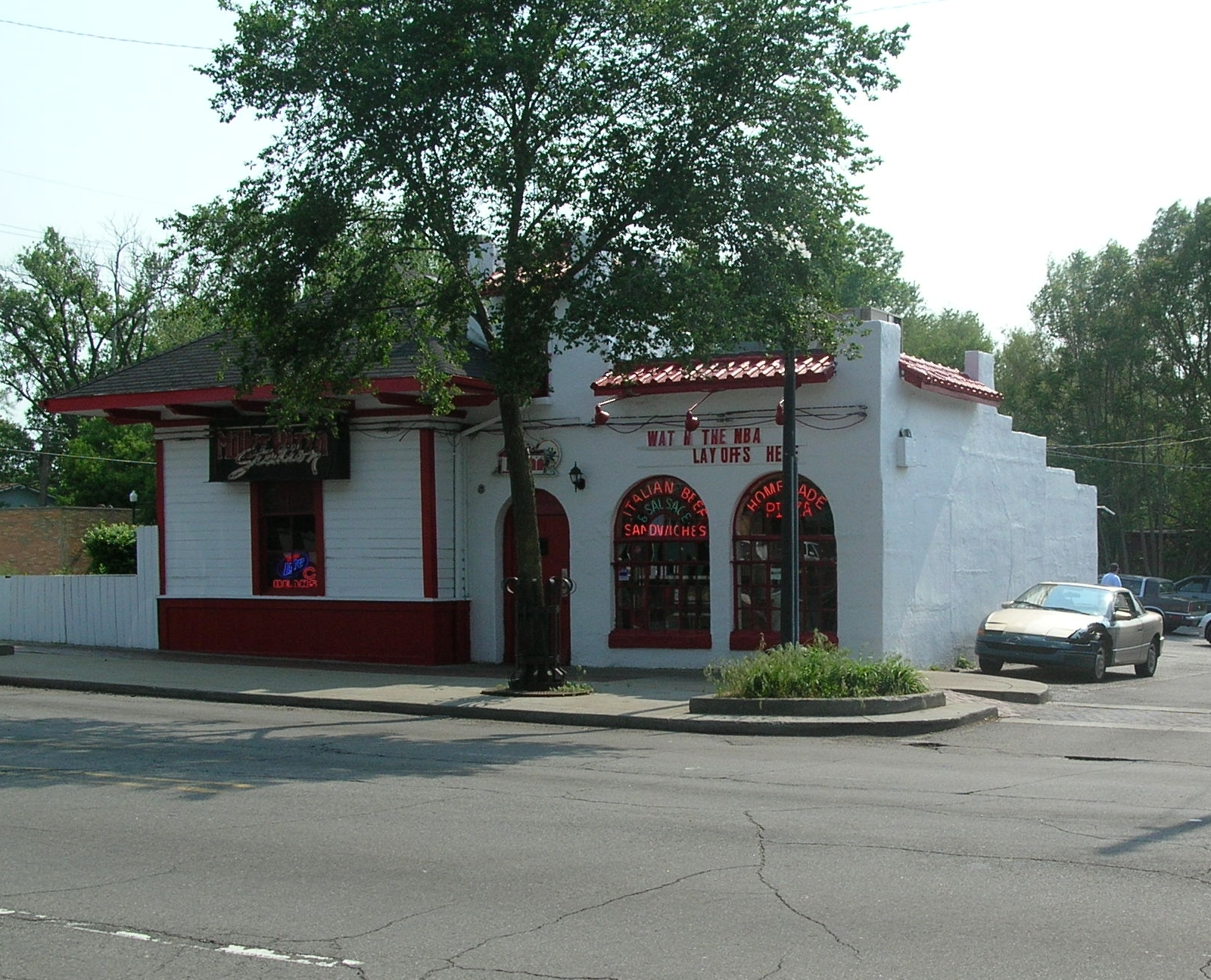
The Miller Pizza Company, located in a remodeled train depot

The economy of Miller Beach is dominated by retail and tourism, with no heavy industry. Because of its relatively affluent population and scenic lakefront setting, Miller Beach is also able to attract luxury high-end housing development. Many Miller homeowners commute to work in Chicago or have their primary residence in Chicago and a vacation or weekend home in Miller Beach.

Home values in Miller are the highest of any area within the municipal boundaries of Gary. In 2006, a home on Miller's lakefront sold for more than US$1 million for the first time. As of 2008, the "East Edge" development in northeastern Miller Beach was the city's most expensive, with single-family home prices in excess of $500,000. As of 2000, Miller's 4,773 housing units had an owner-occupancy rate of 47.4% and a vacancy rate of 10.3%.

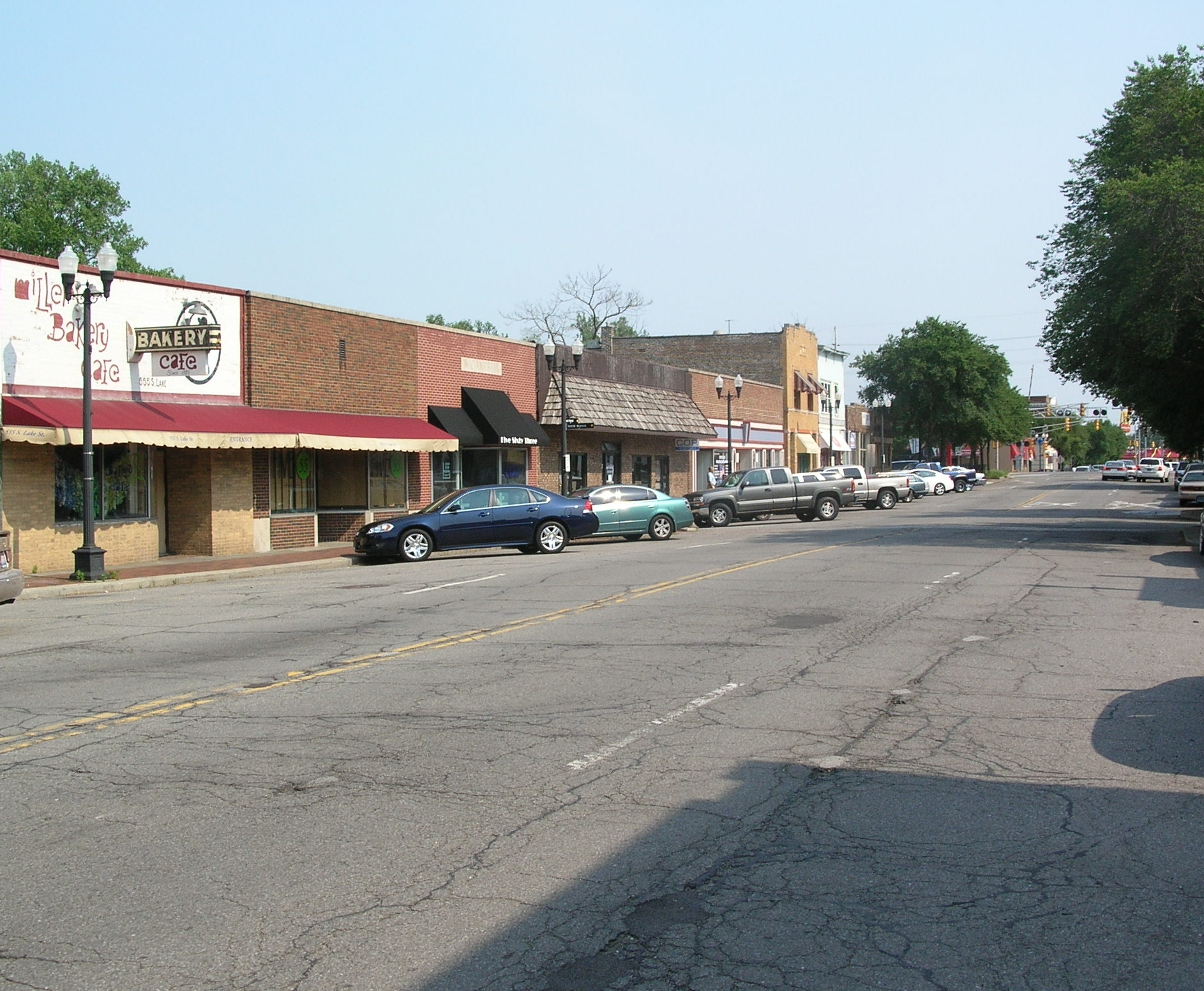
The downtown business district of Miller Beach

Commercial activity in Miller Beach is clustered primarily along Lake Street and U.S. 20, in the neighborhood's southwestern corner. The Lake Street corridor is a traditional downtown area, described by the city government as having a "pedestrian-friendly, 'Main Street' character." The downtown area has the highest walkability of any part of Miller Beach. Most retail catering to neighborhood residents is concentrated along this corridor. Near the southern end of downtown, the historic Miller Train Station was relocated just a few yards from its original location and is now the main dining room for Miller Pizza Station, a popular restaurant in the downtown area.

The U.S. 20 corridor, running along Miller's southern end and partially shared with the Aetna neighborhood, is another commercial center. Businesses along U.S. 20 cater primarily to highway and interstate travelers. This corridor is also home to several strip clubs, a source of frequent anger from community activists.

During the summer months, the Miller Beach Farmers' Market provides an alternative source of fresh food. Begun in 2008 and now sponsored by the Miller Beach Arts and Creative District, the Farmers' Market seeks to promote a sustainable local economy and allow residents access to high-quality, fresh produce and gourmet foodstuffs.

== Education ==
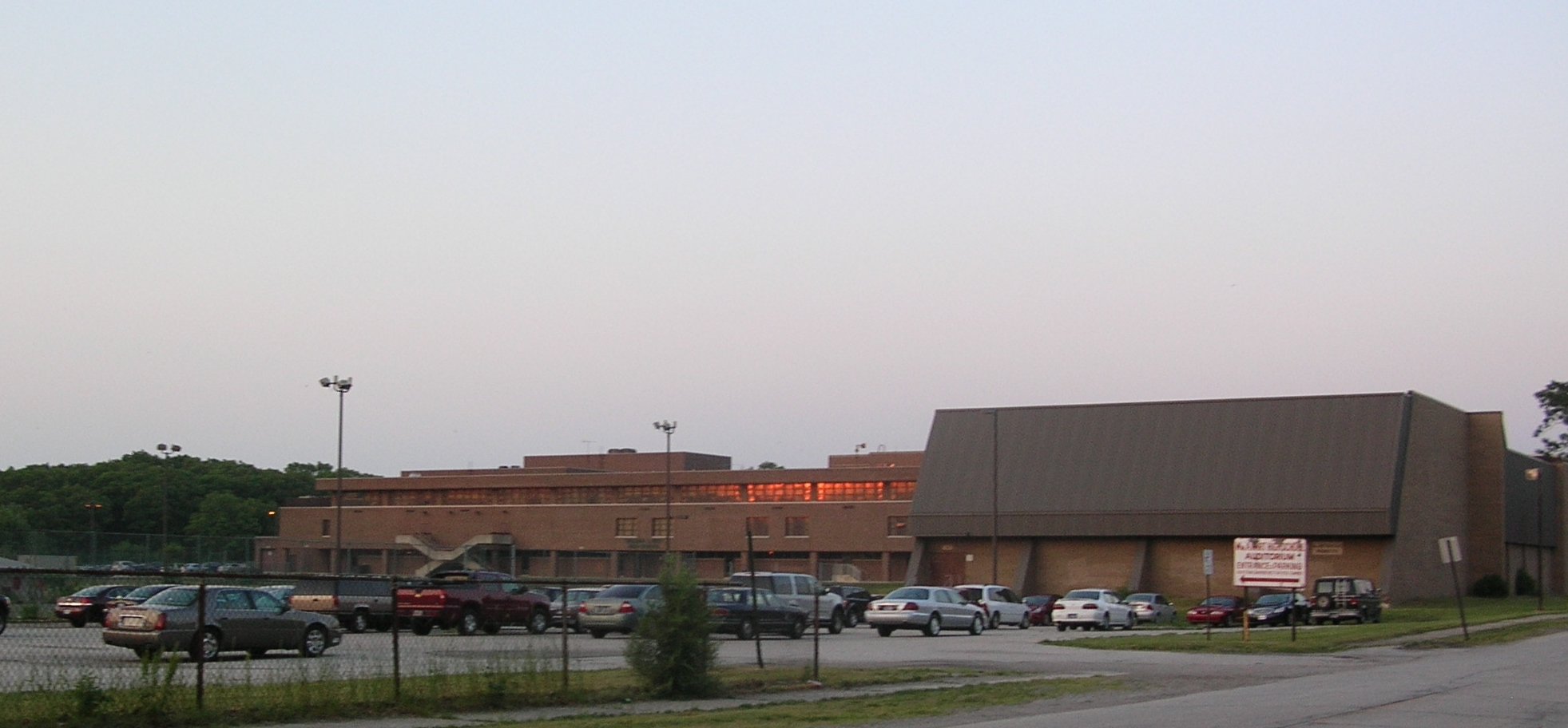
Wirt Emerson, a magnet school for the visual and performing arts, located in Miller Beach

Public schooling in Miller Beach, is provided by the Gary Community School Corporation. Public elementary schools in Miller include Marquette Elementary, near Marquette Park, and Banneker Elementary near Long Lake. The public high school for the area is West Side Leadership Academy in Gary.

Charter schools in Miller Beach include KIPP: Lead College Prep Charter School and the Charter School of the Dunes, located adjacent to the Lake Street Beach. Like all charter schools in Gary, these schools are sponsored by Ball State University. At the neighborhood's edge, a private religious school is operated by Christ Baptist Church in the Glen Ryan area; another private school is located in Aetna. The Miller Beach area is also served by the Roman Catholic schools of the Gary diocese. As of 2011, there were no Catholic schools in Miller Beach, although the local parish did operate a K-8 institution, Saint Mary of The Lake School, from 1949 to 1993.

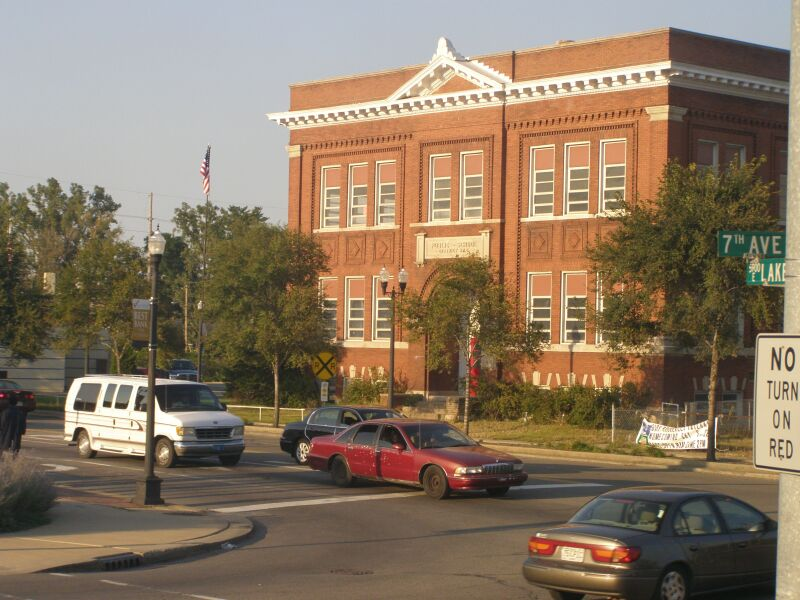
The South Shore Centre for the Arts in downtown Miller Beach. The building was constructed in 1910 as the Miller School.

Nearby institutions of higher learning include Indiana University Northwest in Gary's Glen Park neighborhood, Purdue University Northwest in Hammond, and Valparaiso University in Valparaiso. There are no colleges or universities within Miller Beach itself. The 2005-2009 American Community Survey found that approximately 28% of Miller Beach residents had a bachelor's degree or higher.

Additional community education facilities include the Paul Douglas Center for Environmental Education in Miller Woods, which provides environmental education to residents and visitors. Numerous scheduled lectures, classes and workshops are held there each year. The trails around the Douglas Center additionally provide a self-guided nature tour.

Downtown Miller Beach is home to the South Shore Centre for the Arts, located in the building once occupied by the Miller School. The Centre provides classes for the general public on subjects including dance, piano, voice, and self-defense. The Centre is also home to the South Shore Dance Alliance, a "pre-professional" contemporary dance company drawing members from throughout Northwest Indiana and performing throughout the Chicago area.

== Transportation ==
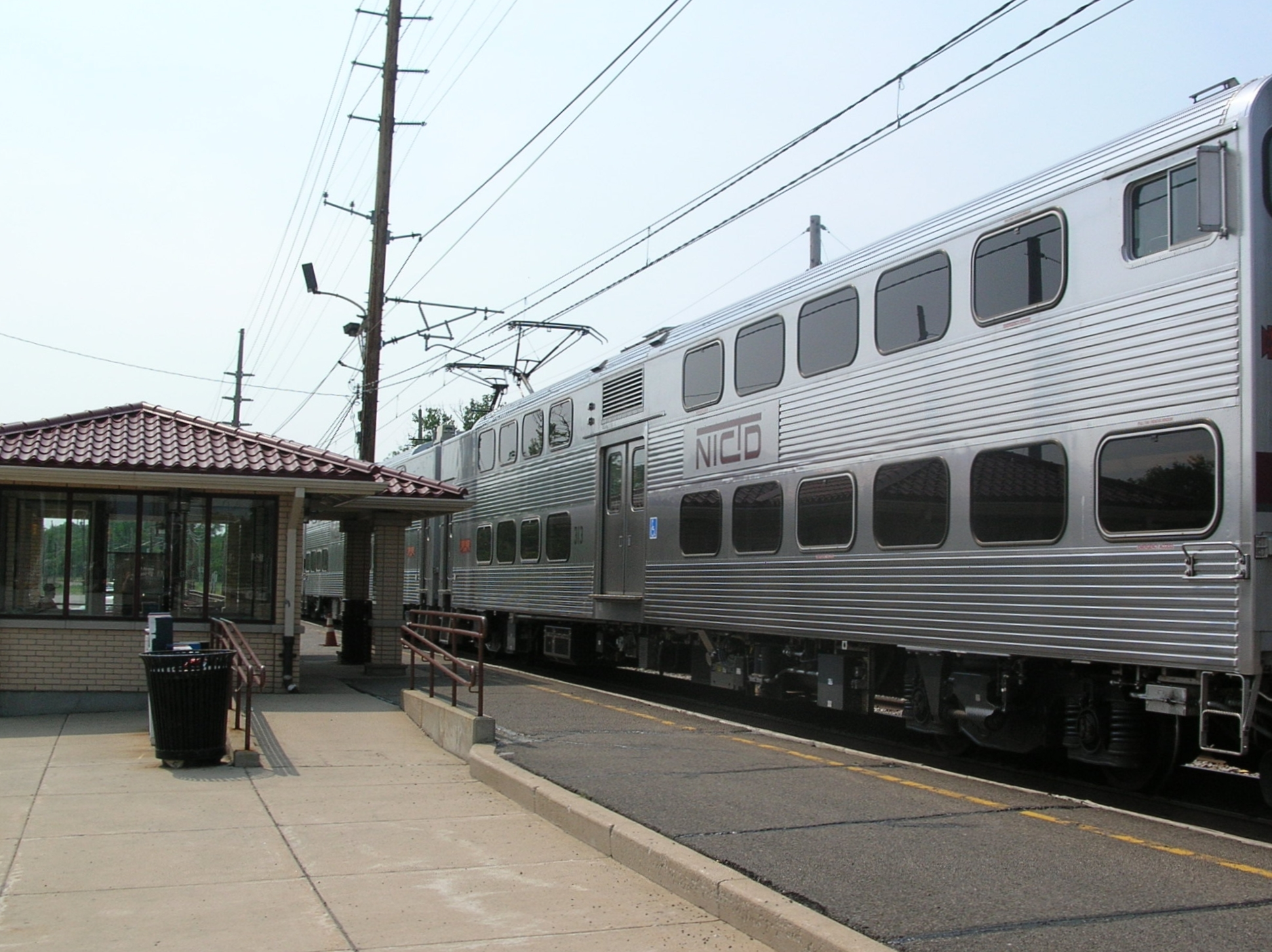
NICTD South Shore Line train at Miller Station

Miller Beach lies near the nexus of four major interstates: 65, 80, 90, and 94, although none of them pass directly through the neighborhood. Interstate 65 reaches its northern terminus just to the west of Miller. Joined as the Borman Expressway, Interstates 80 and 94 have exits just southwest and south of Miller, at Interstate 65 and at Indiana State Road 51 in Lake Station. The Indiana Toll Road (Interstate 90) shares both the Borman's exit at State Road 51, and the Interstate 65 exit. Using the Toll Road, Miller Beach is 36 miles from downtown Chicago, with an estimated travel time of 50 minutes.

Surface highways traversing Miller Beach include U.S. 12, the earliest highway to serve the area. U.S. 20 also passes along the community's southern edge. Highways 12 and 20 connect Miller to the interstates, downtown Gary, and nearby towns of Porter County such as Portage and Chesterton. Additionally, Indiana State Road 51 has its northern terminus at U.S. 20, at Miller's the southern limit, and connect Miller Beach to communities south of the Little Calumet River, such as Lake Station and Hobart.

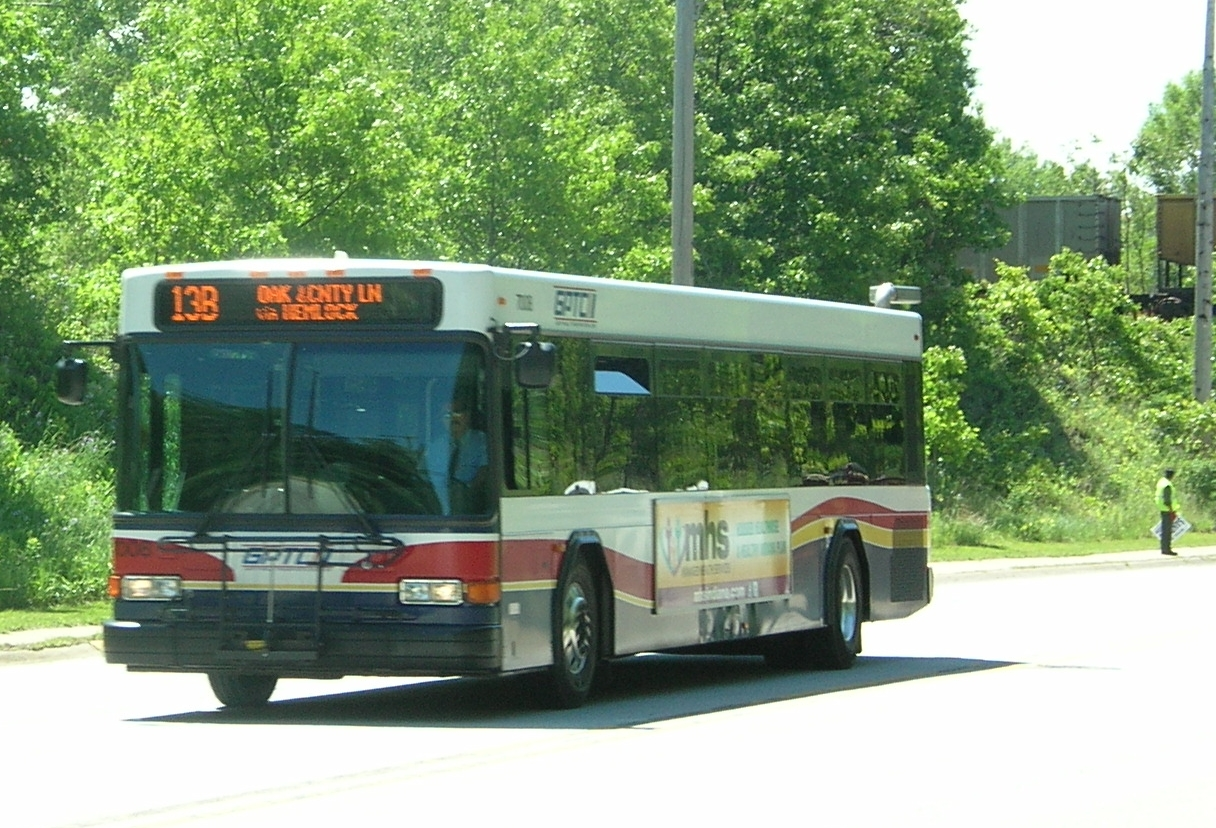
GPTC bus with bike rack, passing through the Indiana Dunes National Lakeshore in Miller Beach

The all-electric commuter trains of the NICTD South Shore Line stop at Miller Station. On weekdays, Miller Station is served by 14 eastbound trains and 12 westbound trains. The South Shore Line has served the neighborhood since 1908, when the line was built as an interurban railroad by tycoon Samuel Insull.

Miller Beach is served by the Route 13 buses of the Gary Public Transportation Corporation (GPTC), which do a full circle of the neighborhood and terminate at the GPTC hub station at Gary Metro Center in downtown Gary. At the Metro Center, passengers can transfer to buses serving other parts of Gary and towns as distant as Hammond and Crown Point. The Metro Center is also served by Greyhound buses, and is the eastern terminus for many South Shore Line trains.

A 2.0-mile bicycle trail, the Marquette Greenway, runs through National Lakeshore property from downtown Miller Beach to West Beach in Porter County. Paved with fine limestone, as of 2010, the Marquette Greenway was one of only two bicycle trails within Gary. The Gary Green Links plan calls for additional trails and bikeways connecting Miller Beach to other towns and neighborhoods. As of 2011, however, the 46403 ZIP code, which chiefly encompasses Miller Beach and Aetna, has a mean Walk Score of 30 out of 100, tied for the lowest walkability in Gary.

== Landmarks ==
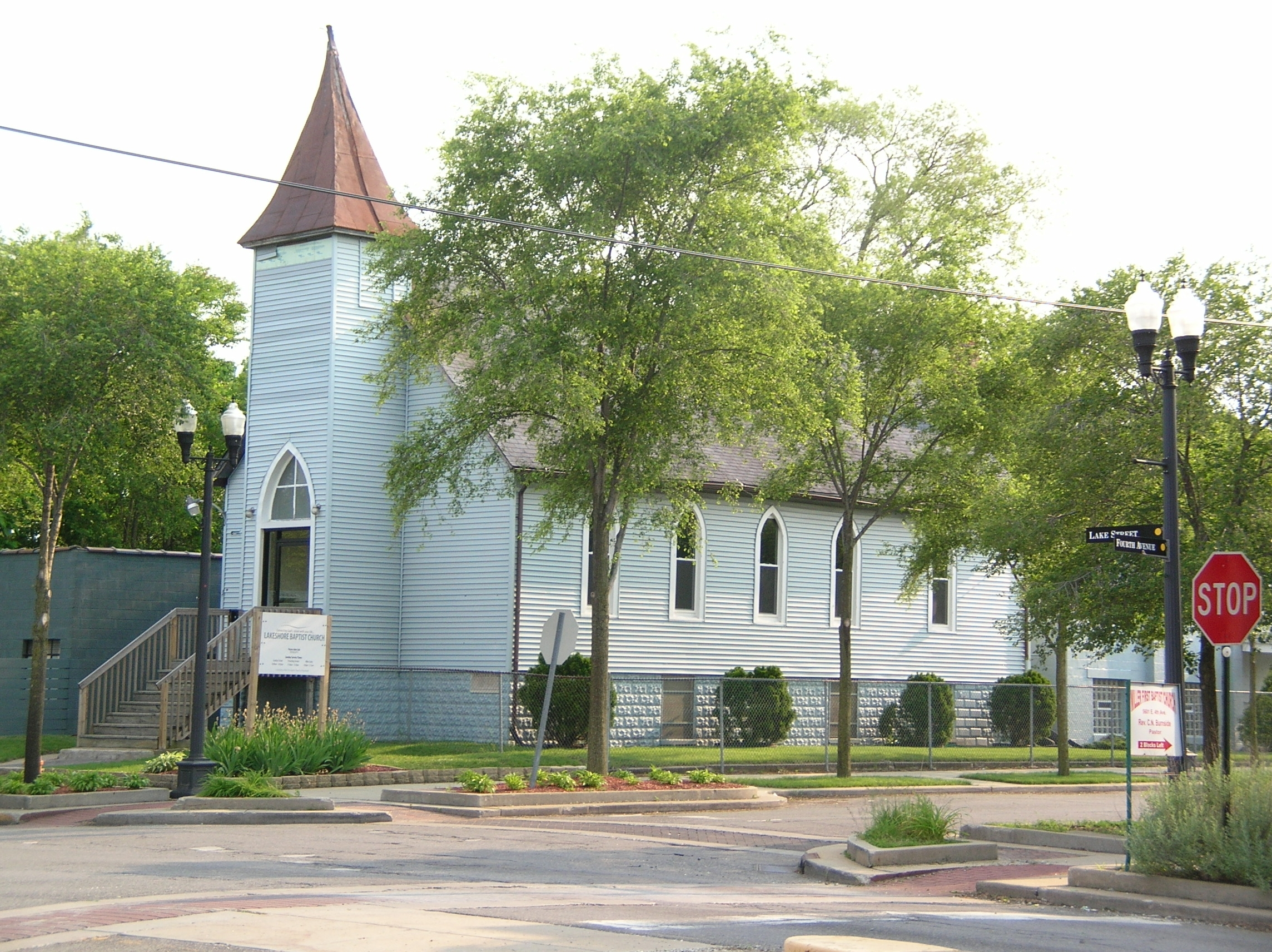
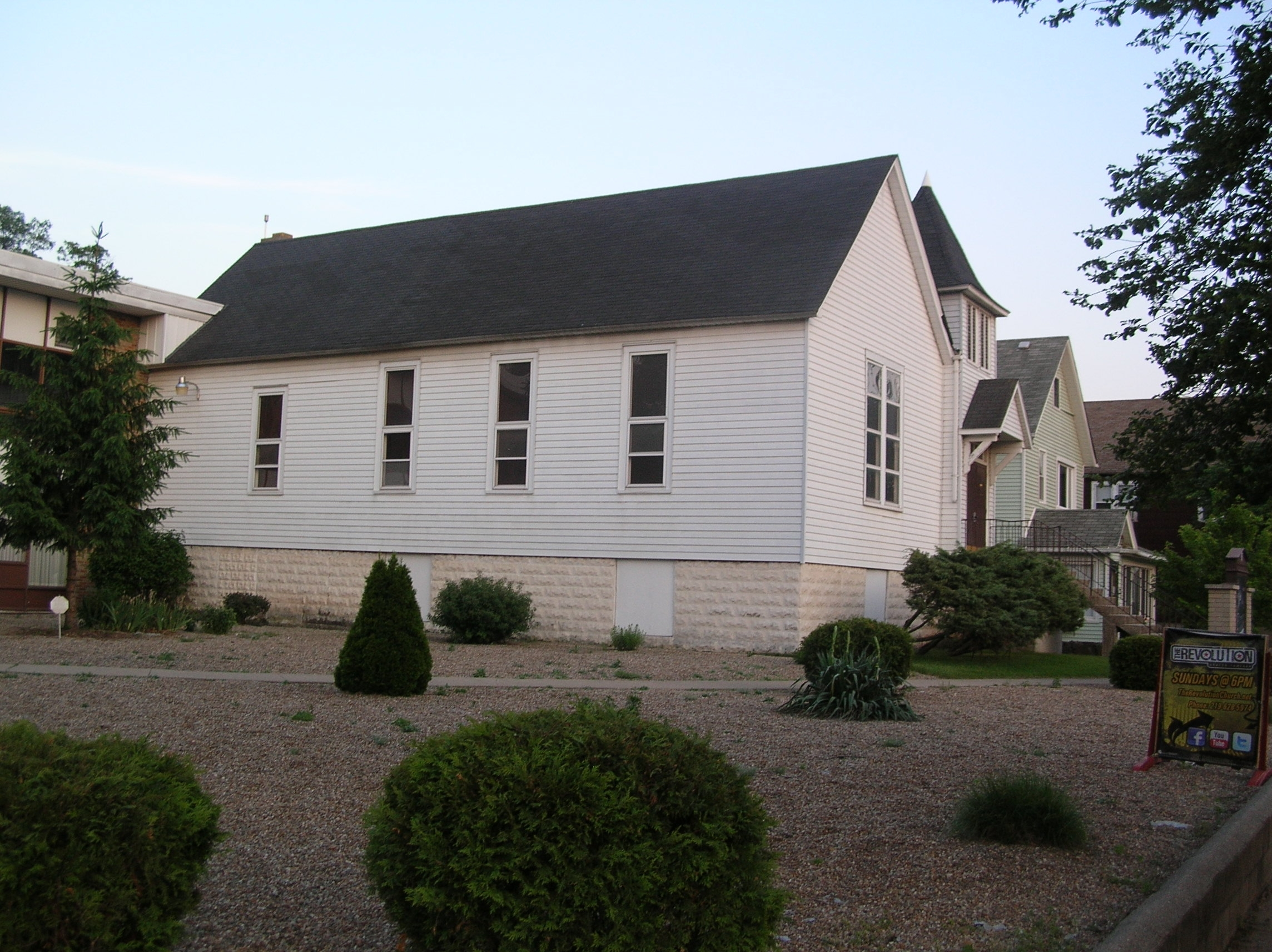
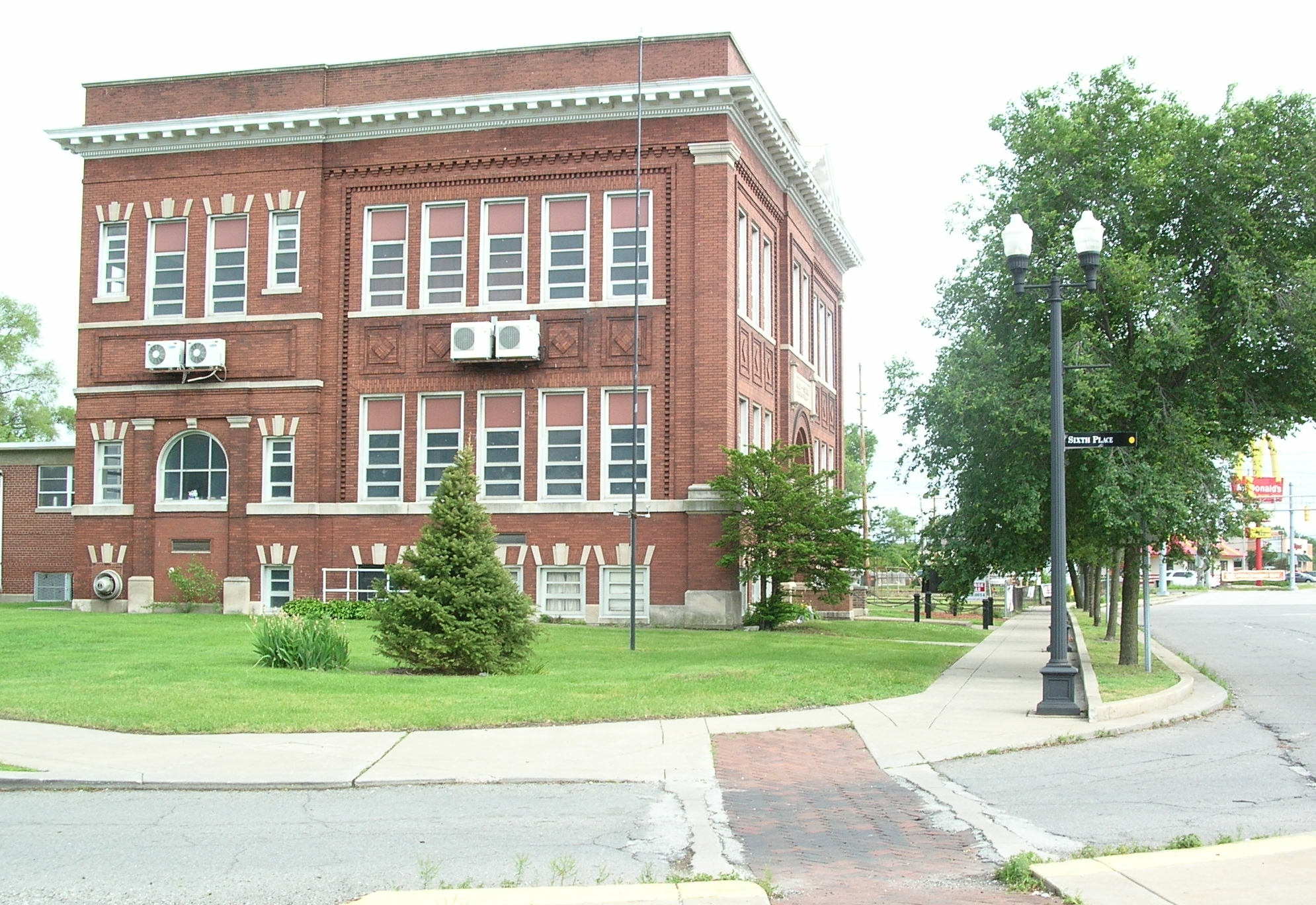
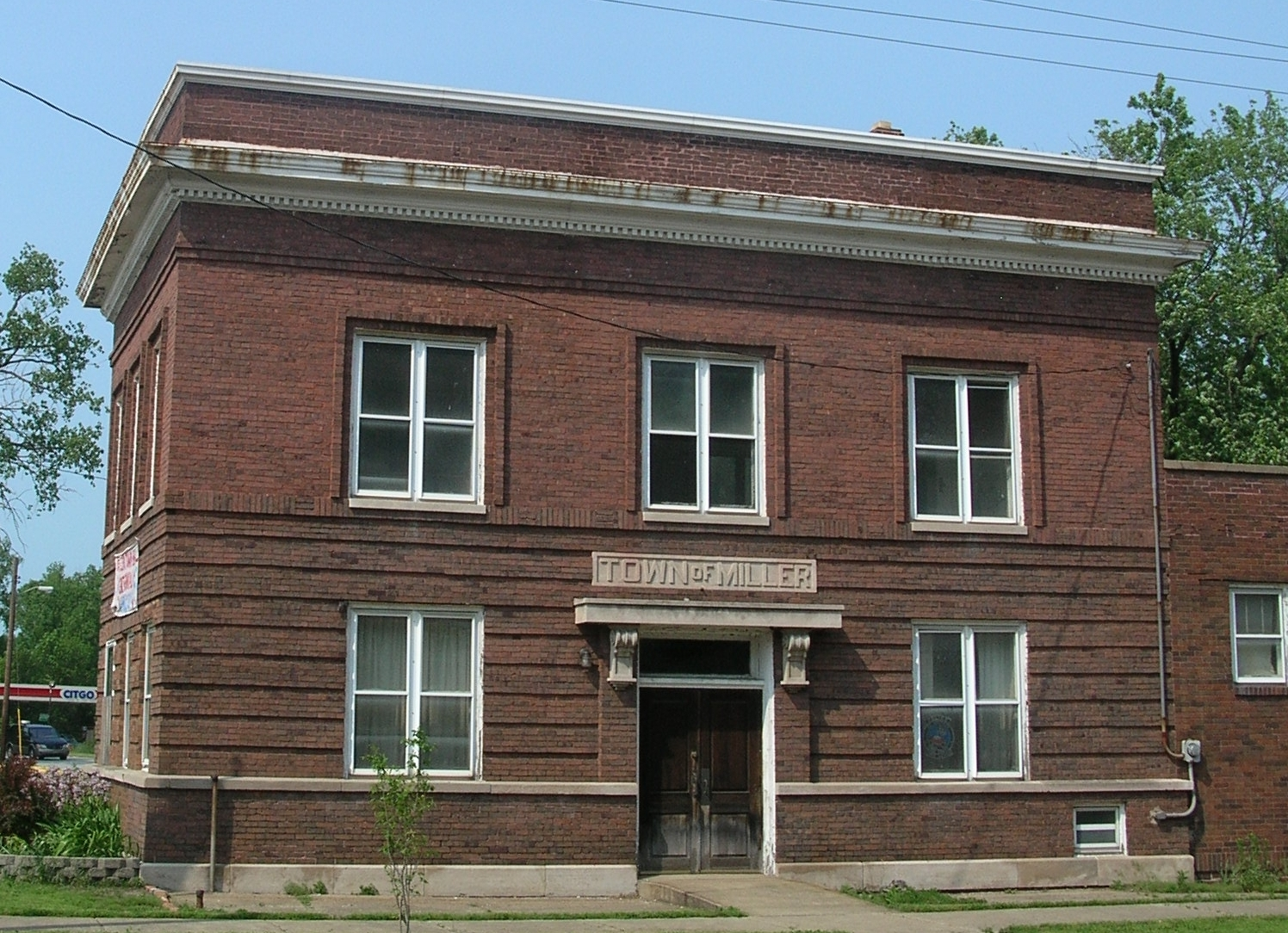
Historic structures of downtown Miller Beach: Bethel Lutheran church (1894), Chapel of the Dunes (1901), Miller School (1910), Miller Town Hall (1911).

Many of the notable sites in Miller Beach are located within its large lakefront park, Marquette Park. Covering 159.4 acres of dunes and beaches, the park was designed in the 1920s by pioneering landscape architect Jens Jensen. Historic structures within Marquette Park include the Chanute Aquatorium and the Marquette Park Pavilion, both designed by Prairie School architect George W. Maher. The beach of the park, known as Marquette Beach, has been a popular summer destination since the early 20th century. Because of Octave Chanute's experiments in the area, the park has been designated a National Landmark of Soaring.

A bronze statue of the park's namesake, Father Jacques Marquette, stands at the park entrance. The statue was installed in 1931 when the park, formerly known as Lake Front Park, was rededicated under its current name. It was created by beaux-arts architectural sculptor Henry Hering, and has an ornate limestone base designed by the Walker and Weeks architectural firm. Restoration work on the statue began in October 2010. The Marquette Park Pavilion, constructed in 1924 by Maher, stands immediately across from the statue.

The Pavilion sits on the south bank of the East Lagoon of the Grand Calumet River. The lagoon has been extensively landscaped in accordance with Jensen's park design. In the center of the lagoon stands a small man-made island, Patterson Island, built by the Works Progress Administration in the 1930s. The island is connected to the shore by two footbridges: a suspension bridge on the north and a Japanese-style bridge on the south.

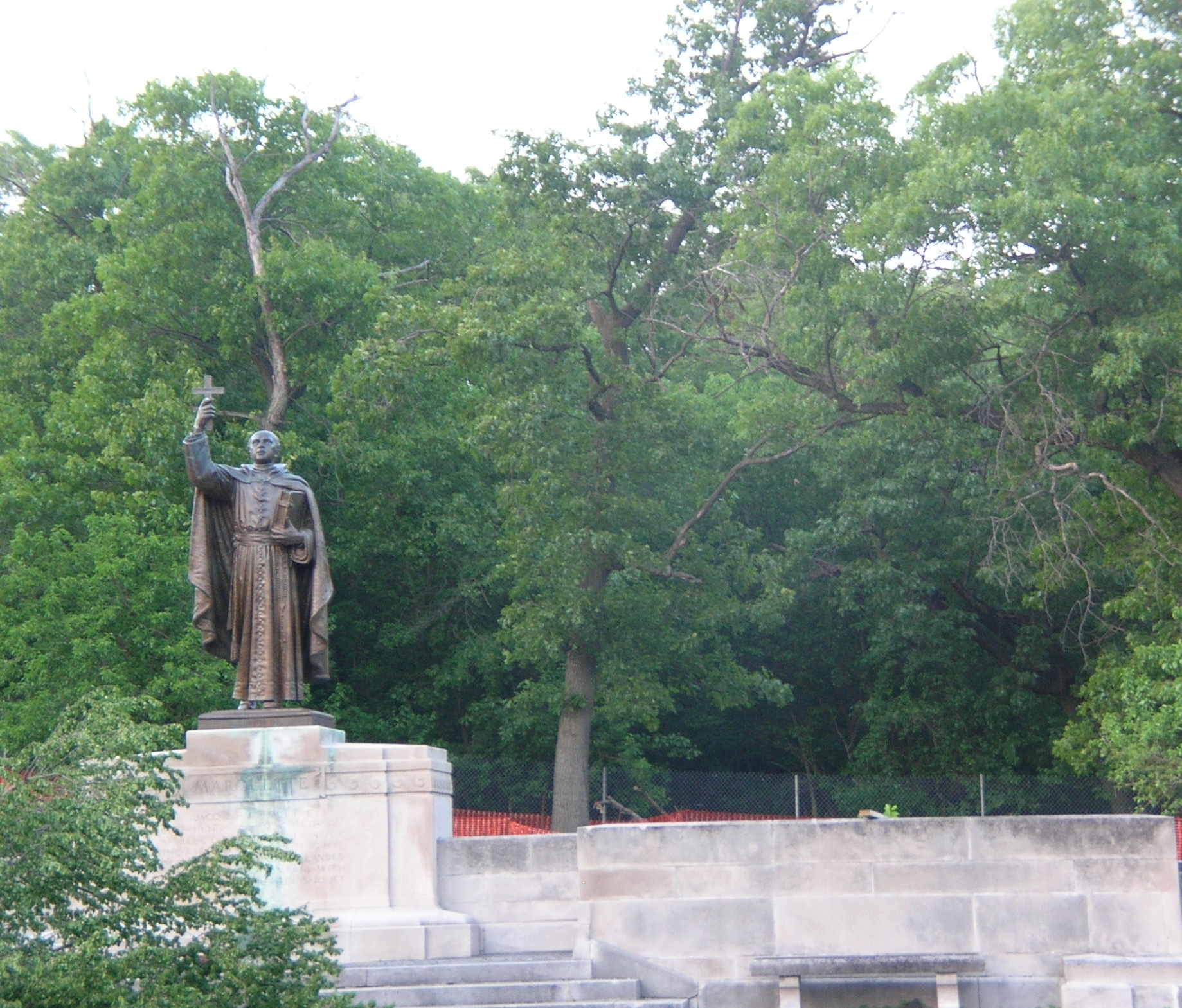
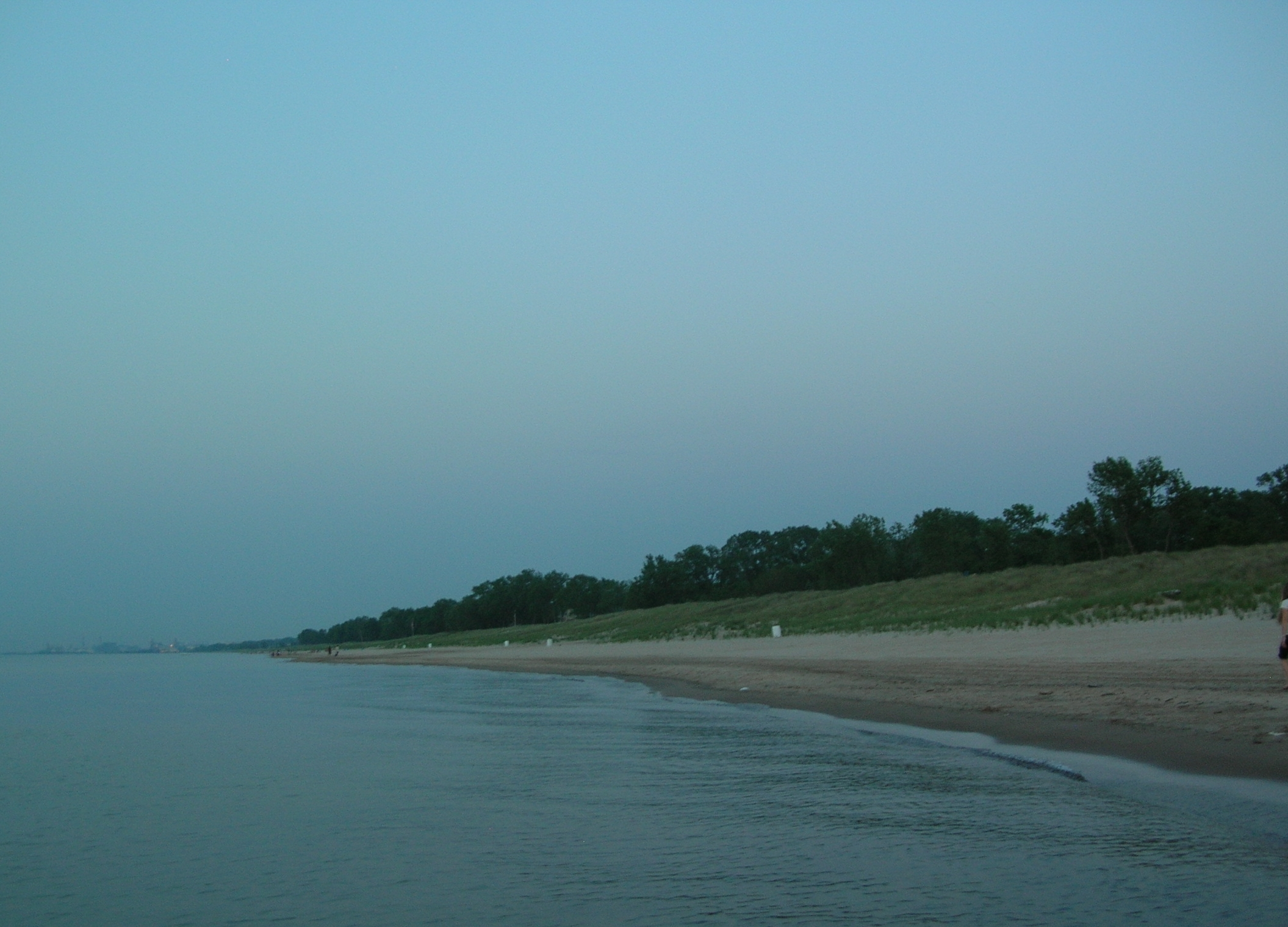
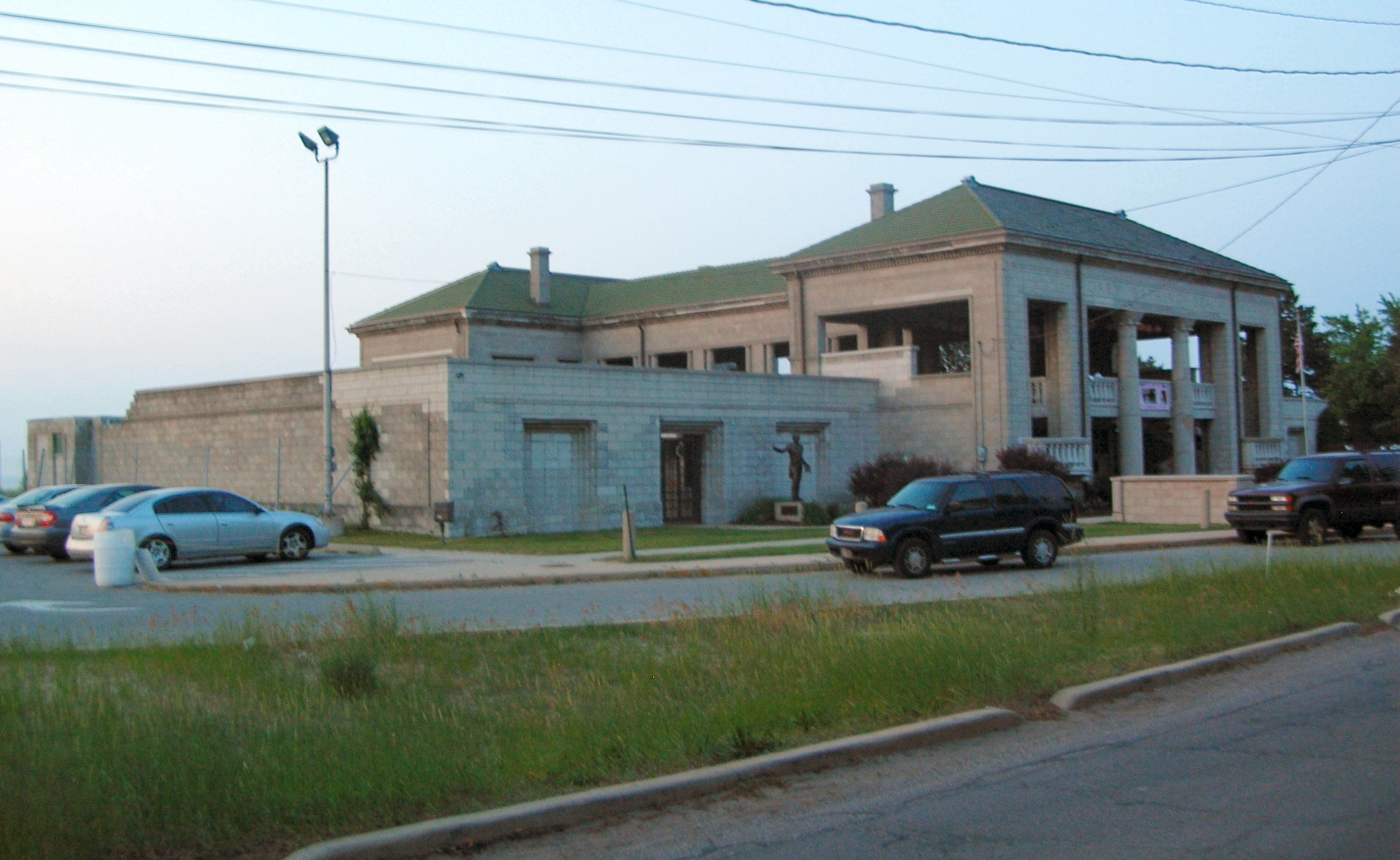
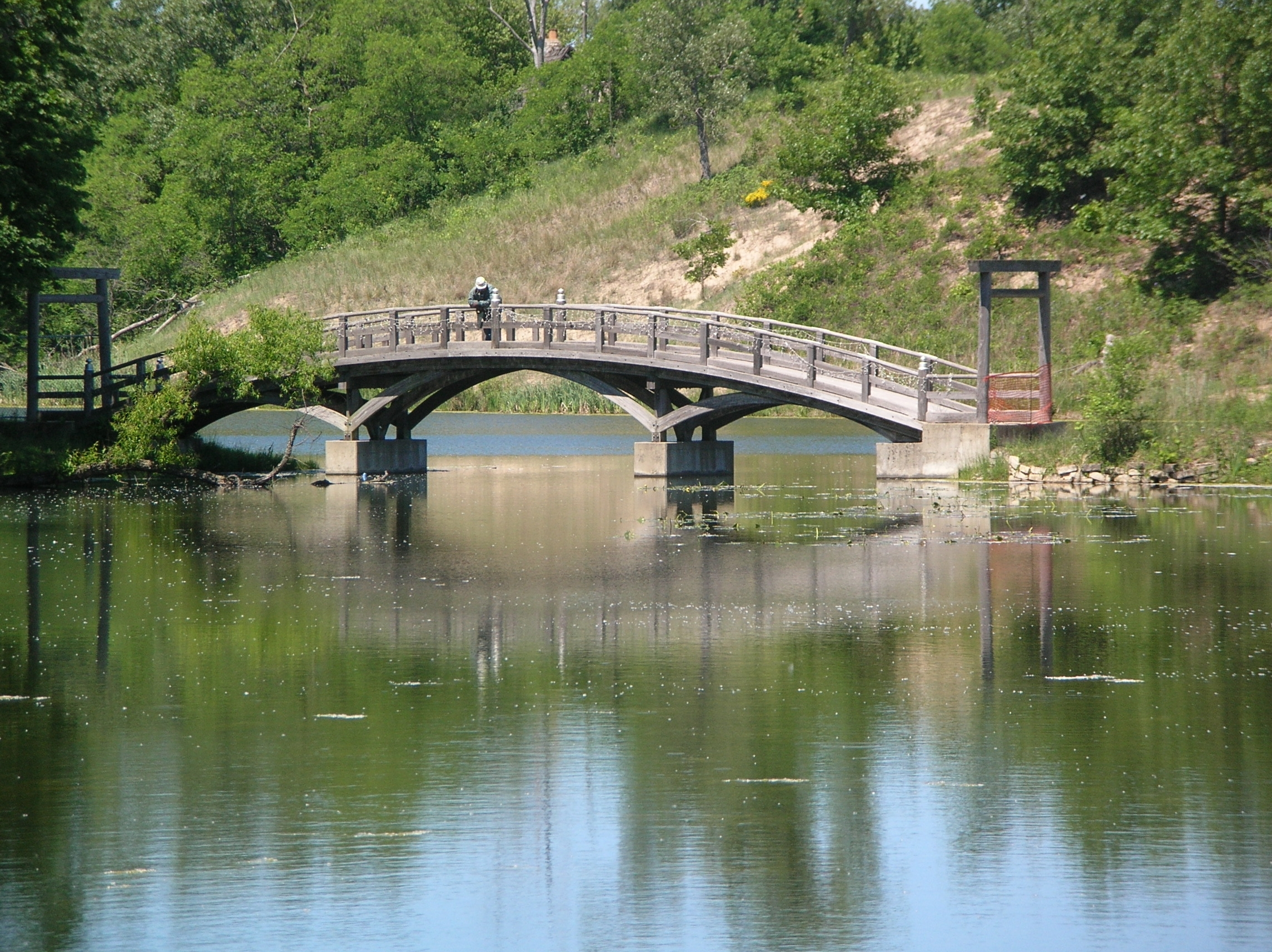
Landmarks of Marquette Park: Pere Marquette statue by Henry Hering, Marquette Beach, Chanute Aquatorium, Japanese bridge on East Lagoon

As of 2011, a US$28 million project to improve Marquette Park was underway, funded by a grant from the Northwest Indiana Regional Development Authority. Begun in 2009, the project was the first capital improvement to Marquette Park since 1931. In addition to Marquette Park itself, the project covers the entire lakefront of Miller Beach, including the Lake Street and Wells Street beaches, for a total of 241 acres.

Two buildings in Miller Beach are on the National Register of Historic Places. The Miller Town Hall, built in 1911, was added to the Register in 1978. The Chanute Aquatorium on the Marquette Park lakefront was added to the Register in 1994. A Classical Revival structure designed by George W. Maher, the Aquatorium was built in 1922. Originally a bathhouse, it fell into disuse in the mid-20th century and was closed and nearly demolished in 1971. With the support of a society of local residents, the building was remodeled as a combination of an aviation museum and public event space.

== Works cited ==
- Adler, Jeffrey S. (2001). African-American mayors: race, politics, and the American city. ISBN 0-252-02634-9.
- Beauvoir, Simone de (1993). Letters to Sartre. Quintin Hoare translation. ISBN 1-55970-212-5.
- Bogue, Margaret Beattie (1985). Around the shores of Lake Michigan: a guide to historic sites. ISBN 0-299-10000-6.
- Brock, Kenneth J. (1999). "Birds of the Grand Calumet River basin". Proceedings of the Indiana Academy of Science. 108/109: 145–162. Archived from the original on March 23, 2012.
- Catlin, Robert A. (1993). Racial politics and urban planning: Gary, Indiana, 1980-1989. ISBN 0-8131-1798-4.
- Choi, Young D. (1997). "Plants" (PDF). In Moy; Whitman (eds.). Status, Trends, and Potential of Biological Communities of the Grand Calumet River Basin. pp. 33–77.
- Cockrell, Ron (1988). A Signature of Time and Eternity: The Administrative History of Indiana Dunes National Lakeshore, Indiana. Omaha, Nebraska: National Park Service.
- City of Gary (2008). City of Gary, Indiana Comprehensive Plan (PDF).
- Engel, Ronald (1986). Sacred Sands: The Struggle for Community in the Indiana Dunes. ISBN 0-8195-6129-0.
- Federal Writers' Project (1939). The Calumet region historical guide. [Gary, Ind.] Garman printing co. ISBN 9780404579210.
- Garza, Eric L.; Nevers, Meredith B.; Whitman, Richard L. (2002). Ecological Characterization of Long Lake, Porter and Lake Counties, Indiana (PDF). Archived from the original (PDF) on September 30, 2011.
- Greenberg, Joel R. (2002). A natural history of the Chicago Region. ISBN 0-226-30648-8.
- Greer, Edward (1979). Big steel: Black politics and corporate power in Gary, Indiana. ISBN 0-85345-490-6.
- Hurley, Andrew (1995). Environmental Inequalities: Class, Race, and Industrial Pollution in Gary, Indiana, 1945-1980. University of North Carolina Press. ISBN 9780807845189.
- Indiana Department of Natural Resources (June 1, 2010). "County: Lake" (PDF). Indiana County Endangered, Threatened and Rare Species List.
- Indiana Department of Natural Resources, Division of Water (1994). Unconsolidated Aquifer Systems of Lake County, Indiana (PDF).
- Indiana Department of Natural Resources, Jewish Heritage Initiative (n.d.). "Lake County History" (PDF).
- Lane, James B. (1979). City of the century: a history of Gary, Indiana. ISBN 0-253-11187-0.
- Lane, James B.; Cohen, Ronald (1983). Gary, Indiana: A Pictorial History. ISBN 1-57864-210-8.
- McHugh, Paula (April 12, 2007). "Visiting Miller Beach's History" (PDF). The Beacher. Vol. 23, no. 14. pp. 1–4.
- Middleton, William D. (1970). South Shore: The Last Interurban. ISBN 0-87095-003-7.
- Mierzwa, Kenneth S.; Cortwright, Spencer A.; Beamer, David (1997). "Amphibians and Reptiles" (PDF). In Moy; Whitman (eds.). Status, Trends, and Potential of Biological Communities of the Grand Calumet River Basin. pp. 138–160.
- Moore, Powell (1959). The Calumet Region: Indiana's Last Frontier.
- Nevers, Meredith Becker; Whitman, Richard L.; Gerovac, Paul J. (1999). "History and environmental setting of the Grand Calumet River". Proceedings of the Indiana Academy of Science: 3–10. Archived from the original on February 2, 2015.
- Raffert, Stewart (1996). The Miami Indians of Indiana. ISBN 0-87195-132-0.
- Schoon, Kenneth J. (2003). Calumet Beginnings. ISBN 978-0-253-34218-8.
- Simon, Thomas P.; Moy, Philip B. (1997). "Fishes" (PDF). In Moy; Whitman (eds.). Status, Trends, and Potential of Biological Communities of the Grand Calumet River Basin. pp. 113–137.
- Simon, T.P.; Jankowski, R.; Morris, C. (2000). "Modification of an index of biotic integrity for assessing vernal ponds and small palustrine wetlands using fish, crayfish, and amphibian assemblages along southern Lake Michigan" (PDF). Aquatic Ecosystem Health and Management. 3 (3): 407–418. doi:10.1080/14634980008657038. S2CID 218638034.
- Skertic, Mark (2003). A Native's Guide to Northwest Indiana. ISBN 1-893121-08-9.
- Stewart, Paul M.; Butcher, Jason T. (1997). "Grand Calumet Lagoons" (PDF). In Moy; Whitman (eds.). Status, Trends, and Potential of Biological Communities of the Grand Calumet River Basin. pp. 230–260.
- Svengalis, Kendall F. (2006). Gary, Indiana: A Centennial Celebration. ISBN 978-0-9767864-4-3.
- Swink, Floyd; Wilhelm, Gerould (1994). Plants of the Chicago region. ISBN 1-883362-01-6.
- Turner, Glenda (1984). Dune country: A hiker's guide to the Indiana Dunes. ISBN 978-0-8040-0854-9.
- Whitaker, John O. (1997). "Mammals" (PDF). In Moy; Whitman (eds.). Status, Trends, and Potential of Biological Communities of the Grand Calumet River Basin. pp. 194–229.
- Whitaker, John O. (2010). Mammals of Indiana: A Field Guide. ISBN 978-0-253-22213-8.
