= Miller Woods =

Unit of Indiana Dunes National Park

Coordinates: 41.6061°N 87.2678°W

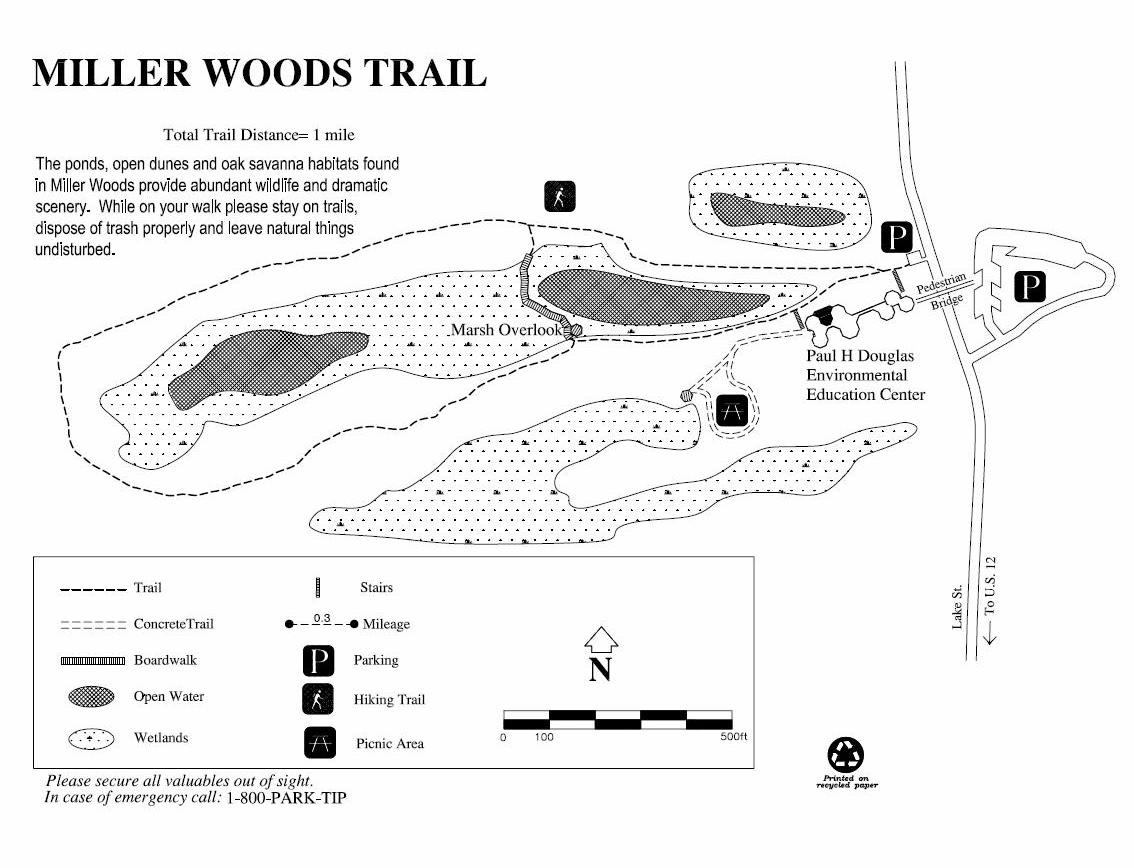
Map of the public trails at Miller Woods

Miller Woods is a western unit of Indiana Dunes National Park in the lakefront community of Miller Beach, Indiana. Miller Woods is home to the federally endangered Karner Blue butterfly and the federally threatened Pitcher's thistle. Miller Woods is also the only part of the National Park that also adjoins the Grand Calumet River.

The northern part of Miller Woods adjoins Lake Michigan, and includes foredunes and high dunes, as well as blowouts and pannes. The southern and larger part of Miller Woods consists of rolling ridge and swale, with beach ridges dominated by oak savanna. This southern part is also traversed by current and former rail lines. The northern and southern parts are divided by the Grand Calumet River, including the westernmost of the three lagoons that mark the river's modern-day headwaters and former mouth.

== History ==
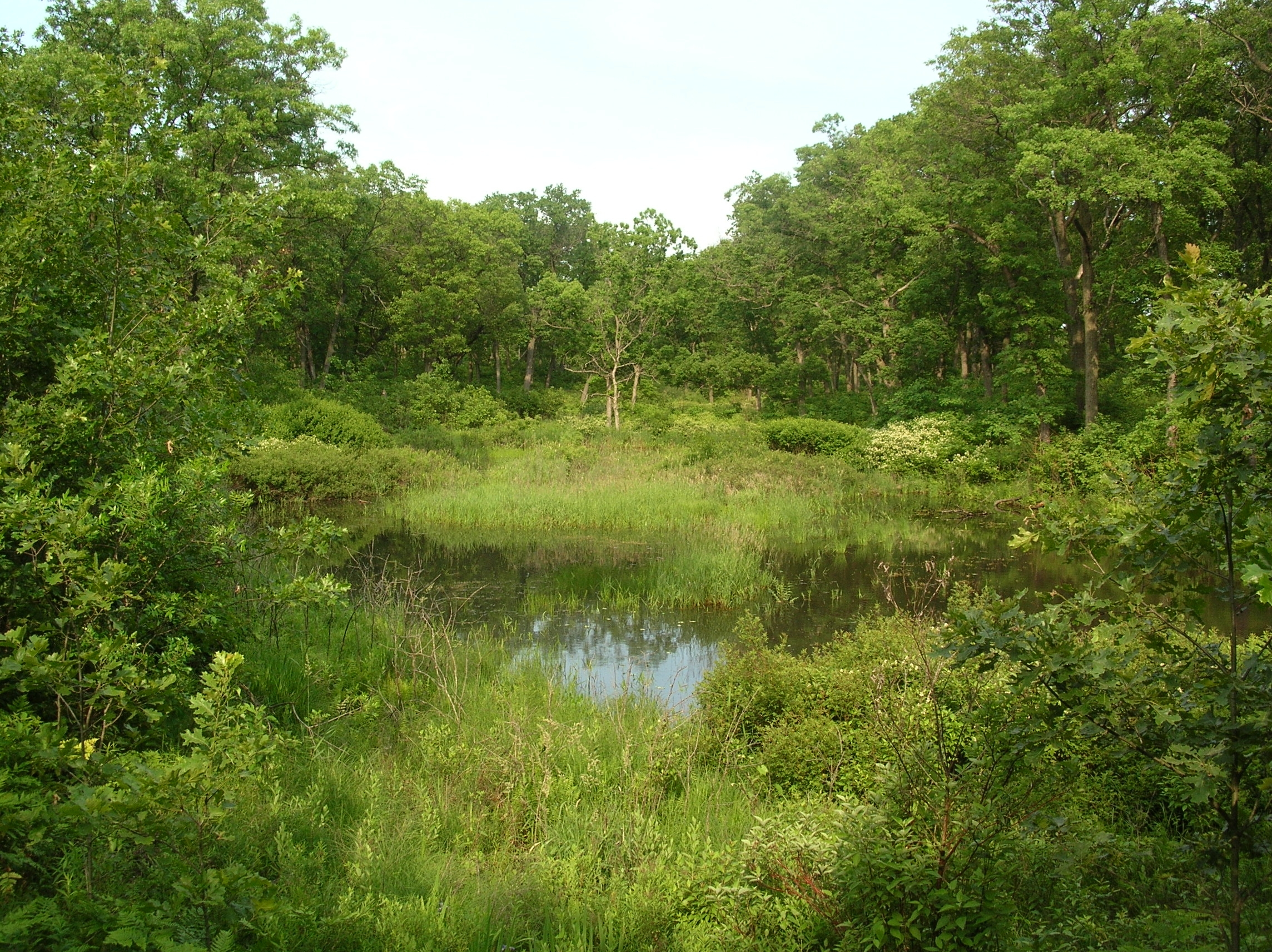
An interdunal swale in the southern part of Miller Woods

Miller Woods was the site of some of Henry Chandler Cowles' earliest observations on ecological succession in the late 19th century. Subsequently, it was acquired by US Steel for industrial use, and a number of railroads and spur lines were laid through the area. This had an unintended beneficial impact for the local oak savanna ecology; the sparks thrown off by passing trains maintained the fire cycle that was suppressed in most other parts of the Indiana Dunes during the 20th century.

The area was acquired by the National Park Service through an expansion bill passed in 1976. The bill was passed in honor of Senator Paul Douglas, who was then on his deathbed, and the Douglas name was applied to the large environmental education center that now stands at the entrance to Miller Woods.

== Flora and fauna ==
Miller Woods is home to at least 287 species of animals and plants. Among them are several species found nowhere else in the Dunes, including the fame flower. The area is known for its brilliant displays of wildflowers such as columbine and sundial lupine.

Mammals

- Virginia opossum
- short-tailed shrew
- masked shrew
- eastern mole
- cottontail rabbit
- white-footed mouse
- prairie deer mouse
- meadow vole
- muskrat
- fox squirrel
- Southern flying squirrel
- gray squirrel
- thirteen-lined ground squirrel
- red squirrel
- raccoon
- long-tailed weasel
- white-tailed deer
- coyote
- beaver
- groundhog

== See also ==
- Indiana Dunes National Park
- Long Lake (Indiana)
