= Indiana City, Indiana =

Coordinates: 41°37′6″N 87°15′36″W

Indiana City was a notional community in northern Lake County, Indiana, at the mouth of the Grand Calumet River. It was located in present-day Marquette Park in Miller Beach, near the southern tip of Lake Michigan. Indiana City was one of a handful of early contenders to be a port city on southern Lake Michigan, alongside Chicago, City West, and Michigan City.

Plats for the town were drawn up in 1836 or 1837, but it was never built. Like City West to its east, the Indiana City project was doomed by the panic of 1837. The plat was not recorded until January 1838, and it is uncertain whether any plots were ever sold. Had it been built, the town would have stretched for 25 blocks, covering much of present-day Miller Beach from the lakeshore to the former Indian boundary line.

The site's strategic location at the river mouth had attracted attention early on. Bennett's Tavern, which served the stagecoaches that ran along the lakeshore, had been built near the site in 1833 and remained in operation for several years thereafter. The tavern was the first regular European habitation in Lake County. Even earlier, in the 1820s, Joseph Bailly purchased 2,000 acres in the vicinity, and laid plans for a town to be called Bailly's Harbor; but like Indiana City, this never came to fruition.

In subsequent years, the mouth of the Grand Calumet drifted shut, creating the Miller Lagoons, which are now the headwaters of a river that flows in the opposite direction from that of the 1830s.

== Works cited ==
- Simon, Linda; Ammeson, Jane (2012). Miller Beach. ISBN 9780738593647.
- Schoon, Kenneth J. (2003). Calumet Beginnings. ISBN 978-0-253-34218-8.
