= Reservation of use and occupancy =

Reservation of use and occupancy (abbreviated ROU or RUO) is an arrangement in US law that allows for residents to continue to use and/or occupy their property for a certain period after selling that property to the US government. It is typically provided in exchange for a reduction in the purchase price of the property, and is commonly used when expanding national parks and wilderness areas that are close to residential areas. RUOs are also sometimes provided to businesses operating in areas acquired for wilderness protection. Provisions governing RUOs are found in several different portions of Title 16 of the United States Code, depending on the specific park or other protected area involved.

RUOs are often incorrectly referred to as "leasebacks", although residents make no payment to the government during their period of allowed occupancy.

The National Park Service, the most common custodian of RUO property, contends that it does not have the power to modify the length or other terms of an RUO, because it is a direct arrangement between the resident and the US government.
