= Ridge and swale =

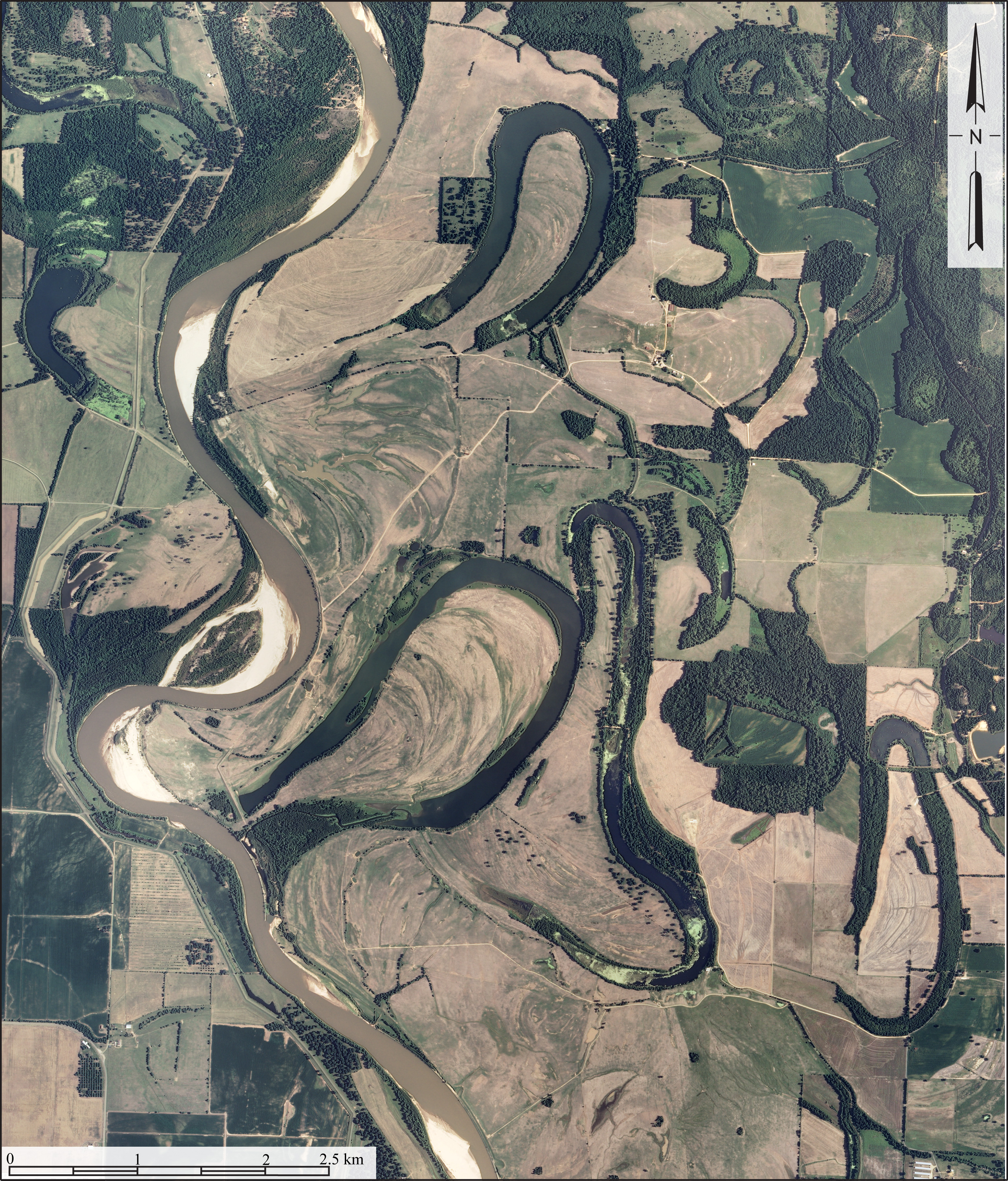
An aerial photograph of the meandering course of the Red River in Lafayette and Miller counties, Arkansas. It shows point bars, abandoned meander loops, ox bow lakes, and ridge and swale topography associated with the active course of the river

Ridge and swale, or in dunal areas dune and swale, is a landform consisting of regular, parallel ridges alternating with marshy depressions. Ridge-and-swale landscapes are most commonly formed by the gradual movement of a beach, for example as a result of gradually fluctuating water levels, or the shifting meanders of a river. In the river context, ridge-and-swale landscapes are commonly formed by scroll bars. They are also found along ocean coasts, for example on the Outer Banks of North Carolina.

== Great Lakes ridge and swale ==
Freshwater ridge-and-swale ecosystems are globally rare and found only in parts of the Great Lakes of North America. They were formed as a result of the gradual retreat of beaches due to falling water levels and post-glacial rebound. The swales and the adjoining lake or river commonly form a single hydrological unit, so that rising or falling lake levels will cause water levels in the swales to rise or fall as well. Most ridge-and-swale landscapes have been destroyed as a result of the massive industrial development found in many former ridge-and-swale areas, such as the Calumet Region of Northwest Indiana. However, some extensive dune-and-swale complexes persist in Michigan, such as at the Michigan Wilderness State Park. The remaining dune-and-swale complexes along the Great Lakes are often home to extremely rare plants and animals, such as the endangered Karner Blue butterfly.

In the Calumet Region, the difficulty of moving equipment through dune-and-swale topography greatly slowed industrial development, but could not stop it after the turn of the 20th century. The few remnants are preserved as nature preserves, including the Gibson Woods county park in Hessville, Indiana, the Miller Woods section of the Indiana Dunes National Park, and additional preserves operated by The Nature Conservancy and Shirley Heinze Land Trust.

== Works cited ==
- Kenneth Schoon (2016). Shifting Sands: The Restoration of the Calumet Area. ISBN 978-0-253-02340-7.
