= Long Lake (Indiana) =

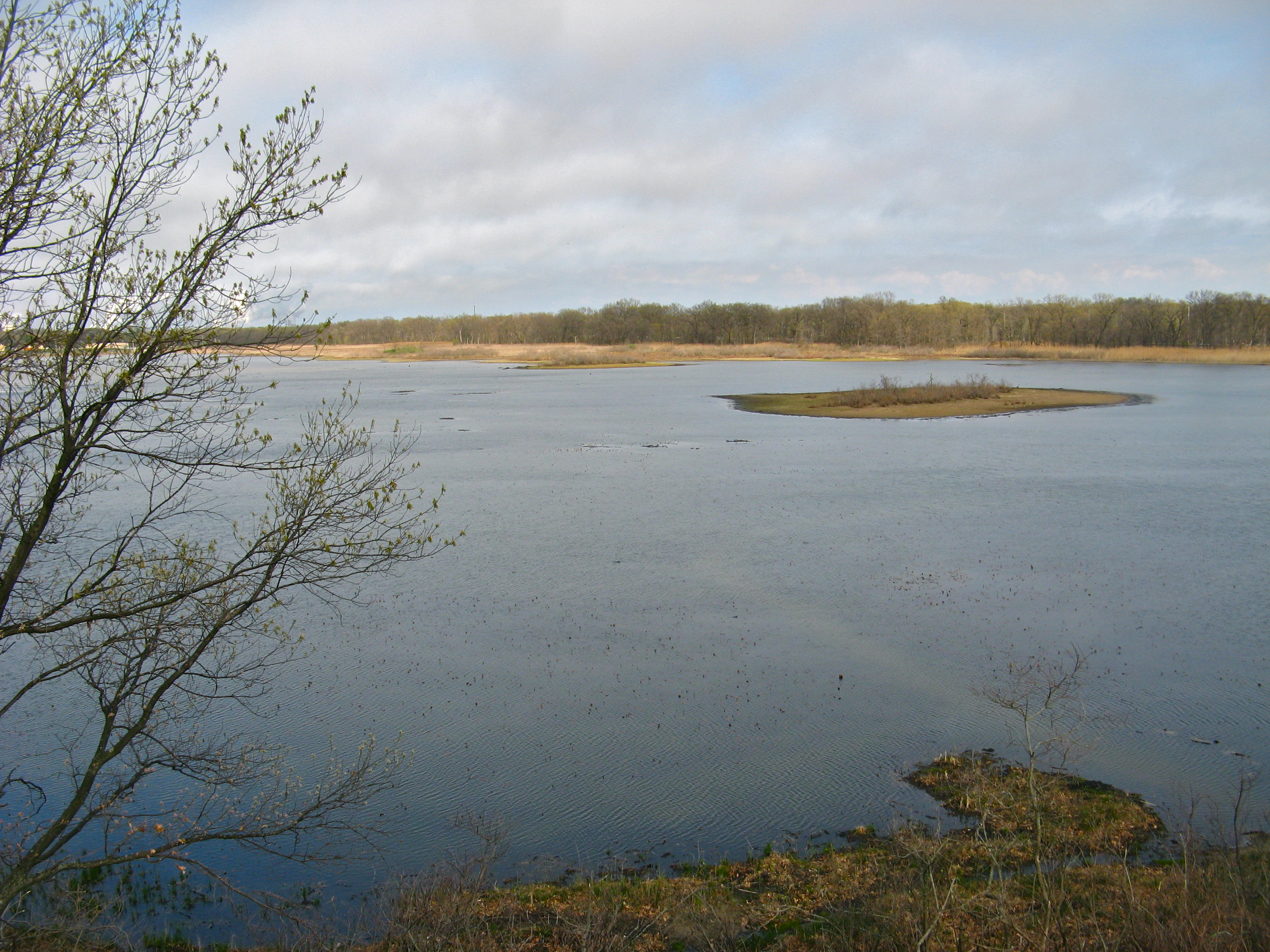

- Location within Indiana Location within the United States
- Location: Porter County, Indiana
- Coordinates: 41°36′55″N 87°12′43″W
- Type: lake
- Surface elevation: 604 feet (184 m)

Long Lake is a large interdunal wetland in the Indiana Dunes region of Northwest Indiana. It was originally approximately 8 miles in length, but has been shortened due to development and drainage. It has a surface area of 34 hectares, and a maximum depth of 1.8 meters. There are three small islands, and the total shoreline length is 4.6 kilometers.

Long Lake is bisected by a major local arterial road, County Line Road. The eastern portion of the lake lies in Porter County in the town of Ogden Dunes, and the western portion is in Lake County in the Miller Beach community. The vast majority of Long Lake is within the boundaries of the Indiana Dunes National Park, although a small area at the eastern end in Ogden Dunes is used by the American Water company for a water purification plant

Along the southern edge of the lake the Norfolk Southern railway, South Shore Line railway, and U.S. Route 12 highway run in parallel. The north side of Long Lake was formerly traversed by the Indiana Harbor Belt Railroad. That railway has now been replaced by the Marquette Trail and Long Lake Trail, multi-use trails used by cyclists, hikers and birdwatchers.

== History ==
Long Lake was one of the focus of Diana of the Dunes conservation efforts. Others joined these conservation efforts to preserve the Indiana Dunes.

In the 19th century, the ice of Long Lake furnished a livelihood for early inhabitants of the small town of Miller, which later became Miller Beach; ice was harvested from the lake and shipped to market by rail. The ice also provided a surface for ice-skating between Miller and Baillytown. A recreational fishery also flourished on the lake in the early 20th century, when a more diverse biota was present than today, including largemouth bass and yellow perch.

In 1920s, the construction of County Line Road separated the western portion of Long Lake from the larger, deeper eastern portion. No culvert connects the two halves; as a result, fish and many aquatic plants are periodically killed off when the western portion dries out during dry summer weather.

== Flora and fauna ==
The shores of the western section of Long Lake are dominated by monospecific stands of cattails. The eastern section is dominated by more diverse successional growth. In summer, the open water is almost completely covered by pond lilies and water lilies.

Occasional fish kills, which occurred in 1990 and 2000, have reduced the number of species present in the lake. Species found in recent surveys have included green sunfish, bluegill, black bullhead, golden shiner, common carp and fathead minnow.

Amphibians found in and near Long Lake include the tiger salamander, blue-spotted salamander, chorus frog, spring peeper, American toad, Fowler's toad, green frog and bullfrog. Reptiles include the snapping turtle, common musk turtle, painted turtle, common garter snake, racer, Eastern hognose snake, and six-lined racerunner. There has been an unconfirmed sighting of the rare Eastern Massasauga rattlesnake near Long Lake as well, and the slender glass lizard is found nearby.

Long Lake is a popular stopover for migratory birds. Warblers nesting in nearby forests also often forage along the shoreline.
