= Chronology of the Indiana Dunes =

Chronology of a natural feature

The Indiana dunes have been a cross road of activity since the glacier receded. Great explorers such as Jacques Marquette and René-Robert Cavelier, Sieur de La Salle traversed this area. As early as 1862, the area was noted for its unique natural resources. At the start of the 20th century, the dunes were a living laboratory for scientist studying plants, animals, and the changes in the land. The first ecologist (Henry Chandler Cowles) did his pioneering work here.

A student of Cowles, O. D. Frank continued Cowle's studies. A museum honoring his work called the Hour Glass is located in Ogden Dunes. Many citizens and politicians have helped to preserve parts of the Indiana Dunes.

== Chronology ==
Date	Event
	Where primary sources are known, references are shown in the table
c. 20,000 BC	Glacial retreat and land subsidence opens St. Lawrence channel to lower lake level; beginning of present dune formations.
1666	Jesuit missionaries, Frs. Allouez, Marquette, Dablon begin to come through area.
1674	Father Marquette pauses on way north, shortly before his death.
1679	LaSalle and Tonti pass through; establish base near St. Joseph.
1750	Little Fort is built by French near site of present Dune State Park
1780	Little Fort abandoned by English; Tom Bradley in the "Battle of the Dunes."
1803	Lt. Swearingen passes through on the way to establish Fort Dearborn.
1822	Joseph Bailly establishes trading post at southern edge of Dunes.
1823	William Keating, geologist, and Thomas Say, naturalist, pass through with other members of Long's Expedition.
1827	First U.S. mail route from Fort Wayne to Fort Dearborn thru Dunes is established.
1833	Charles Fenno Hoffman, Charles Joseph Lagrobe, and Patrick Shireff all pass through the Dunes on stage coach, leaving vivid impression in the respective books.
1835	Joseph Bailly dies.
1836	Removal of Indians from Indiana; Harriet Martineau travels through area, recounts her trip in her book, "Society in America."
1837	Plat of City West recorded; Daniel Webster makes political speech there.
1838	T.B.W. Stockton reports to Congress on the absurdity of the proposed harbor at City West. Accuses the earliest proponents of fleecing the taxpayer for private gain. They sought $150,000 for harbor improvements.
1862	Richard Owen's geological reconnaissance.
1871	Henry Babcock is the first to mention the flora of the Dunes in his publications; he is shortly followed by the stream of papers of J.M. Coulter, E.J. Hill and others.
1892	Whitechapel club cremation at Miller.
1893	W.H. Leman builds the first "permanent" summer cottage in the Dunes proper.
1896	Octave Chanute begins his glider experiments at Miller, later moving to Dune Park.
1897	Frank Morley Woodruff published the first of many papers on the birds of the Dunes.
1899	Henry Chandler Cowles' classic work on the ecological relations of the vegetation of the sand dunes is published.
1907	George D. Fuller classic work on tiger beetles and plant succession in the Dunes is published; South Shore Electric line in constructed.
1908	First formal hike to the Dunes by predecessor of The Prairie Club under Jens Jensen, Graham Taylor, Amalie Hofer, and others.
1910	The Dunes become the setting for many early movies; Chicago was then the movie capital of the world.
1911	First of a long series of papers on plant succession and ecology of the Dunes by George D. Fuller.
1912	"Voice of the Dunes" the first of Earl Reed's charming books on the Dunes is published. Plans for first Prairie Club camp at Tremont; beginning of park agitation.
1913	International Phytogeographic Excursion spends a large share of its time in the Dunes, which are deemed one of the three most interesting areas of the U.S. by foreign scientists.
1915	Diana of the Dunes (Alice Gray) comes to the dunes.
1916	National Dunes Association is formed, A.F. Knotts, president, Mrs. Frank J. Sheehan, secretary. Director of the National Park Service Mather calls meeting in Chicago for Dunes National Park project with overwhelming sentiment in favor of it. World War I prevents its realization.
1919	Marquette Park established
1925	Indiana Dunes State Park established
1966	Indiana Dunes National Lakeshore established (P.L. 89-761).

Date	Event
1968	West Beach acquired.
1970	James R. Whitehouse, First Superintendent at Indiana Dunes Nat'l Lakeshore.
1972	Indiana Dunes National Lakeshore dedicated by official ceremony.
1974	U.S. Army Corps of Engineers (USACOE) constructed first beach nourishment at Mt. Baldy (total 227,000 cubic yards (174,000 m^{3}) or 305,100 tons). Also rebuilt portions of Lake Front Drive and constructed the Beverly Shores rock revetment. Total cost $3.1 million.
1976	Restoration of Bailly Homestead begins. Congress passed legislation expanding lakeshore boundaries (something to illustrate 4 expansion bills with photos of lands acquired—e.g. Miller Woods) primarily in the West Unit and Heron Rookery (P.L. 94-549).
1977	Nike Base is transformed into park headquarters. West Beach bathhouse, parking area and entrance road opened.
1979	Bailly Cemetery renovated. Bailly Administrative Area headquarters renovated; headquarters staff moves from Visitor Center.
1980	Congress passed legislation further expanding park, principally to accommodate redevelopment plans (P.L. 96-612)
1981	USACOE constructed 2nd beach nourishment at Mt. Baldy (80,000 yd^{3} (61,000 m^{3}) or 108,000 tons).
1983	Dale B. Engquist becomes second Superintendent at national lakeshore.
1986	Paul H. Douglas Center for Environmental Education dedicated and opened for public September 14.
1989	Construction completed on new Lake View facility that opened for public use for the summer. Facility included restrooms, picnic area, Lake Michigan exhibits and beach access. Interior restoration of the first floor of the main house of the Chellberg Farm was completed and the facility opened for public use for the first time during the Duneland Harvest Festival in September.
1992	Indiana Dunes National Lakeshore was officially dedicated in honor of Senator Paul H. Douglas by Senator Paul Simon of Illinois
1993	The park's visitor center was officially dedicated as the "Dorothy Buell Memorial Visitor Center" in recognition of Mrs. Buell's contributions to the establishment of the national lakeshore.
1995	The Dunewood Campground registration building was completed in June and was opened for campers.
1996	USACOE constructed third Mt. Baldy beach nourishment (53,000 yd^{3} or 41,000 m^{3}). Cost – $1.3 million. In addition, 50,000 yd^{3} (38,000 m^{3}) were placed by pipeline from hydraulic dredging of the outer harbor at Michigan City ($321,000).
1998	The first phase of construction of the IDELC at Camp Good Fellow was opened for use in October. The first phase consisted of 5 cabins and a multipurpose building. Five more cabins were to be added to use by spring, 1999.
2003	Historic Sears catalog (aka Larson) house rehabilitated for the Great Lakes Research & Education Center
2007	Costa Dillon becomes third Superintendent at national lakeshore.
2014 (May)	Paul Labovitz becomes fourth Superintendent at national lakeshore.
2019	Indiana Dunes National Park designated February 15, 2019
