= Marquette Park (Gary) =

Park in Indiana, United States

Coordinates: 41°37′6.1″N 87°15′35.7″W

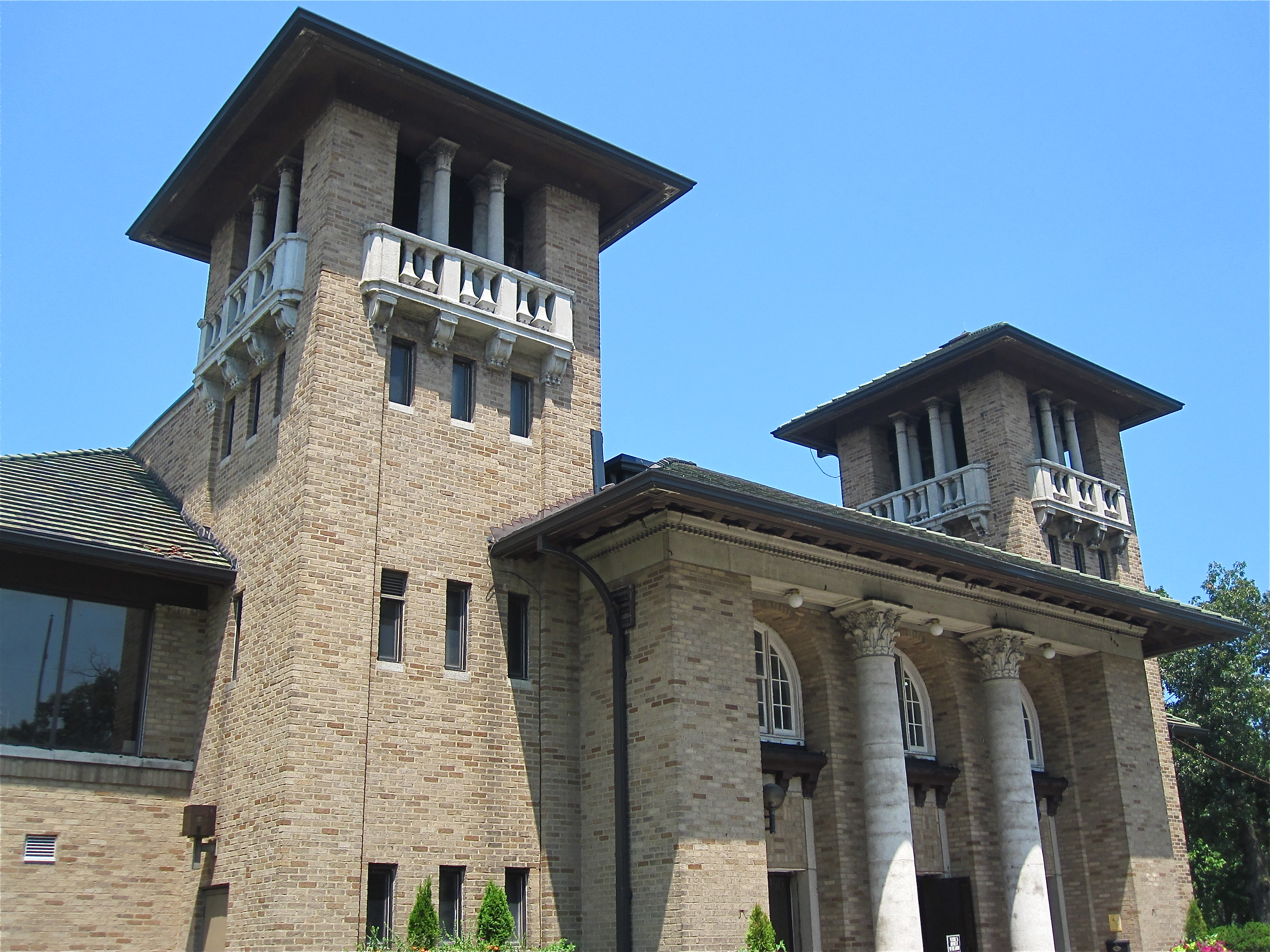
Marquette Park Pavilion

Marquette Park, originally called Lake Front Park, is a municipal park completely surrounded by Indiana Dunes National Park. Its primary features include 1.4 miles (2.2 km) of Lake Michigan beaches, inland ponds, sand dunes, wetlands, a lagoon, and indigenous oak savanna. The park is located within the Miller Beach community. The park includes the Octave Chanute museum, registered as a National Landmark of Soaring.

== History ==
=== Dunes waterfront ===
Before Euro-American settlement, the area was populated by Miami Indians. The entire southernmost edge of Lake Michigan, including Miller Beach, had sandy soil unsuitable for raising crops. However, the land was teeming with wildlife and fish, making the area popular for hunting, trapping and gathering berries. The Miami Indians were driven from the area during the Iroquois Wars of the second half of the 17th century. The Potawatomi Indians then moved into the Miller Beach region from the north.

The explorer Father "Pere" Marquette passed through Miller Beach while returning from his second exploration of the water passage from Lake Michigan to the Mississippi River. In 1673 he and Louis Joliet ventured through Wisconsin and down the Mississippi, returning to Sault Ste Marie via the Illinois and Chicago Rivers. The next year Marquette traveled down Lake Michigan to the Chicago River and the portage to the Illinois, entering the Mississippi in the spring of 1675. Marquette was sick, however, and returning that spring he passed along the shores of Miller Beach close to death. He died only days later at the mouth of the Pere Marquette River in Michigan.

Before the creation of the Marquette Park Lagoon, this location was the site of the mouth of the Grand Calumet River. Joseph Bailly, an early settler in the region, laid out a town to be developed at this location. Dubbed Indiana City, it remained on the maps for many years, but never had more than a few shacks on it. During the Antebellum period the area that was to become the town of Miller became an essential part of the Underground Railroad. The Miller dunes and swamp areas, now part of Marquette Park, served as a haven for runaway slaves.

=== Development of park ===
Until 1874, the parcel that is now Marquette Park was a relatively anonymous patch of dunes waterfront at what was then the mouth of the Grand Calumet River. In 1874, it became part of the 200-acre (0.81 km^{2}) sand dunes homestead of 19th-century settlers Robert and Druisilla Carr. During the Carr period, the dunes became the site of key hang gliding experiments carried out in 1896–1897 by a team led by pioneering aeronaut Octave Chanute.

Although the land had been in the possession of the Carr family for years, in 1919 United States Steel Corporation illegally claimed ownership of the land and gave it to the City of Gary for a park. This illegal land seizure was a focal point in the controversy surrounding the forced annexation of the town of Miller by the city of Gary. When this area was first dedicated to public use it was originally named "Lake Front Park"; however the park was soon renamed in honor of Father Marquette. A statue of the explorer/missionary stands at the gateway to the park.

During the prosperous 1920s, the city of Gary invested a significant sum in landscaping the park. The "Marquette Park Pavilion" was built adjacent to the beachfront, and most of a wetland area behind the beach, formerly part of the Grand Calumet River, was excavated to form the "Marquette Lagoon". Two Japanese-inspired bridges span the lagoon today.

== Historic structures ==
=== Aquatorium ===
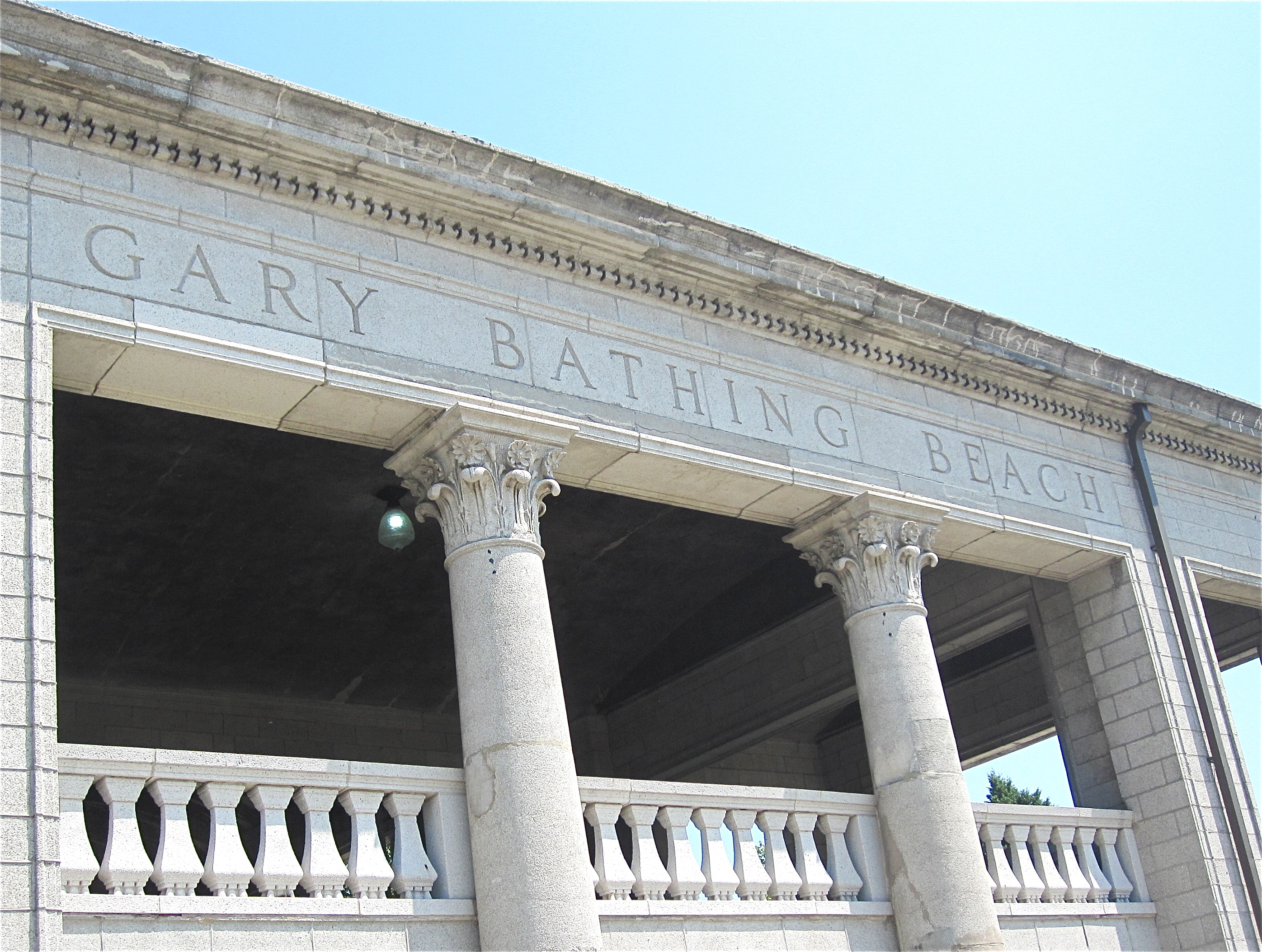
Lakefront Park Bathhouse/Aquatorium

What is now known as the Gary Bathing Beach Aquatorium was designed by the firm of Maher and Sons (George W. Maher, architect) and was built as a shower/bathroom/changing facility in 1921. It was dubbed the Lakefront Park Bathhouse. A major focal point of the Miller Beach community for decades, by the 1960s the facility was falling into major disrepair. In 1971 the building was closed to the public and boarded up. The Aquatorium was rescued from demolition by the Chanute Aquatorium Society in 1991.

The Society invented the word Aquatorium meaning "place to view the water" in order to disassociate the structure with the word bathhouse.

No longer a place to change or shower, the building has been restored as a museum honoring Octave Chanute, the father of flight. Chanute conducted some of the first heavier-than-air glider flights in human history in the high dunes just yards from the structure. His successful experiments and glider designs paved the way for the Wright brothers' powered flight at Kitty Hawk. A replica of Chanute's hang glider celebrates his experiments. The building also honors the Tuskegee Airmen, aeronautic pioneers who spearheaded the integration of the armed forces.

The building is architecturally significant. It is one of the earliest examples of pre-cast concrete modular construction. Ninety percent of the building is built with only six basic cast blocks, the most basic being the T-Block, a precursor of today's standard concrete block. Additional building material has rendered the structure suitable for museum space. Builders demolished the former bathhouse east showers in spring 1998 to commence the construction of the new Tuskegee Airmen Wing in January 1999.

=== Marquette Park Pavilion ===
The "Recreation Pavilion" was built in 1923–24 by Maximillian Dubois' construction company Max and Sons, which also built the Palace Theater in Gary, Indiana. It was also designed by Maher and Sons (George W. Maher, architect), and located on the south side of the lagoon in the Grand Calumet River. The building cost $350,000. Renovated in 1966, in the mid-1990s, and again around 2008, the building is still a popular site for all sorts of events, from weddings to civic functions.

== Recent history and restoration ==
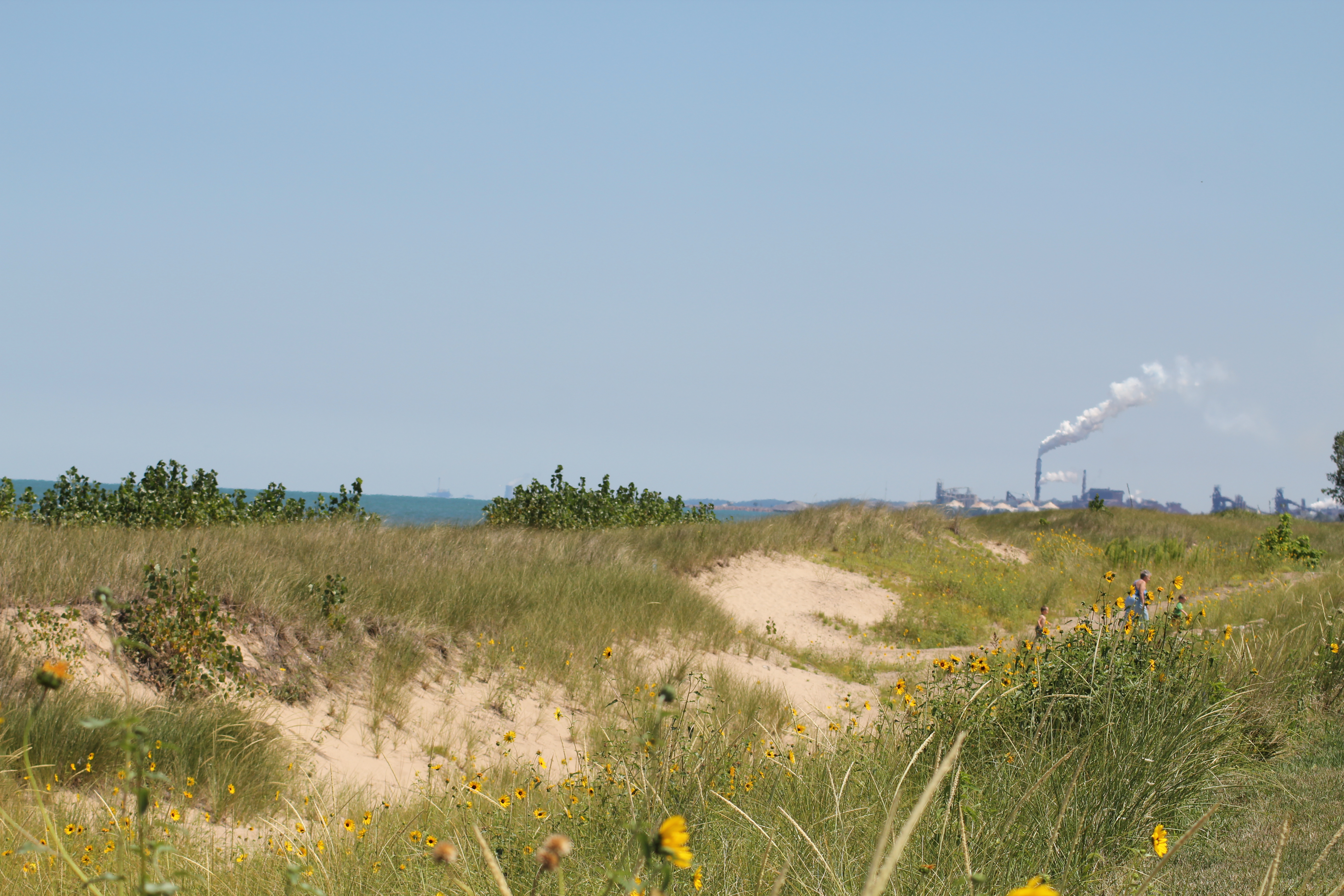
Dunes along Lake Michigan shoreline

By the 1970s, the park had fallen into disrepair. The park's revival began with the restoration of the historic Aquatorium and Marquette Park Pavilion structures in the 1990s as noted above. In 2009 the Northwest Indiana Regional Development Authority (RDA) granted the City of Gary $28,190,000 to design and construct capital improvements within the park which would improve public access to and circulation within the park, preserve and strengthen the park's natural features, provide new recreational and educational amenities, and restore the park's signature historic facilities. In 2010 the city unveiled the Marquette Park Lakefront East Master Plan describing these improvements.

Completion of the $28 million master plan redevelopment was observed and celebrated by The New York Times in August 2017. The article described the renovated Marquette Park Pavilion and the Gary Aquatorium/Museum of Aviation.

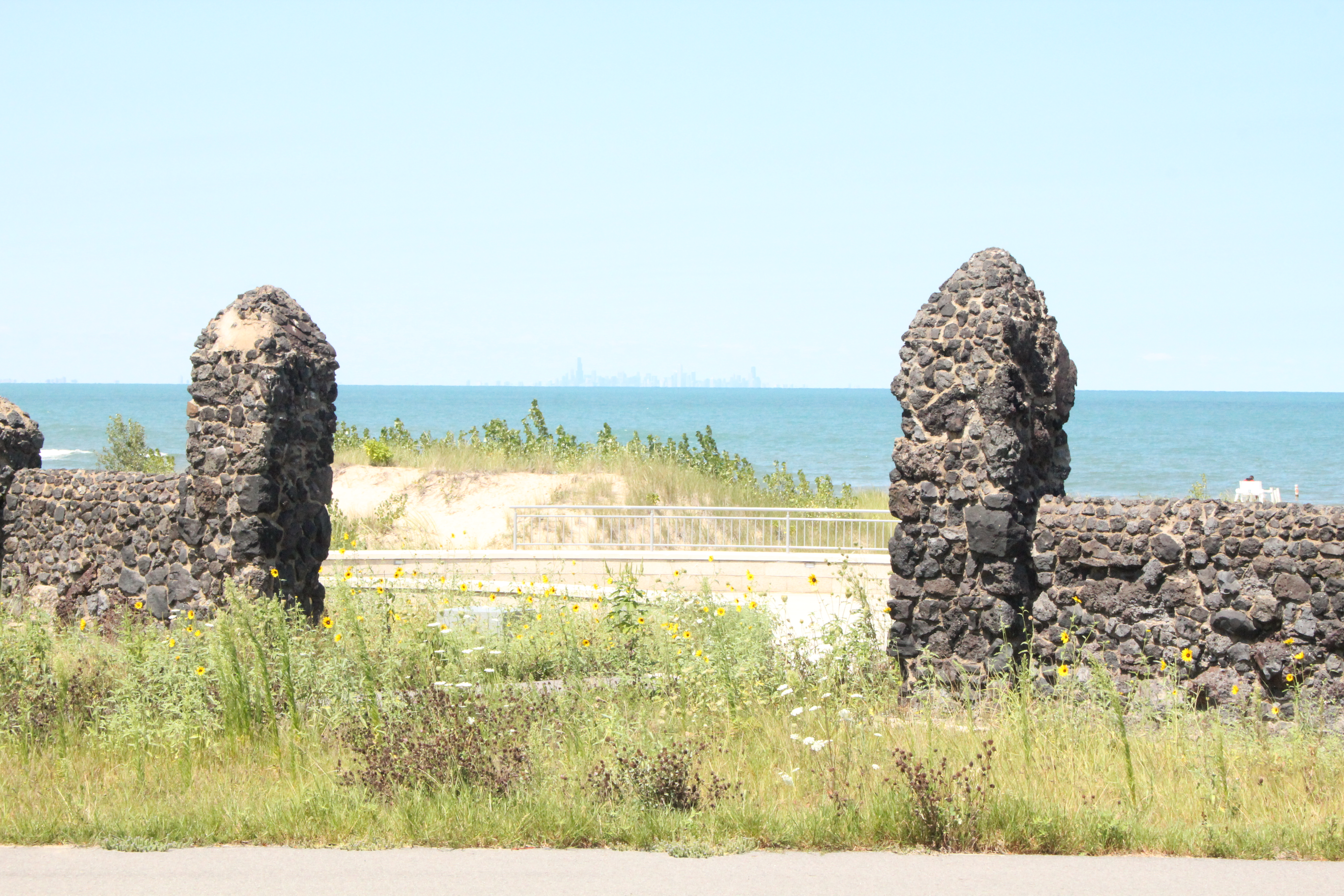
Old stone gates, modern beach access, and Chicago skyline in the distance

== See also ==
- Birds of the Indiana Dunes, Mammals of the Indiana Dunes, and Habitats of the Indiana Dunes
- Chronology of the Indiana Dunes
- Indiana Dunes State Park
- National Landmark of Soaring
- Marquette (disambiguation) for other places, buildings and geographic objects named after Father Jacques Marquette.
