= Marfa Municipal Airport =

- IATA: MRF; ICAO: KMRF; FAA LID: MRF

Summary
- Airport type: Public
- Owner: Presidio County
- Serves: Marfa, Texas
- Elevation AMSL: 4,849 ft / 1,478 m
- Coordinates: 30°22′16″N 104°01′03″W

Map

Runways
Direction	Length		Surface
Direction	ft	m	Surface
13/31	6,203	1,891	Asphalt
4/22	5,309	1,618	Asphalt
9/27	2,825	861	Dirt

Statistics (2021)
- Aircraft operations (year ending 5/16/2021): 6,000
- Based aircraft: 27
- Sources: FAA, Texas DOT

Marfa Municipal Airport (IATA: MRF, ICAO: KMRF, FAA LID: MRF) is three miles north of Marfa in Presidio County, Texas. There is currently no scheduled airline service to the airport; until 1960 Trans-Texas DC-3s stopped at the former Marfa AAF, now abandoned, at 30.256N 103.882W east of Marfa.

== Facilities ==
Marfa Municipal Airport covers 816 acres (330 ha) at an elevation of 4,849 feet (1,478 m). It has two asphalt runways: 13/31 is 6,203 by 75 feet (1,891 x 23 m) and 4/22 is 5,309 by 75 feet (1,618 x 23 m). A third runway, 9/27, is 2,825 by 60 feet (861 x 18 m) dirt.

In the year ending May 16, 2021, the airport had 6,000 aircraft operations, average 115 per week, all general aviation. 27 aircraft were then based at the airport: 20 single-engine, 1 multi-engine and 6 glider.

== Glider activity ==
In April 2008 the Marfa Airport was recognized as the 15th National Landmark of Soaring by the National Soaring Museum.

Marfa Gliders offers sailplane flight training and glider rides all year and hosts a soaring camp in spring.

== See also ==
- List of airports in Texas
