= National Landmark of Soaring =

The National Landmark of Soaring program acknowledges people, places and events significant in the history of gliders and motorless aviation in the United States. It is administered by the National Soaring Museum. The program was established in 1980.

The title of National Landmark of Soaring has been granted 16 times.

National Landmarks of Soaring
| NLS number | Landmark/event | Location | Date issued |
|---|---|---|---|
| 1 | Corn Hill | Truro, Cape Cod, Massachusetts | 1981-06-13 |
| 2 | Rhodes Farm | Elmira, New York | 1982-07-10 |
| 3 | Akron Fulton Airport | Akron, Ohio | 1985-06-29 |
| 4 | Sleeping Bear Dunes sites | Frankfort, Michigan | 1992-05-09 |
| 5 | Torrey Pines Gliderport | San Diego, California | 1992-06-06 |
| 6 | Afton Mountain | Waynesboro, Virginia | 1993-09-17 |
| 7 | Point Loma | San Diego, California | 1996-04-27 |
| 8 | Marquette Park, Miller Beach | Gary, Indiana | 1996-07-27 |
| 9 | Nu‘uanu Pali Lookout | Honolulu, Hawaii | 1996-12-08 |
| 10 | Arvin Sierra Gliderport, Tejon Ranch | Arvin, California | 2000-04-29 |
| 11 | Harris Hill Gliding Sites | Elmira, New York | 2000-07-01 |
| 12 | Sierra Wave Project, Bishop Airport | Bishop, California | 2002-06-15 |
| 13 | Raspet Flight Research Laboratory, Mississippi State University | Starkville, Mississippi | 2003-11-01 |
| 14 | Mount Washington | Coos County, New Hampshire | 2005-10-08 |
| 15 | Marfa Airport | Marfa, Texas | 2008-04-05 |
| 16 | Jockey's Ridge State Park, Nags Head | Outer Banks, North Carolina | 2011-10-21 |
