= Habitats of the Indiana Dunes =

Set of habitats in the United States

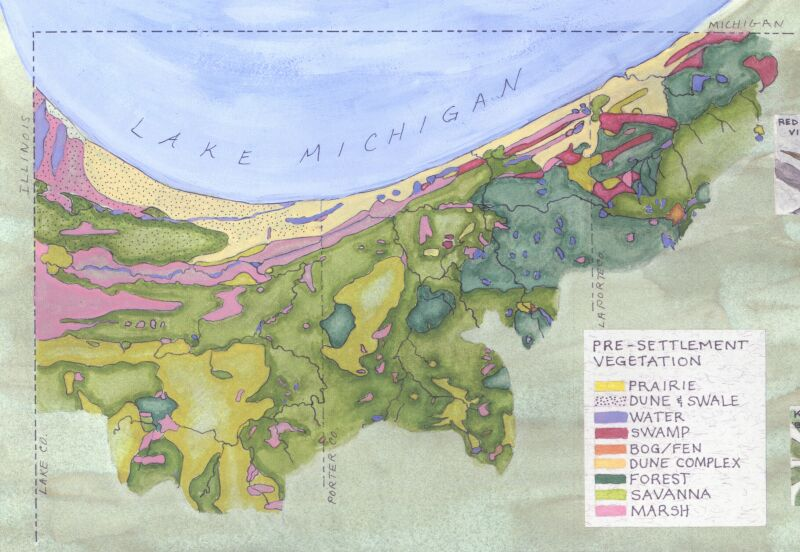
Ecosystems of the Indiana Coastal Region

The Indiana Dunes comprise ten different habitats. Each provides for a unique combination of plants and animals. The range of the Indiana Dunes varies depending your source. The Indiana Lake Michigan Coastal Program uses the river drainage systems along the shoreline. This expands the area from the areas of lakeshore southward to the edges of the Valparaiso Moraine. This entire region has been dune landscapes since over 114,000 years before present (YBP). Traditionally, the Indiana Dunes area thought of as a narrow area along the shores of Lake Michigan, including the areas of Marquette Park in Gary, Indiana (1920), Indiana Dunes State Park (1926) and Indiana Dunes National Park, (1966, designated as a national park in 2019). The identified ten habitats can be found in these parks, where they have been preserved, but are also visible throughout the three counties of Northwest Indiana.

== Prairie ==
The prairie community is dominated by grasses with few to no trees. In the dunes, there are several different prairie types. Each is dependent on moisture levels and soil types. They ranger from wet, Hoosier Prairie to dry, Mnoke Prairie. Soils varies from sand to silt loams. Some key identifiers of a prairie community include the eastern bluebird, blazing starr, and lead plant.

== Dunes ==
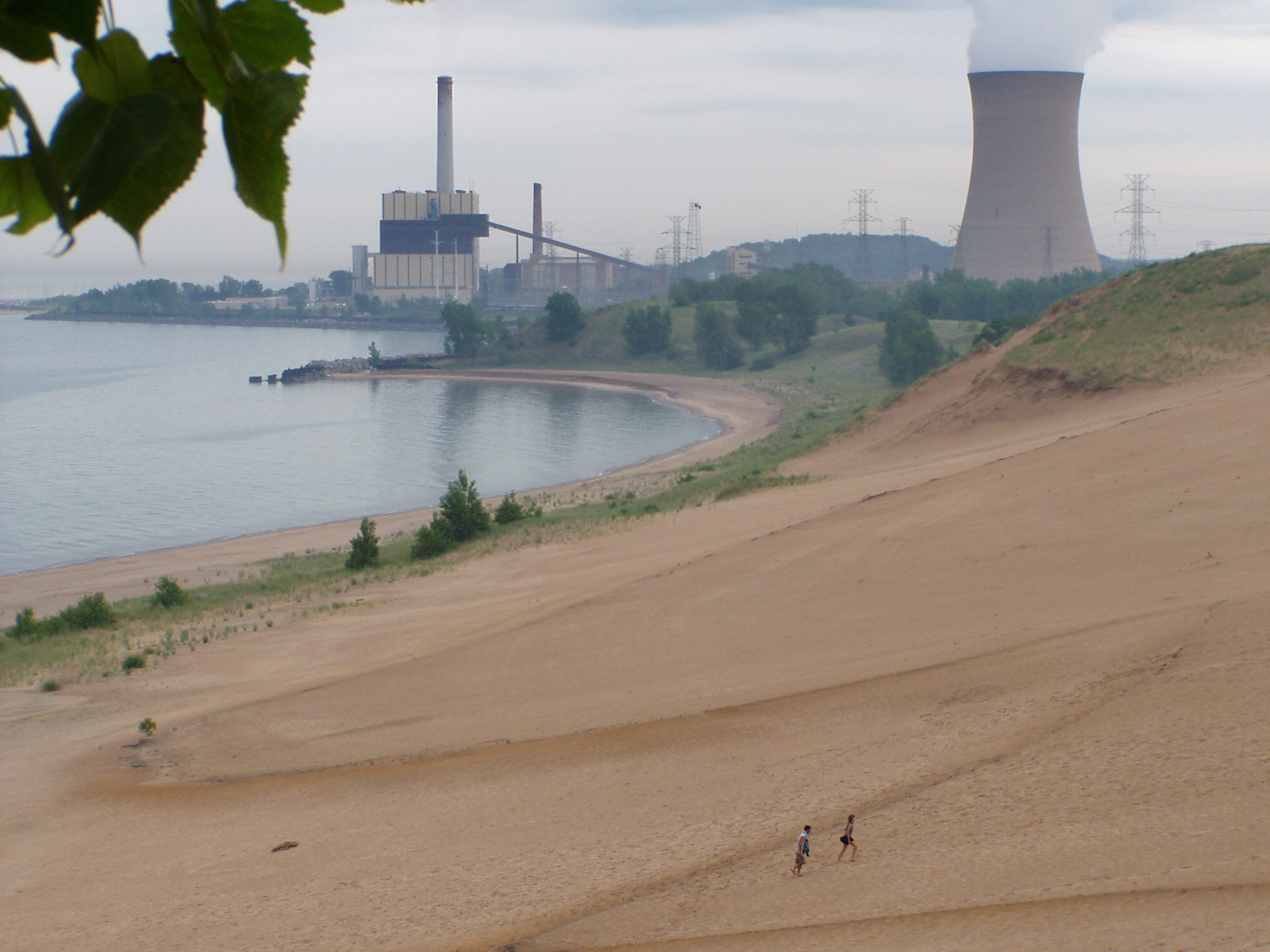
Looking northeast from the top of Mt. Baldy, Indiana Dunes National Park.

The dominant feature of the Indiana Dunes is the dunes. The hills and ridges throughout the southern border of Lake Michigan are predominantly sand ridges, created by the movements of the winds and their deposition of the sands. The dunes cover a complex of plant communities. The central dunes, which were a large area of high and diverse dunes was removed to make way for the Bethlehem Burns Harbor Steel Plant The most accessible dunes are at the West Beach facility of the national park (Dunes Succession Trail); the Tremont's Trail in Indiana Dunes State Park, and at Mt. Baldy, located in the east end of the national park. Some key identifiers of the dune communities include the spotted sandpiper, pitcher's thistle, and olympia marblewing.

== Dune and swale ==
At the west end of the Indiana Dunes, in Gary there is a dune and swale province of the system. The area is characterized by low, linear sand ridges, parallel to the shoreline. Between these ridges are low areas of marsh or ponds. The ridges are characterized by prairie and savanna life forms and the marsh areas and ponds by the plants and wildlife of those characteristic areas of the dune lands. The dune and swale topography is easiest to see in the Miller Woods area of the park. Much of the dune and swales was eliminated by the construction of the industrial plants of Gary, East Chicago, Whiting and Hammond. Some key identifiers of a dune and swale community include the common yellowthroat, Blanding's turtle, and bluehearts.

== River ==
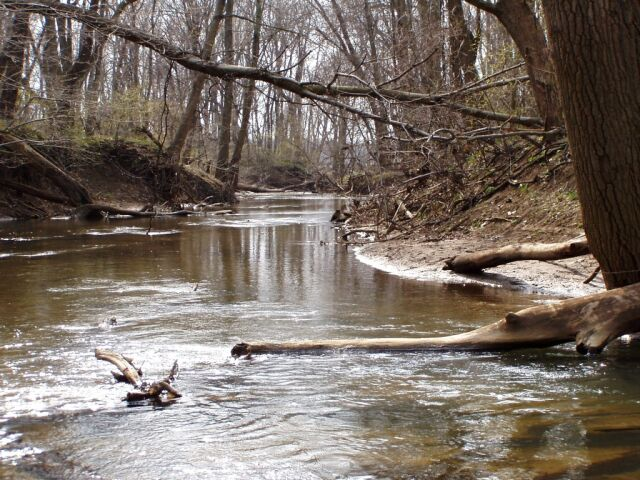
Little Calumet River in the Heron Rookery

The primary river of the dunes is the Calumet River. Its three segments were once a single waterway, parallel to the Lake Michigan Shoreline. On the east is Trail Creek in Michigan City, Indiana. The Calumet River is accessible at several locations. The upper reaches are viewable in the Heron Rookery. The midsection is parallel to the Calumet Trail from the Bailly/Chellberg Parking lot of the national park and the historic mouth exist in the lakes of Marquette Park in Gary. The construction of the Burns Waterway altered the historic flow, creating three 'Calumet' Rivers from the original one. This can be observed from the Portage Lakefront and Riverwalk in the national park adjacent to the steel mills in Burns Harbor. Some key identifiers of a river community include the red-shouldered hawk, Baltimore oriole, and bluntnose minnow.

== Swamp ==
Swamps are wetlands dominated by woody plants. Swamps extend nearly the entire length of the dunes. The wider swamps are in the west in Lake County, Indiana. They parallel the Calumet River and its tributaries. Narrower swamps are found between the various dune ridges, which are also where the rivers are located. Swamp access is available at Inland Marsh in the west end of the national park and in Beverly Shores to the east, the restoration of the Great Marsh is now accessible from a trail off Broadway Ave. In the State Park, trail #10, circles a large wetland, offering Some key identifiers of a swamp community include the gray tree frog, wood duck, and barred owl.

== Lake Michigan ==
The second largest of the North American Great Lakes, the Indiana Dunes are located on its most southern shoreline. This southerly position supports fish and birds that cannot withstand the extreme winters of the northern end of the lake or the deep snows of the eastern shore of the lake. The shoreline currents move and, debris, and other pollutants from the north on both shores to the toe of the lake off the Indiana Coast. The prevailing winds are out of the northwest and west all year. This leads to the creation of a 'snow belt' along the eastern half of the Indiana Shoreline and all of the State of Michigan's Shoreline. The dunes had been dotted with lakes. From the west, they start with the Wolf Lake complex in Hammond. In east Lake County are the Miller Woods ponds (nearly a dozen). North, closer to Lake Michigan, in the old Calumet River bed, are the Marquette Lakes in Marquette Park. Passing into Porter County, there is Long Lake at the West Beach facility of the national park. The state park has a lake in the middle of its nature preserve along trail #10. Several other lakes, including 'Mud Lake' in the Pines have disappeared over time. Some key identifiers of lake include the lake trout, smallmouth bass, and common tern.

== Bog and fen ==
These two types of wetlands are easily confused. A bog is usually the result of a glacial depression, which creates and enclosed drainage system. There will usually be a floating mat of peat moss. On this mat, there will be low heath shrubs. If the bog is old, larger trees will be supported. Pinhook Bog in LaPorte is open to ranger guided tours by the national park. A fen is another wetland form, which is created by a seep from below. The fen is affected by the calcium included in the seepage. It is usually associated with glacial moraines. Vegetation can be either herbaceous plants or heavily forested. The best known fen in the dunes is mistakenly called Cowles Bog, rather than more appropriately, Cowles Fen. Some key identifiers of a bog or fen community include the pitcher plant, swamp sparrow, and Ohio goldenrod.

== Forest ==
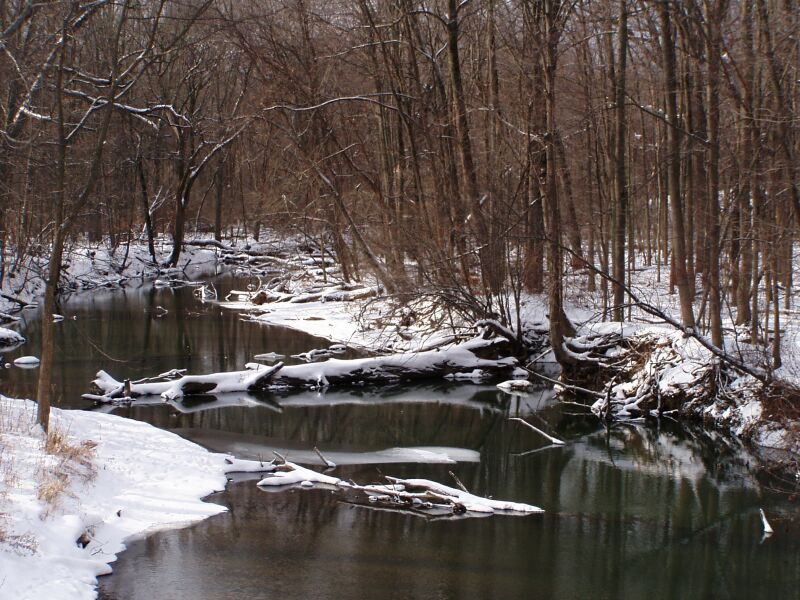
Winter along the Little Calumet River, passing through a floodplain forest at the Bailly Homestead

The dunes include three distinct types of forests. Forests are dominated by mature trees that have nearly a closed canopy during the summer season. In the dunes, there are upland forest, floodplain forest, and flatwoods forests. Upland forests would be visible at Pinhook Bog, in the Hobart Prairie Grove in Hobart along U.S. 20 in Porter County. The best example of a floodplain forest would be along the Calumet Trail, accessible from the Bailly/Chellberg Historic area parking lot. Some key identifiers of a forest community include the red-eyed vireo, ovenbird, and large-flowered trillium.

== Savanna ==
A savanna is a naturally occurring area that is open like a prairie with grasses and herbaceous shrubs dominating, but having a substantial canopy from trees. The canopy is less than 80% of the area, but more than 10%. Where the soils are sandy, the dominant trees are black oak and white oak. When the soil is predominantly a silty loam, burr oak and other oaks are common. Savannas begin along the Tinley Moraine and southward onto the Valparaiso Moraine. Some key identifiers of a savanna community include the red-headed woodpecker, Karner blue, and lupine.

== Marsh ==
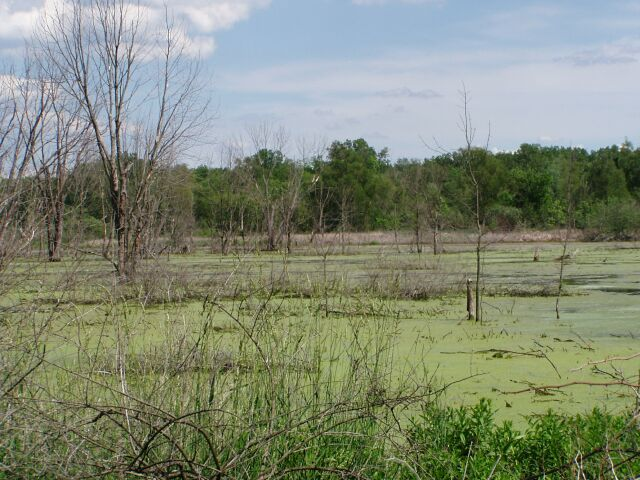
Restored Great Marsh in Beverly Shores, Indiana. (Indiana Dunes National Park)

Another wetland that is predominantly sedges and grasses. It is characterized as having water at the surface or above the surface during most of the year. The great marsh in Beverly Shores is visible the entire length of Beverly Drive from U.S. 12 at Mt. Baldy to its end at East State Park Road. Some key identifiers of a marsh community include the sora, marsh fern, and calico pennant.
