= Gary Bathing Beach Aquatorium =

- U.S. National Register of Historic Places
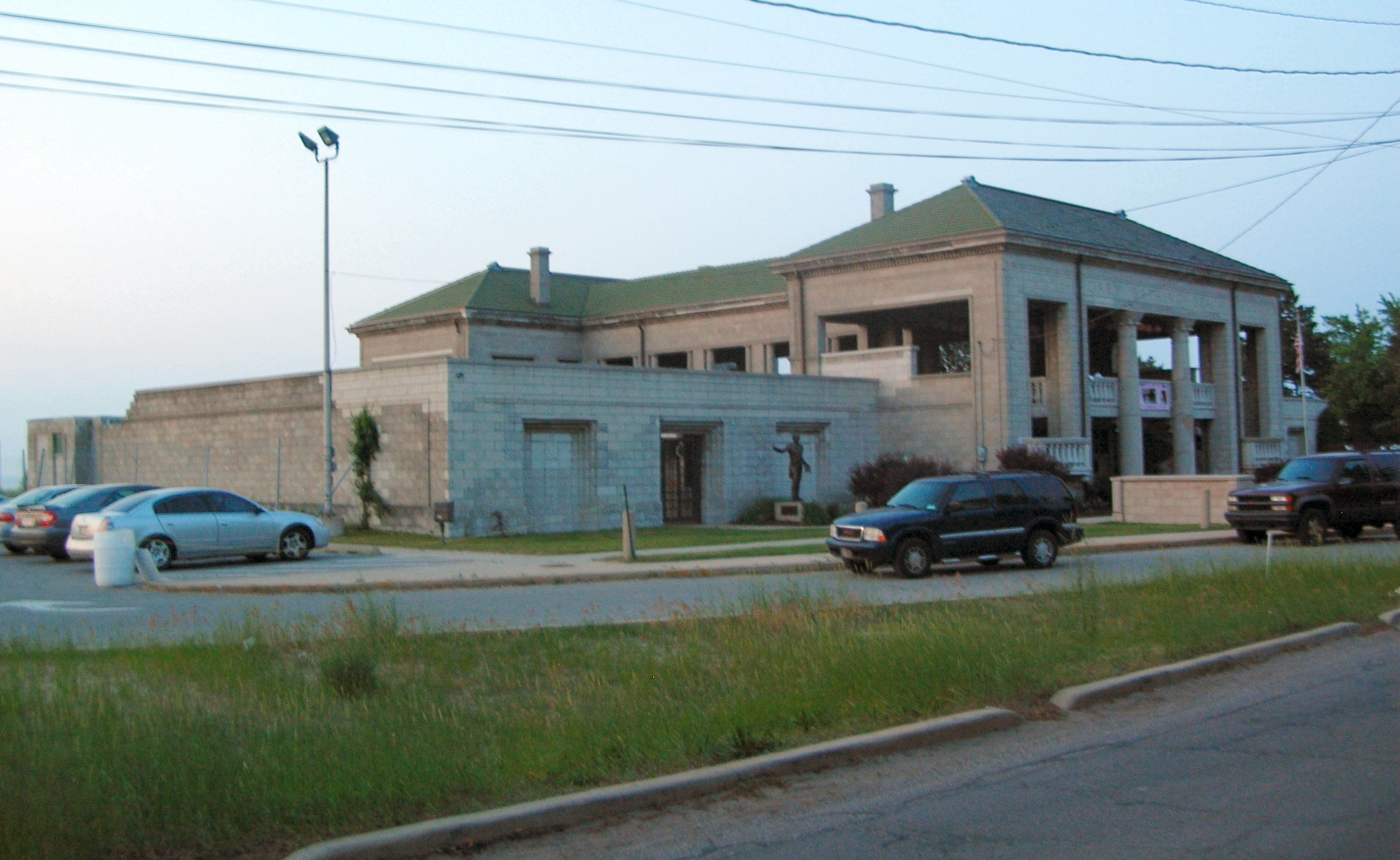

- Location within Indiana Location within the United States
- Location: One Marquette Dr., Marquette Park, Gary, Indiana
- Coordinates: 41°37′11″N 87°15′24″W
- Area: 6 acres (2.4 ha)
- Built: 1921
- Architect: George Washington Maher
- Architectural style: Prairie School, Classical Revival
- NRHP reference No.: 94001354
- Added to NRHP: November 25, 1994

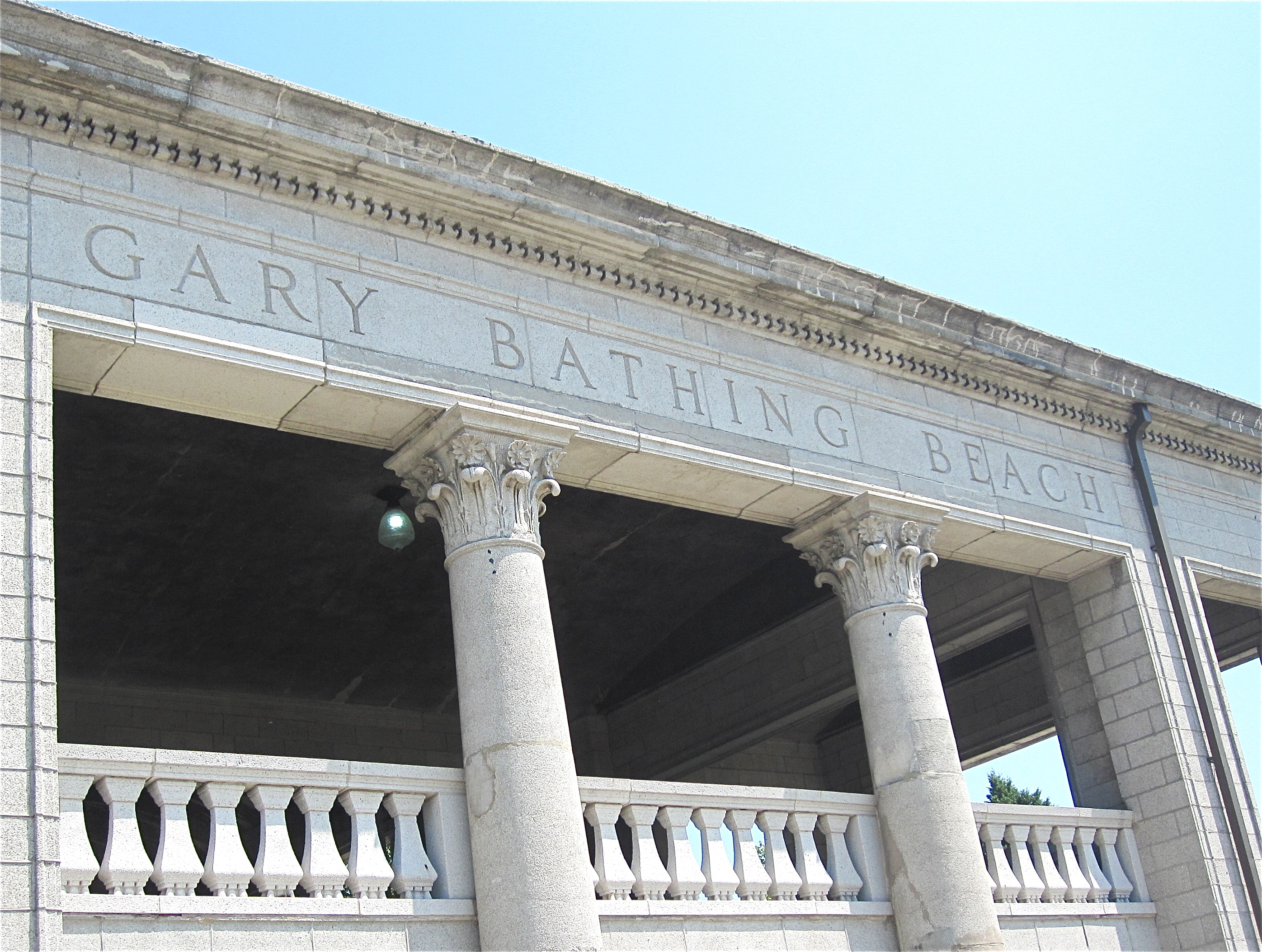
Lakefront Park Bathhouse/Aquatorium

Gary Bathing Beach Aquatorium, formerly known as Lakefront Park Bathhouse and also known as Chanute Aquatorium, is located at One Marquette Drive at Miller Beach in Marquette Park, Gary, Indiana. The aquatorium was designed by George Washington Maher and constructed in 1921. It was listed on the National Register of Historic Places on November 25, 1994. It has been converted to a museum of flight, honoring Octave Chanute and the Tuskegee Airmen.

It was built as a shower/bathroom/changing facility in 1921 and was dubbed the Lakefront Park Bathhouse. It was a major focal point of the Miller Beach community for decades. The building is architecturally significant as one of the earliest examples of pre-cast concrete modular construction. Ninety percent of the building is built with only six basic cast blocks, the most basic being the T-Block, a precursor of today's standard concrete block.

By the 1960s the facility was falling into major disrepair. In 1971 the building was closed to the public and boarded up.

The Aquatorium was rescued from demolition by the Chanute Aquatorium Society in 1991. The Society invented the word Aquatorium meaning "place to view the water" in order to disassociate the structure with the word bathhouse.

== Conversion to a museum of flight ==
No longer a place to change or shower, the building now serves as a museum honoring Octave Chanute, the father of flight. Chanute conducted some of the first heavier-than-air glider flights in human history in the high dunes just yards from the structure. His successful experiments and glider designs paved the way for the Wright brothers' powered flight at Kitty Hawk. The building also honors the Tuskegee Airmen, aeronautic pioneers who spearheaded the integration of the armed forces. Hundreds of thousands of dollars have been raised for the building's restoration and revamping.

Lee Construction Management of Miller was employed to begin restoration of the facility. In the spring of 1998, they demolished the east showers and began construction of new wing in January 1999. In the spring of 2000 major reconstruction of the second floor waterproofed the first-floor areas so museum space could be constructed below. The cornerstone for The Tuskegee Airmen Wing of the new museum was laid January 17, 1999.

== See also ==
- National Register of Historic Places listings in Lake County, Indiana
