= List of birds of the Indiana Dunes =

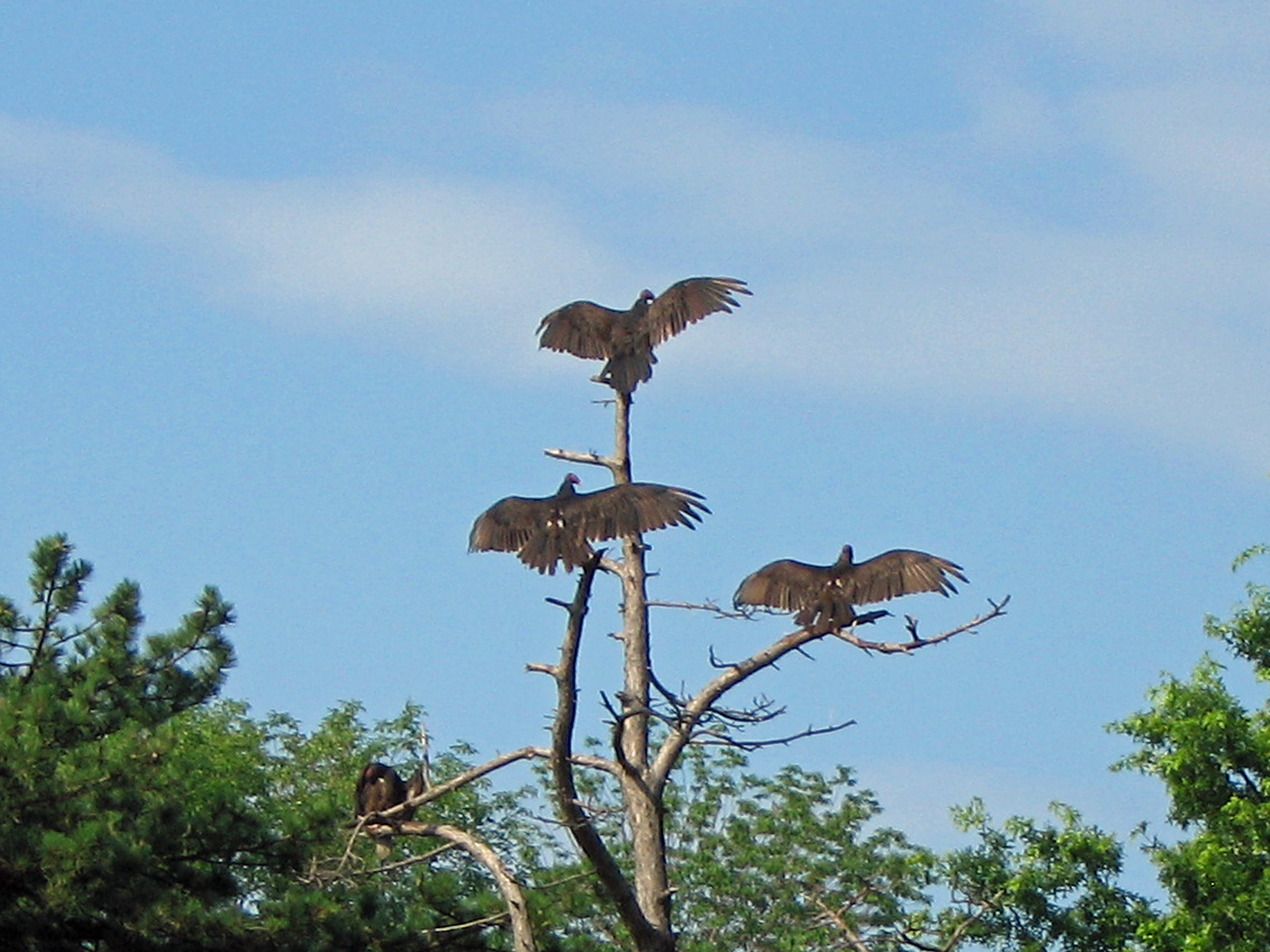
Turkey vultures at the Indiana Dunes

This is a list of birds of the Indiana Dunes.

The Indiana Dunes (state park and national park) protect over 15,000 acres (61 km^{2}) of dunes and shoreline. From the barren sand beaches to the inter-dunal ponds and the intervening forest, this area is inhabited by 271 identified species of birds.

Because the area forms part of the Mississippi Flyway, many more species of birds can be observed there during spring and fall migration times.

== Water birds ==
Common name	Season(s)	Habitat
Loons		
Common loon	common in the fall	along the lakeshore
Grebes		
Pied-billed grebe	spring through fall	marshes and ponds
Horned grebe	fall	lakeshore
Cormorants		
Double-crested cormorant	abundant in the fall	lakeshore
Bitterns and herons		
Great blue heron	common from spring to fall	marshes and ponds
Green heron	common from spring to fall	marshes and ponds
Black-crowned night heron	common in the spring	marshes
Least bittern	summer	marshes
Swans, geese and ducks		
Canada goose	abundant year round	lakeshore, marshes and ponds
Wood duck	common from spring to fall	swamps
American black duck	common in the spring and fall	lakeshore and marshes
Long-tailed duck	uncommon in the fall	lakeshore and ponds
Mallard	abundant year round	marshes and ponds
Blue-winged teal	common in spring and fall	marshes and ponds
Gadwall	common in spring and fall	marshes and ponds
American wigeon	common in spring and fall	marshes and ponds
Redhead	common in spring	lakeshore and ponds
Ring-necked duck	common in spring and fall	marshes and ponds
Lesser scaup	common in spring	lakeshore and ponds
Black scoter	uncommon in spring and fall	lakeshore
Common goldeneye	common in spring and fall	lakeshore
Bufflehead	common in spring and fall	lakeshore and ponds
Red-breasted merganser	common in spring and fall	lakeshore and ponds

== Birds of prey ==
Common name	Season(s)	Habitat
Vultures		
Turkey vulture	common in spring and summer	seen in flight
Hawks		
Sharp-shinned hawk	common in spring	seen in flight
Red-shouldered hawk	common in spring	seen in flight
Broad-winged hawk	common in spring	seen in flight
Red-tailed hawk	common all year	seen in flight
Falcons		
American kestrel	common in spring and fall	seen in flight

== Ground birds ==
Common name	Season(s)	Habitat
Bobwhite and pheasant		
Northern bobwhite	uncommon all year	wooded areas and fields
Rails and coots		
Sora	common in spring	marshes
American coot	common in summer	marshes and ponds
Cranes		
Sandhill crane	common in spring	usually seen in flight
Plovers		
Killdeer	common in summer and fall	marshes and dunes
Piping plover	rare in spring and summer	marshes and swamps
Sandpipers		
Solitary sandpiper	common in spring	marshes
Spotted sandpiper	common in spring and summer	marshes and swamps
Sanderling	common in summer	beaches
Semipalmated sandpiper	common in summer	beaches and ponds
Least sandpiper	common in spring and fall	beaches and ponds
Pectoral sandpiper	common in spring	marshes and ponds
Dunlin	common in summer	marshes and ponds
American woodcock	common in spring and summer	swamps and woods
Gulls and terns		
Bonaparte's Gull	common in spring and summer	lake and beach
Ring-billed gull	common in winter	lake and beach
Herring gull	common in fall	lake and beach
Caspian tern	common in spring and fall	lake and beach
Forster's tern	common in fall	lake and beach

== Perching birds ==
Common name	Season(s)	Habitat
Doves		
Mourning dove	common all year	woods and fields
Goatsuckers		
Common nighthawk	common in spring and summer	seen in flight
Swifts		
Chimney swift	common in spring through the fall	seen in flight
Hummingbirds		
Ruby-throated hummingbird	common in the fall	woods
Kingfishers		
Kingfishers	common in spring through the fall	marshes and ponds
Woodpeckers		
Red-headed woodpecker	common in spring through the fall	woods
Red-bellied woodpecker	common in spring and fall	woods
Downy woodpecker	summer	woods
Northern flicker	common in summer	woods
Flycatchers		
Eastern wood pewee	common in spring through the fall	woods
Acadian flycatcher	common in spring through the fall	woods
Willow flycatcher	common in spring	marshes
Least flycatcher	common in spring and summer	woods and wooded edges
Eastern phoebe	common in spring	fields, woods, and wooded edges
Great crested flycatcher	common in spring and summer	woods
Eastern kingbird	common in spring and summer	fields and marshes
Swallows		
Purple martin	common in spring through the fall	
Tree swallow	common in spring and summer	marshes
Bank swallow	common in spring and summer	fields
Barn swallow	common in spring through the fall	fields
Jays and crows		
Blue jay	abundant all year	woods
American crow	common all year	all areas
Titmice		
Black-capped chickadee	common all year	woods
Tufted titmouse	common all year	woods
Cuckoos		
Yellow-billed cuckoo	uncommon in summer	woods
Nuthatches		
Red-breasted nuthatch	uncommon to rare year round	woods
White-breasted nuthatch	common all year	woods
Creeper		
Brown creeper	common in spring and fall	woods
Wrens		
House wren	common spring through fall	woods
Marsh wren	common spring through fall	marshes
Old World warblers, thrushes and allies		
Golden-crowned kinglet	common spring and fall	woods
Ruby-crowned kinglet	common spring through fall	woods
Eastern bluebird	common spring	woods
Veery	common spring through fall	woods
Hermit thrush	common spring and fall	woods
Wood thrush	common spring and summer	woods
Swainson's thrush	uncommon in May and September	woods
American robin	spring through fall	fields
Mockingbirds and thrashers		
Gray catbird	common summer and fall	wooded edges
Brown thrasher	common spring	woods
Waxwing		
Cedar waxwing	common spring and fall	woods and marshes
Starlings		
European starling	common all year	common in all habitats
Vireos		
Yellow-throated vireo	common spring and summer	woods
Warbling vireo	common spring	wooded edges
Red-eyed vireo	common spring through fall	woods
Blue-headed vireo	common spring through summer	woods
Warblers		
Blue-winged warbler	common spring	wooded edges
Tennessee warbler	common spring and fall	woods
Golden-winged warbler	common spring and summer	woods
Nashville warbler	common spring and fall	woods
Yellow warbler	common summer	wooded edges and marshes
Chestnut-sided warbler	common spring	wooded edges and woods
Magnolia warbler	common spring and fall	woods
Cape May warbler	common spring and summer	woods
Black-throated green warbler	common spring and fall	woods
Blackburnian warbler	common spring	woods
Palm warbler	common spring and fall	wooded edges and marshes
Bay-breasted warbler	common spring and fall	woods
Blackpoll warbler	common spring and fall	woods
Cerulean warbler	common spring and summer	woods
Black and white warbler	common spring and fall	woods
American redstart	common summer and fall	woods
Ovenbird	common spring and summer	woods
Northern waterthrush	common spring and fall	wooded edges and marshes
Common yellowthroat	common fall	marshes
Wilson's warbler	common spring and summer	woods
Canada warbler	common spring	woods
Tanager		
Scarlet tanager	common spring and summer	woods
Cardinal and buntings		
Northern cardinal	common all year	woody edges
Rose-breasted grosbeak	common from spring through fall	woods
Indigo bunting	common spring and summer	woody edges
Sparrows		
Eastern towhee previously the rufous-sided towhee	common spring through autumn	woody edges
American tree sparrow	common in spring and fall	woody edges, fields and dunes
Chipping sparrow	common from spring through fall	woody edges, fields and dunes
Field sparrow	common spring and summer	fields, dunes and marshes
Fox sparrow	common spring and autumn	woody edges
Song sparrow	common in spring through fall	woody edges, marshes
Swamp sparrow	common from spring through fall	marshes
White-throated sparrow	common spring and fall	woody edges
Dark-eyed junco	abundant except in the summer	woody edges
Bobolink	common in spring	fields
Blackbirds and orioles		
Red-winged blackbird	abundant from spring through autumn	marshes
Eastern meadowlark	common from spring through autumn	fields
Common grackle	abundant from spring through autumn	marshes and fields
Brown-headed cowbird	common in spring and summer	woods
Baltimore oriole or northern oriole	common in spring and summer	woods
Finches		
Purple finch	common in spring and autumn	woods
House finch	abundant all year	urban
American goldfinch	common all year	woody edges and fields
Weaver finches		
House sparrow	abundant all year	urban

== Where to see birds ==
For more details about each habitat type, see Habitats of the Indiana Dunes.

=== Lake and beaches ===
There are several points of access to the beaches of Lake Michigan. From east to west, they are: Central Avenue; Lakeview (Beverly Shores); Kemil Road Beach (west end of Beverly Shores); Indiana Dunes State Park (admission fee); Cowles Bog Trail (2.5 miles (4.0 km) walk with a climb); West Beach (admission fee); Wells Street Beach (parking fee); Marquette Park; Lake Street Beach.

=== Dunes ===
Mt. Baldy (steep climb); Indiana Dunes State Park (admission fee); West Beach (admission fee).

=== Fields ===
The Calumet Bike Trail traverses the length of the park along the South Shore Tracks, with parking at several points, including the Mineal Springs Road, U.S. 12 in the Pines. The Chellberg Farm off Mineral Springs Road and U.S. 20 has several cultivated fields.

=== Woods ===
Indiana Dunes State Park, trails #9 and #10; the Ly-Co-Ki-We horsetrail, U.S. 20; Miller Woods on Lake Street in Gary; and The Bailly/Chellberg trail in Porter

=== Ponds ===
Long Lake is easy to reach from West Beach, of Lake/Porter County Line Road. Miller Woods is dotted with ponds.

=== Marsh ===
The Great Marsh stretches from Dune Acres (off Mineral Springs Road, east, to East State Park Road (Kemil Rd).

=== Swamps ===
The restoration of the Great Marsh in Beverly Shores along Beverly drive (east and west of Broadway). Trail #2 in the State Park traverses a large area of swamp.

=== Conifers, wooded edges ===
These are most difficult as they are scattered throughout the other habitats and do not dominate any single area.

== See also ==
- List of birds of Indiana
