= Octave Chanute =

American civil engineer and aviation pioneer, born in France

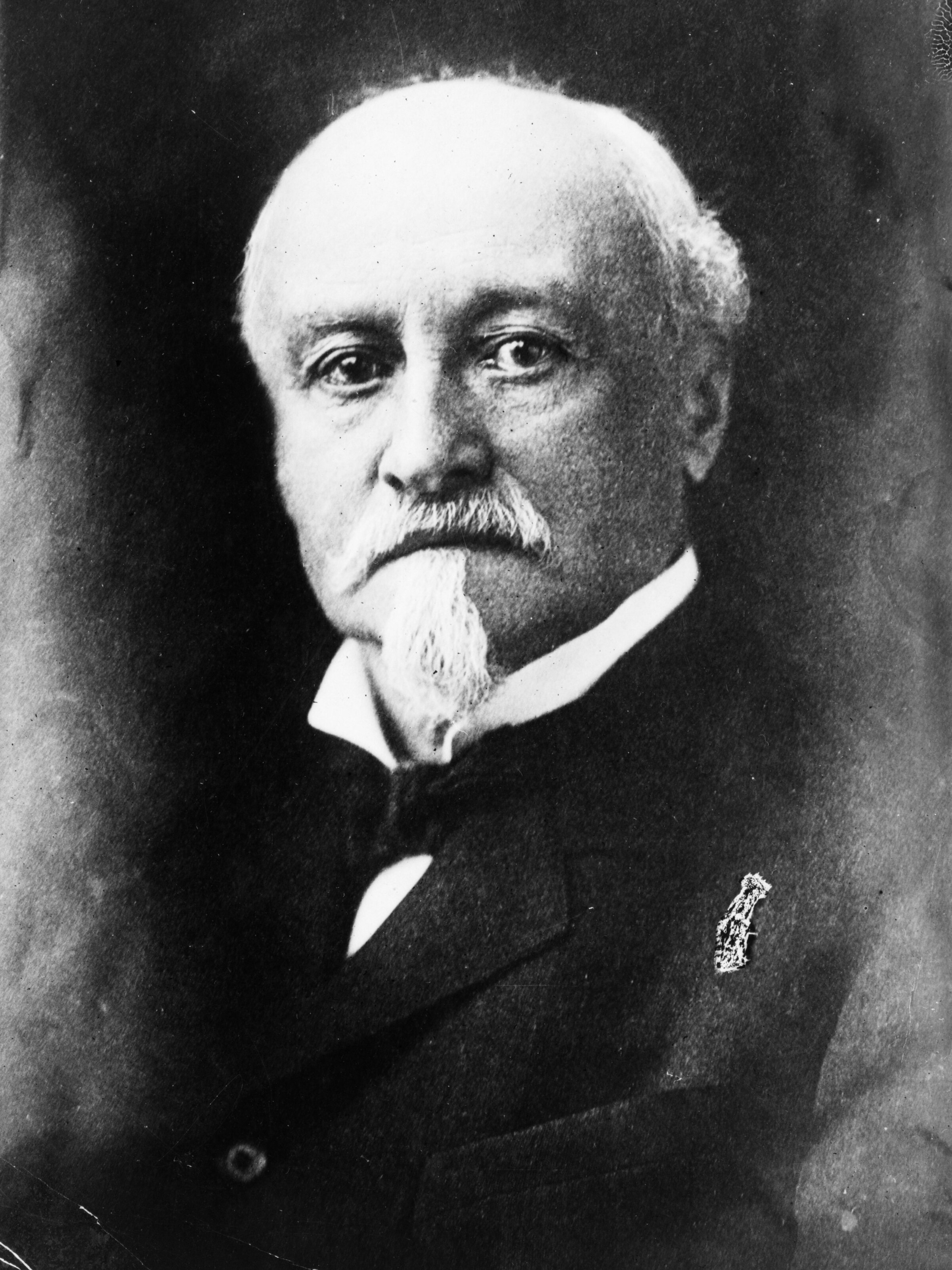
- Chanute between 1900 and 1910
- Born: 18 February 1832; Paris, Kingdom of France
- Died: 23 November 1910 (aged 78); Chicago, Illinois, US
- Resting place: Springdale Cemetery, Peoria, Illinois
- Citizenship: French, American
- Occupations: Civil engineer, railway engineer and bridge designer, aviation pioneer

Octave Chanute (February 18, 1832 – November 23, 1910) was a French-American civil engineer and aviation pioneer. He advised and publicized many aviation enthusiasts, including the Wright brothers. At his death, he was hailed as the father of aviation and the initial concepts of the heavier-than-air flying machine.

== Early life ==
Octave Alexandre Chanut was born in Paris to Elise and Joseph Chanut, professor at the Collège de France. Octave and Joseph emigrated to the United States of America in 1838, when Joseph was named Vice President of Jefferson College in Louisiana. Moving to New York City, Octave attended private schools. He added the "e" to his last name when he applied for American Citizenship. In 1857, he married Anne Riddell James, with whom he had a son and three daughters.

== Career ==
=== Railroad civil engineer ===
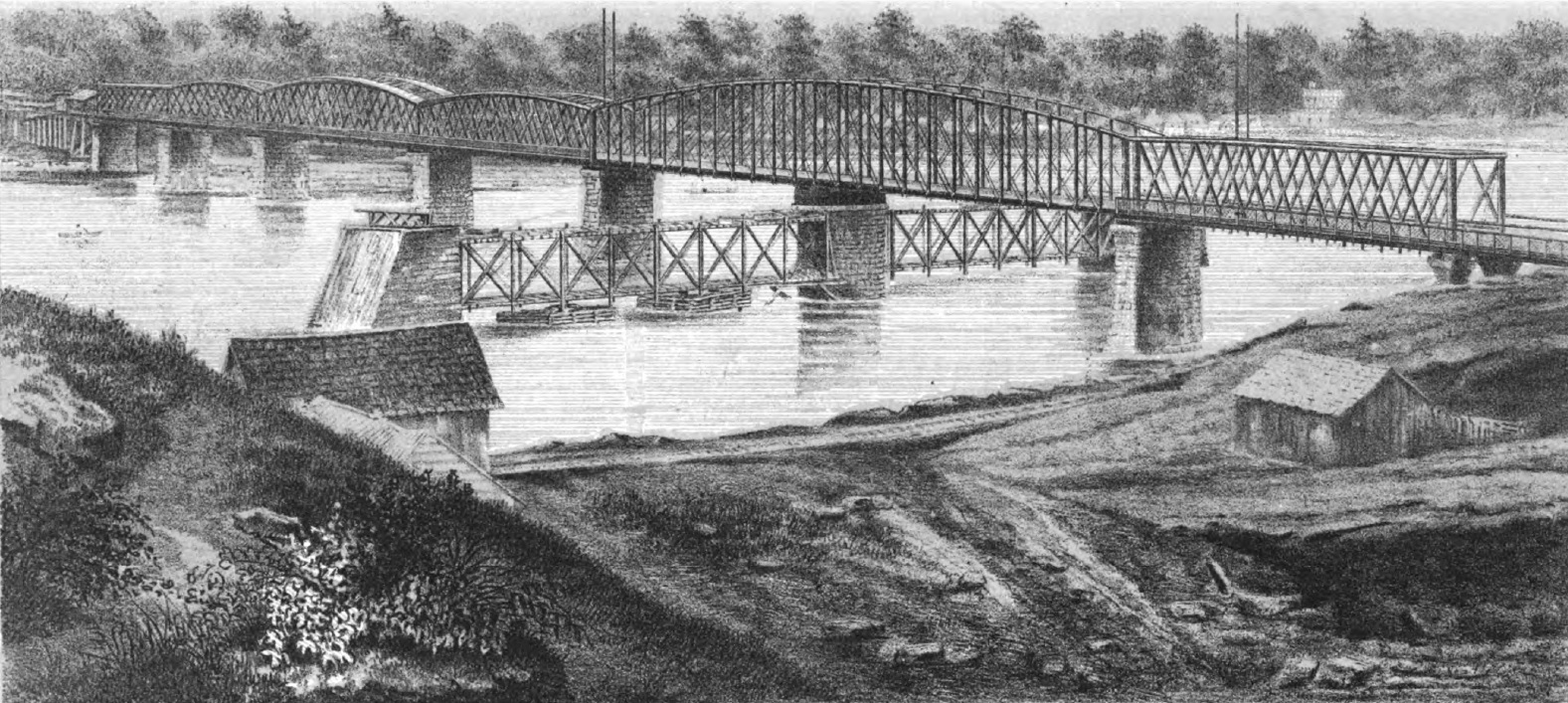
Hannibal Bridge, 1869

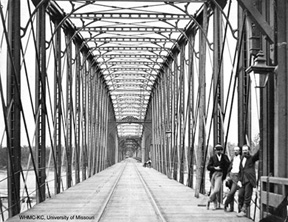
Chanute stands in the middle of the Hannibal Bridge in 1869.

Chanute began his training as a civil engineer in 1848. He was widely considered brilliant and innovative in the engineering profession. He designed and constructed the two biggest stockyards in the United States, Chicago Stock Yards (1865) and Kansas City Stockyards (1871). He designed and built the Hannibal Bridge with Joseph Tomlinson and George S. Morison. In 1869, this bridge established Kansas City, Missouri, as the dominant city in the region, as the first bridge to cross the Missouri River there. He designed many other bridges during his railroad career, including the Illinois River rail bridge at Peoria, Illinois, and Chillicothe, Illinois, the Genesee River Gorge rail bridge near Portageville, New York (now in Letchworth State Park), the Sibley Railroad Bridge across the Missouri River at Sibley, Missouri, the Fort Madison Toll Bridge at Fort Madison, Iowa, and the Kinzua Bridge in Pennsylvania.

=== Pioneer in wood preservation ===
Chanute established a procedure for pressure-treating wooden railroad ties with an antiseptic that increased the wood's lifespan. Establishing the first commercial plants, he convinced railroad men that it was advantageous to expend funds treating ties to extend their service life, thus reducing replacement costs. To monitor the longevity of railroad ties and other wooden items, he introduced the railroad date nail in the United States. Chanute was chief engineer of the Erie Railway from 1873, and resigned in 1883 to become an independent engineering consultant.

=== Aviation pioneer ===
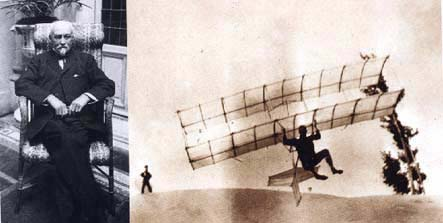
Chanute's 1896 biplane hang glider was a trailblazing design adapted by the Wright brothers, who "contrived a system consisting of two large surfaces on the Chanute double-deck plan".

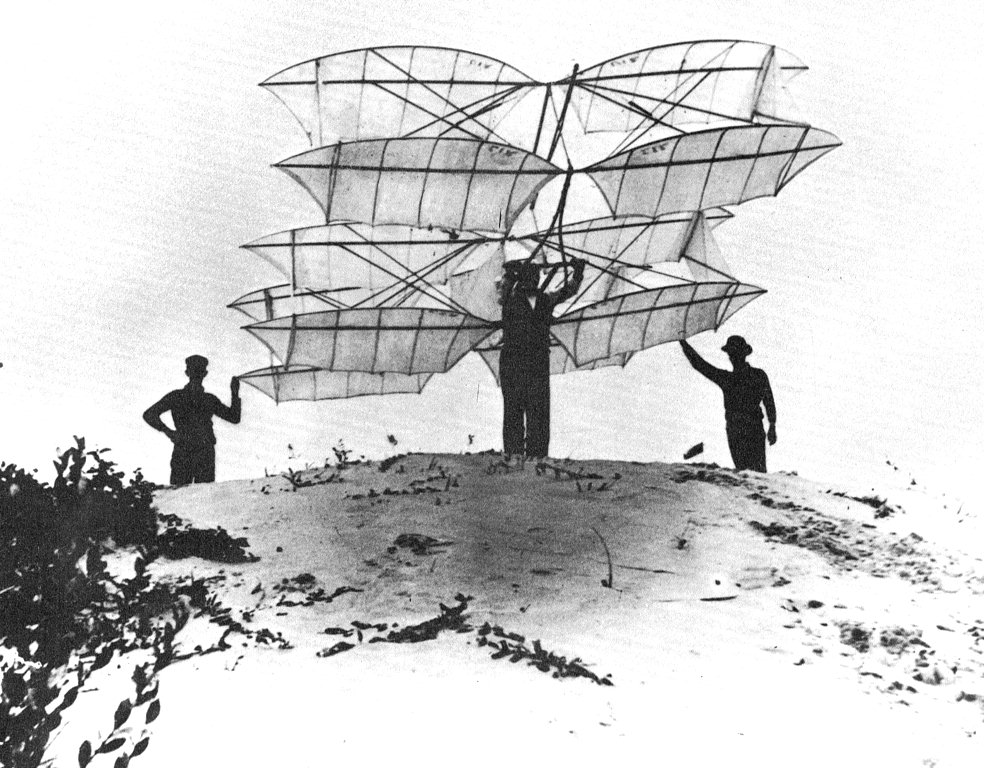
Chanute designed a twelve-winged glider, prepared for launch from the dunes of Miller Beach in 1896.

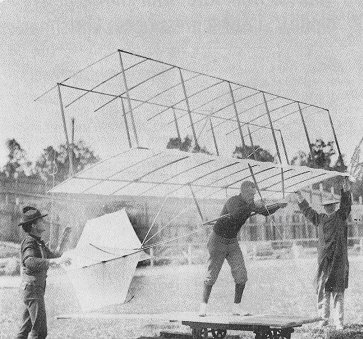
William Avery at the St. Louis World's Fair in 1904, about to launch a glider designed by Chanute.

...let us hope that the advent of a successful flying machine, now only dimly foreseen and nevertheless thought to be possible, will bring nothing but good into the world; that it shall abridge distance, make all parts of the globe accessible, bring men into closer relation with each other, advance civilization, and hasten the promised era in which there shall be nothing but peace and good-will among all men.

Chanute became interested in aviation after watching a balloon ascend in Peoria, Illinois, in 1856. When he retired from his railroad career in 1883, he devoted some leisure time to furthering the new science of aviation. Applying his engineering background, Chanute collected all available data from flight experimenters around the world and combined it with the knowledge gathered as a civil engineer in the past. He published his findings in a series of articles in The Railroad and Engineering Journal from 1891 to 1893, which were then re-published in the influential book Progress in Flying Machines in 1894. This was the most systematic global survey of fixed-wing heavier-than-air aviation research published up to that time.

At the World's Columbian Exposition in Chicago in 1893, Chanute collaborated with Albert Zahm to organize a highly successful International Conference on Aerial Navigation.

Being 64 years old, Chanute was too old to fly, so he partnered with younger experimenters, including Augustus M. Herring and William Avery. In 1896, Chanute, Herring, and Avery tested a design based on the work of German aviation pioneer Otto Lilienthal, and of hang gliders of their own design. The testing was in the dunes along the shore of Lake Michigan near the town of Miller Beach, Indiana, just east of what became the city of Gary. These experiments convinced Chanute that the best way to achieve extra lift without a prohibitive increase in weight was to stack several wings, an idea proposed by the British engineer Francis Herbert Wenham in 1866 and realized in flight by Lilienthal in the 1890s. Chanute introduced the "strut-wire" braced wing structure that was used in powered biplanes of the future, not seriously challenged until the pioneering efforts of Hugo Junkers to develop all-metal cantilever airframe technology without external bracing from 1915 onward. Chanute based his "interplane strut" concept on the Pratt truss, which was familiar to him from his bridge-building work. The Wright brothers based their glider designs on the Chanute "double-decker", as they called it. An updated and improved design of a biplane glider was developed and flown in 1897.

Chanute corresponded with many aviation pioneers, including Otto Lilienthal, Louis Pierre Mouillard, Gabriel Voisin, John J. Montgomery, Louis Blériot, Ferdinand Ferber, Lawrence Hargrave, and Alberto Santos Dumont. In 1897, he started a correspondence with British aviator Percy Pilcher. Following Chanute's ideas, Pilcher built a triplane, but he was killed in a glider crash in October 1899 before he could attempt to fly it.

In 1899, Wilbur Wright read Progress in Flying Machines and contacted Chanute in May 1900. Chanute helped to publicize the Wright brothers' work and provided input and consistent encouragement, visiting their camp near Kitty Hawk, North Carolina, in 1901, 1902, and 1903. The Wrights and Chanute exchanged hundreds of letters between 1900 and 1910.

Chanute freely shared his knowledge about aviation with anyone who was interested, and expected others to do the same. He encouraged colleagues to patent their inventions. His open approach led to friction with the Wright brothers, who believed their ideas about aircraft control were unique and refused to share them. Chanute did not believe that the Wright flying machine patent, premised on wing warping, could be enforced and said so publicly, including a newspaper interview in which he said, "I admire the Wrights. I feel friendly toward them for the marvels they have achieved, but you can easily gauge how I feel concerning their attitude at present by the remark I made to Wilbur Wright recently. I told him I was sorry to see they were suing other experimenters and abstaining from entering the contests and competitions in which other men are brilliantly winning laurels. I told him that in my opinion they are wasting valuable time over lawsuits which they ought to concentrate in their work. Personally, I do not think that the courts will hold that the principle underlying the warping tips can be patented." The friendship was still impaired when Chanute died, but Wilbur Wright attended Chanute's memorial service at the family's home. Wright wrote a eulogy that was read at the Aero Club meeting in January 1911.

When the Aero Club of Illinois was founded on February 10, 1910, Chanute was its first president until his death.

== Death ==
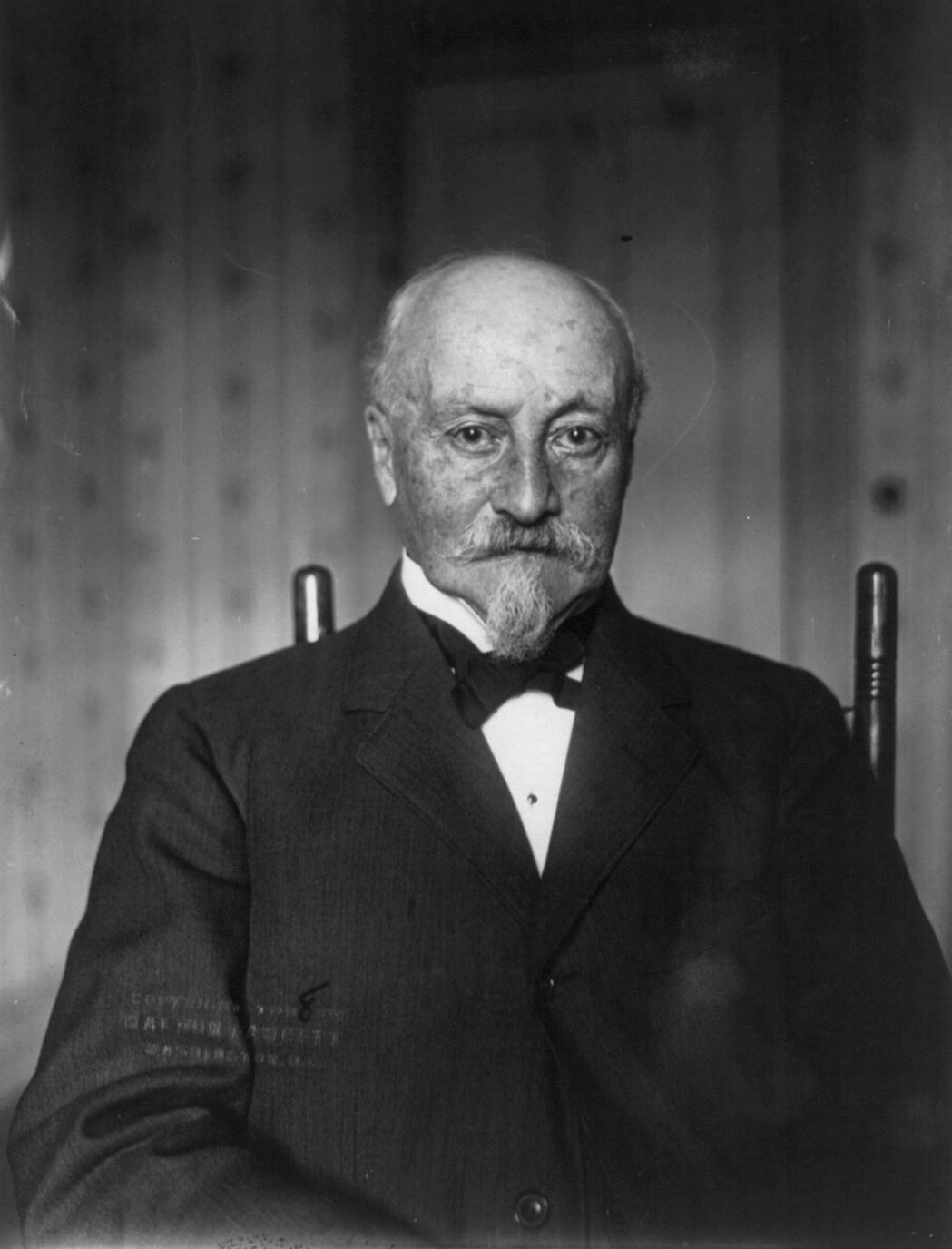
Octave Chanute, 1908

Chanute died on November 23, 1910, in Chicago, Illinois, after battling pneumonia. Wilbur Wright attended his memorial service to honor him.

== Commemoration ==
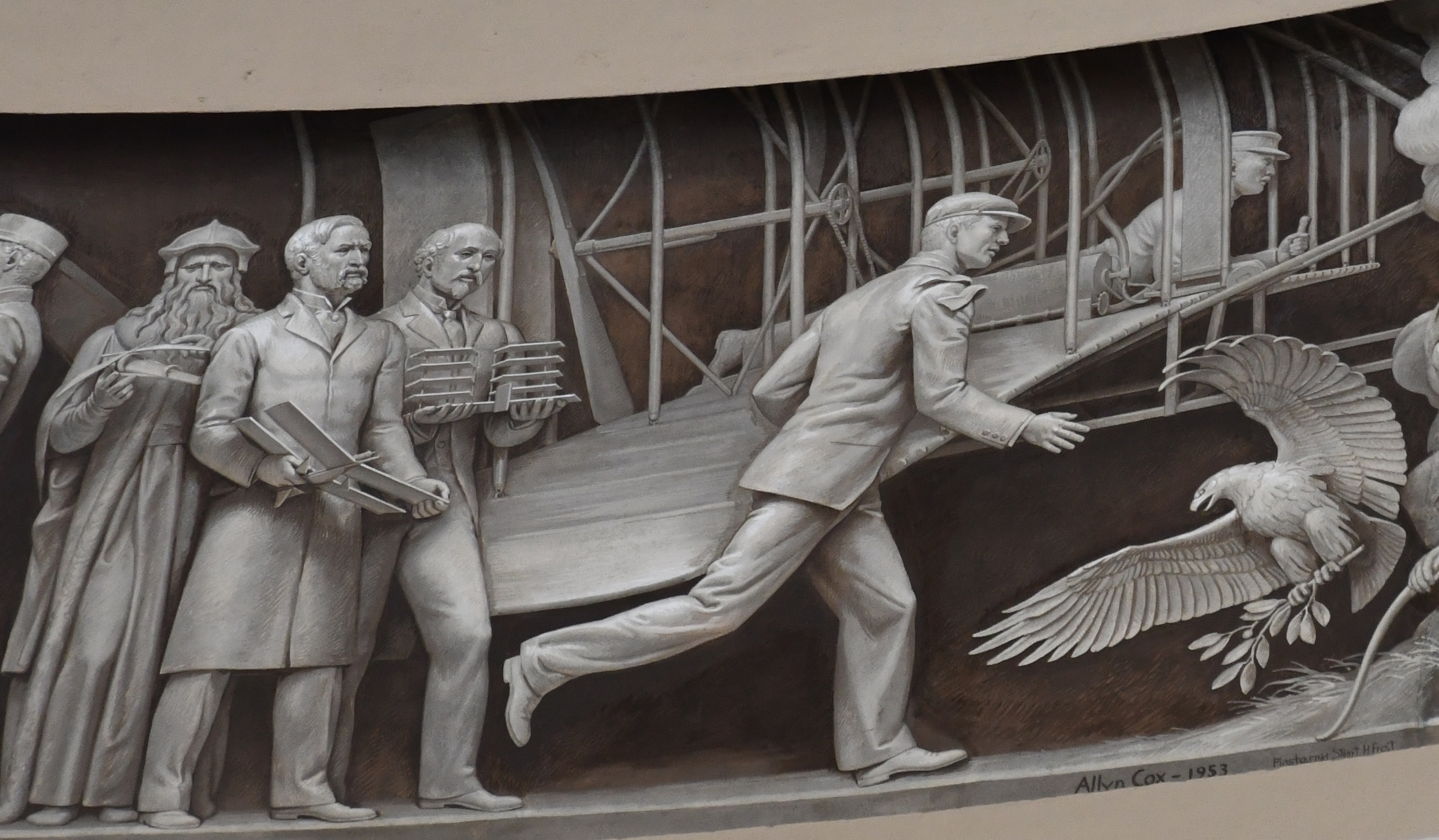
The Frieze of American History detail The Birth of Aviation is displayed in the U.S. Capitol Rotunda, and depicts Leonardo da Vinci, Samuel Langley, Octave Chanute, the Wright Brothers, and their pioneering Wright Flyer.

The town of Chanute, Kansas, is named after Chanute. Three small towns in southeast Kansas were vying for the railroad's land office and Chanute suggested that they incorporate, to make the larger town more attractive to the railroad.

The former Chanute Air Force Base near Rantoul, Illinois, was started in 1917 by the U.S. Army as Chanute Field. The base was decommissioned in 1993 and converted to peacetime endeavors. One of these endeavors was the now-closed Octave Chanute Aerospace Museum, which detailed the history of Chanute Air Force Base and of aviation in general, and included a replica of Chanute's 1896 glider. The location of the base is now the Chanute Field Historic District, and is listed on the National Register of Historic Places.

In 1902, the Western Society of Engineers began to present the Octave Chanute Award for papers of merit on engineering innovations. From 1939 to 2005, the American Institute of Aeronautics and Astronautics presented the Chanute Flight Award for an outstanding contribution made by a pilot or test personnel to the advancement of the art, science, and technology of aeronautics. The award was reactivated a few years later and is being awarded again (2026).

In 1963, Chanute was inducted into the National Aviation Hall of Fame in Dayton, Ohio.

In 1974, Chanute was inducted into the International Air & Space Hall of Fame.

In 1979, the U.S. Postal Service commemorated Chanute with a pair of 21-cent airmail stamps.

In 1996, the National Soaring Museum honored the 100th anniversary of the glider flying experiments in the sand dunes along Lake Michigan as National Landmark of Soaring No. 8.

Embry-Riddle Aeronautical University, Daytona Beach, in Daytona Beach, Florida, has an off-campus residence hall, the Chanute Complex, for upper-class students.

The Gary Bathing Beach Aquatorium, in Gary, Indiana, houses a mini-museum dedicated to both Octave Chanute and the Tuskegee Airmen. The historic bathing pavilion was designed by architect George Washington Maher.

Chanute is represented in the Frieze of American History detail The Birth of Aviation, in the U.S. Capitol Rotunda in Washington DC.

== Patents ==
=== U.S. patents ===
- U.S. patent 61,397, Rolling Track Irons
- U.S. patent 98,848, Dredging Machine (Octave Chanute & George S. Morrison)
- U.S. patent 430,068, Preserving timber structure
- U.S. patent 582,718, Soaring Machine
- U.S. patent 582,757, Means for Aerial Flight, Chanute filed the patent on behalf of Louis Mouillard, with one-half assigned to Chanute.
- U.S. patent 606,187, Soaring Machine, William Paul Butusov, Chanute collaborated and paid for the patent process and was assigned one-half.
- U.S. patent 688,932, Process of Preserving Wood
- U.S. patent 834,658, Means for Aerial Flight (or glider launcher).

=== U.K. patents ===
- 13372 (flying machine, c. 1897)
- 13373 (flying machine, c. 1897)
- 15221 (flying machine, c. 1897)

=== Canadian patents ===
- 34507, Process of Preserving Wood Artificially against Decay

== Timeline ==
Timeline

== See also ==
- Octave Chanute Award
- The "Pioneer Era" (1900–1914) of Aviation history

== Bibliography ==
- Text of Progress in Flying Machines
- Progress in Flying Machines By Octave Chanute, Courier Dover Publications, reprint 1997 of 1894 original. At Google books.
- World Book Encyclopedia
- Octave Chanute, 1832-1910. Obituary in Flight. 3 December 1910
- Simine Short. 2011. Locomotive to Aeromotive: Octave Chanute and the Transportation Revolution. University of Illinois Press. OCLC 785781240
- Simine Short: Flight Not Improbable. Octave Chanute and the Worldwide Race Toward Flight. Springer Biographies, Cham 2023. ISBN 978-3-031-24429-2
