= LaSalle County Nuclear Generating Station =

Nuclear power plant in LaSalle County, Illinois, United States

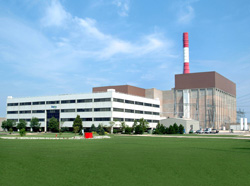
- LaSalle County Nuclear Generating Station NRC Image
- Official name: LaSalle County Generating Station
- Country: United States
- Location: Brookfield Township, LaSalle County, near Marseilles, Illinois
- Coordinates: 41°14′44″N 88°40′9″W
- Status: Operational
- Construction began: September 10, 1973
- Commission date: Unit 1: October 20, 1982; Unit 2: October 19, 1984
- Owner: Constellation Energy
- Operator: Constellation Energy

Nuclear power station
- Reactor type: BWR
- Reactor supplier: General Electric
- Cooling source: LaSalle Lake
- Thermal capacity: 2 × 3546 MW_{th}

Power generation
- Units operational: 1 × 1137 MW; 1 × 1140 MW
- Make and model: BWR-5 (Mark 2 Containment)
- Nameplate capacity: 2277 MW
- Capacity factor: 94.79% (2017); 79.25% (lifetime)
- Annual net output: 18,908 GWh (2017)

External links
- Website: LaSalle County Nuclear Generating Station

LaSalle County Nuclear Generating Station, located in Brookfield Township, LaSalle County, Illinois, near Marseilles, 11 miles (18 km) southeast of Ottawa, serves Chicago and Northern Illinois with electricity. The plant is owned and operated by Constellation Energy following separation from Exelon Corporation in 2022. Its Units 1 and 2 began commercial operation in October 1982, and October 1984, respectively.

It has two General Electric boiling water reactors. LaSalle's Unit 1 and Unit 2 together produce 2,320 megawatts, which is enough electricity for the needs of 2.3 million American homes. Instead of cooling towers, the station has a 2,058-acre (833 ha) man-made cooling lake, which is also a popular fishery — LaSalle Lake State Fish and Wildlife Area — managed by the Illinois Department of Natural Resources.

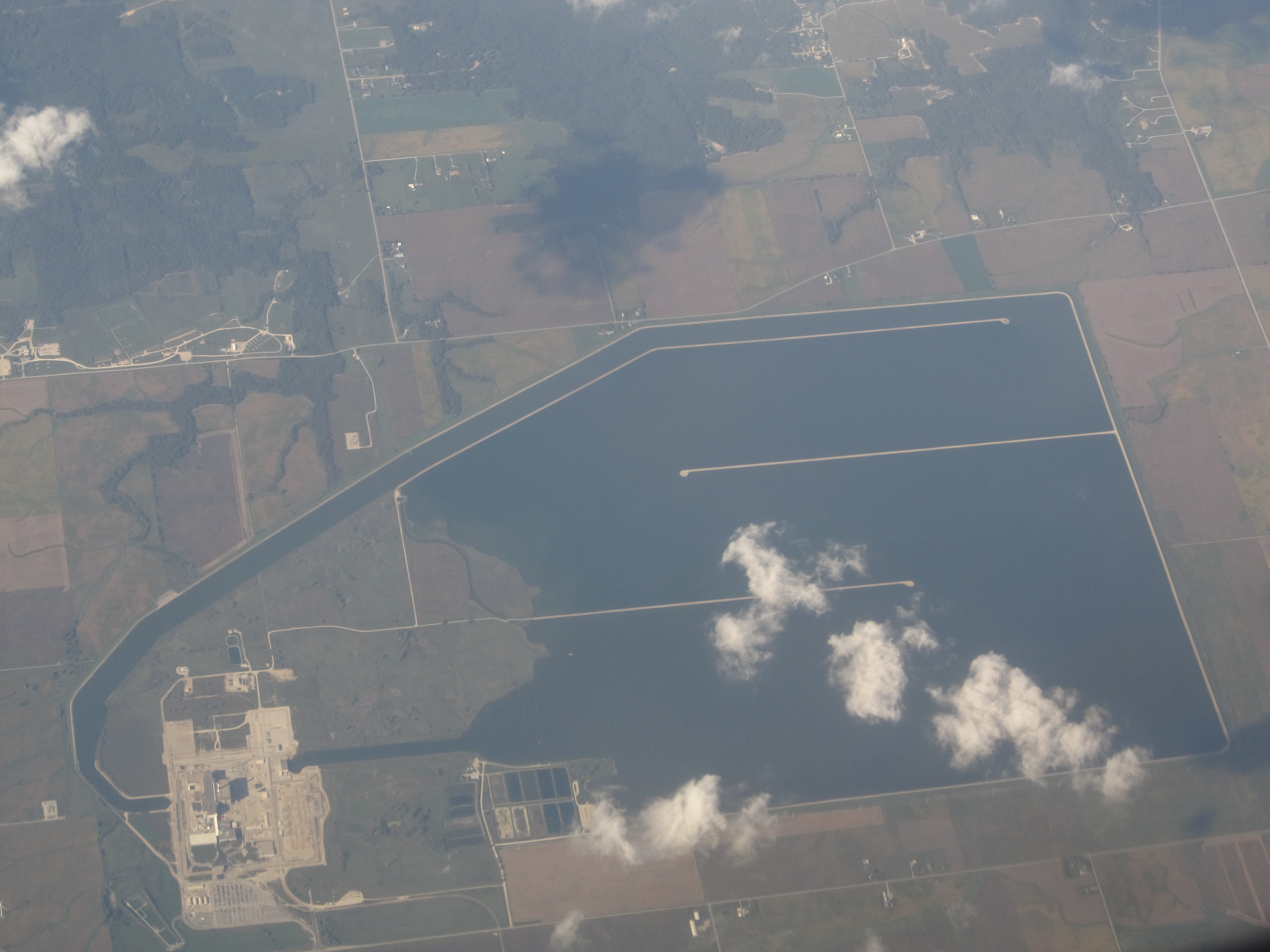
The plant and its man-made lake viewed from an aircraft

The nuclear plant is connected to the BNSF rail network through a branch line from Ransom, Illinois.

== Surrounding population ==
The Nuclear Regulatory Commission defines two emergency planning zones around nuclear power plants: a plume exposure pathway zone with a radius of 10 miles (16 km), concerned primarily with exposure to, and inhalation of, airborne radioactive contamination, and an ingestion pathway zone of about 50 miles (80 km), concerned primarily with ingestion of food and liquid contaminated by radioactivity.

The 2010 U.S. population within 10 miles (16 km) of LaSalle was 17,643, an increase of 7.1 percent in a decade, according to an analysis of U.S. Census data for msnbc.com. The 2010 U.S. population within 50 miles (80 km) was 1,902,775, an increase of 22.6 percent since 2000. Cities within 50 miles include Joliet (34 miles to city center).

== Incidents ==
On March 9, 1988, Reactor 2 of the Lasalle NPP experienced an incident that resulted in core power instability. Due to a valving error during maintenance by the staff, water entered the sensors monitoring the water level in the core. This led to miscalculations of the water level in the core, leading to a trip of the recirculation pumps and later, the failure of the feed water preheaters, resulting in confusion among the operators and oscillations of the reactor power until the reactor automatically scrammed when the neutron flux in the core reached 118% of the maximum. This was regarded as one of the most serious nuclear incidents in the USA. The NRC later published a bulletin regarding the incident and precautions to be taken.

On February 20, 2006, a "site area emergency" was declared at the plant at 12:28 AM. This was the first SAE declared at a US nuclear plant since 1991. Workers were shutting down Unit 1 for refueling when the plant's turbine control system malfunctioned, scramming the reactor. The reactor had been operating at 6 percent power output at the time. Plant instruments indicated three of 185 control rods used to shut down the reactor were not fully inserted triggering the emergency declaration. After a reset, the plant's instruments indicated that only one control rod was not fully inserted, not three. The emergency ended at 4:27 AM with no damage or release of radioactivity.

Post trip evaluations have confirmed that all control rods were fully inserted within four minutes of the reactor SCRAM. A review indicates the problem was with the indication sensors, and that all control rods were fully inserted immediately at the time of the reactor scram. Follow-up evaluations also demonstrated that even if the three subject control rods remained fully withdrawn in a cold shutdown condition, the reactor would have remained adequately shutdown.

== Seismic risk ==
The Nuclear Regulatory Commission's estimate of the risk each year of an earthquake intense enough to cause core damage to the reactor at LaSalle was 1 in 357,143, according to an NRC study published in August 2010.

== Electricity production ==
Generation (MWh) of LaSalle Generating Station
Year	Jan	Feb	Mar	Apr	May	Jun	Jul	Aug	Sep	Oct	Nov	Dec	Annual (Total)
2001	1,719,906	1,430,802	1,726,371	1,583,577	1,618,813	1,656,447	1,667,448	1,668,346	1,454,565	1,305,808	1,639,620	1,670,311	19,142,014
2002	1,048,320	1,303,448	1,737,647	1,198,966	1,439,437	1,638,862	1,671,292	1,609,356	1,596,064	1,507,327	1,465,012	1,707,453	17,923,184
2003	1,221,039	955,132	1,642,365	1,620,797	1,660,966	1,651,144	1,520,692	1,662,598	1,545,582	1,699,937	1,562,890	1,672,837	18,415,979
2004	1,173,865	1,244,289	1,708,196	1,649,999	1,684,687	1,543,318	1,670,049	1,676,479	1,607,626	1,702,092	1,637,456	1,693,904	18,991,960
2005	1,701,544	924,250	1,243,173	1,644,514	1,682,247	1,606,502	1,646,412	1,656,701	1,587,797	1,666,369	1,651,246	1,702,903	18,713,658
2006	1,705,138	1,287,650	1,200,375	1,648,219	1,657,791	1,619,798	1,660,067	1,659,683	1,620,205	1,702,107	1,648,971	1,697,807	19,107,811
2007	1,689,302	1,385,889	1,212,620	1,651,728	1,684,472	1,583,910	1,657,561	1,652,239	1,613,200	1,689,614	1,585,999	1,573,602	18,980,136
2008	1,481,454	862,805	1,653,909	1,657,292	1,693,554	1,632,500	1,668,512	1,664,467	1,549,476	1,631,809	1,662,722	1,690,064	18,848,564
2009	1,353,192	1,257,652	1,704,567	1,658,327	1,559,546	1,608,575	1,546,233	1,547,030	1,611,616	1,599,877	1,650,144	1,711,989	18,808,748
2010	1,683,065	959,446	1,523,539	1,653,041	1,690,466	1,610,432	1,645,171	1,630,565	1,622,345	1,712,651	1,674,488	1,727,359	19,132,568
2011	1,724,944	829,924	1,516,381	1,682,247	1,699,146	1,654,166	1,675,592	1,669,504	1,657,000	1,729,051	1,687,055	1,731,350	19,256,360
2012	1,734,597	1,147,439	1,510,841	1,683,211	1,712,903	1,647,891	1,676,551	1,689,868	1,645,273	1,736,682	1,686,082	1,723,661	19,594,999
2013	1,674,324	1,025,207	1,621,003	954,261	1,695,877	1,654,763	1,690,566	1,691,404	1,608,025	1,726,399	1,689,718	1,728,614	18,760,161
2014	1,737,287	1,007,668	1,683,666	1,568,452	1,526,053	1,652,096	1,701,950	1,334,903	1,651,161	1,458,474	1,692,554	1,740,435	18,754,699
2015	1,746,319	815,034	1,252,039	1,684,221	1,673,159	1,621,874	1,683,599	1,432,598	1,618,308	1,732,702	1,686,399	1,740,117	18,686,369
2016	1,721,346	1,172,859	1,170,724	1,680,679	1,721,455	1,522,004	1,682,991	1,676,233	1,641,904	1,727,089	1,684,284	1,742,512	19,144,080
2017	1,652,790	745,024	1,477,284	1,681,581	1,726,287	1,443,848	1,686,930	1,692,181	1,643,335	1,728,664	1,689,473	1,741,062	18,908,459
2018	1,744,824	1,273,899	1,226,979	1,680,521	1,708,708	1,640,803	1,682,316	1,680,977	1,554,530	1,730,644	1,687,094	1,734,471	19,345,766
2019	1,684,758	1,191,576	1,446,068	1,683,785	1,729,058	1,651,282	1,671,185	1,687,784	1,644,067	1,728,685	1,689,639	1,627,368	19,435,255
2020	1,691,513	1,064,030	1,739,345	1,683,521	1,719,077	1,645,874	1,661,558	1,681,468	1,649,862	1,732,431	1,685,939	1,741,066	19,695,684
2021	1,710,653	1,300,131	865,774	1,127,508	1,718,562	1,639,674	1,677,899	1,677,296	1,643,350	1,721,082	1,682,391	1,740,425	18,504,745
2022	1,694,657	1,285,946	1,247,406	1,681,422	1,722,403	1,647,885	1,623,009	1,689,630	1,493,362	1,702,973	1,686,650	1,741,633	19,216,976
2023	1,718,364	1,091,933	1,486,575	1,660,368	1,703,210	1,641,920	1,678,637	1,683,738	1,639,926	1,723,791	1,680,605	1,735,409	19,444,476
2024	1,700,651	1,255,032	1,407,986	1,678,309	1,705,400	1,645,531	1,678,659	1,683,092	1,636,382	1,721,066	1,660,743	1,734,987	19,507,838
2025	1,725,654	1,024,676	1,697,351	1,654,368	1,716,335	1,630,089	1,649,917	1,668,532	1,623,669	1,708,389	1,194,392	1,580,580	18,873,952
2026	1,635,317	970,636	1,696,782	1,556,216	1,564,061	1,646,462	1,658,088	1,682,303					--

== See also ==
- List of largest power stations in the United States
