= Country First =

Country First may refer to:

- "Country First", the slogan of the John McCain 2008 presidential campaign in the United States
- Country First, a 2021 American political action committee launched by Adam Kinzinger
