= USS LST-1130 =

LST-542-class landing ship tank

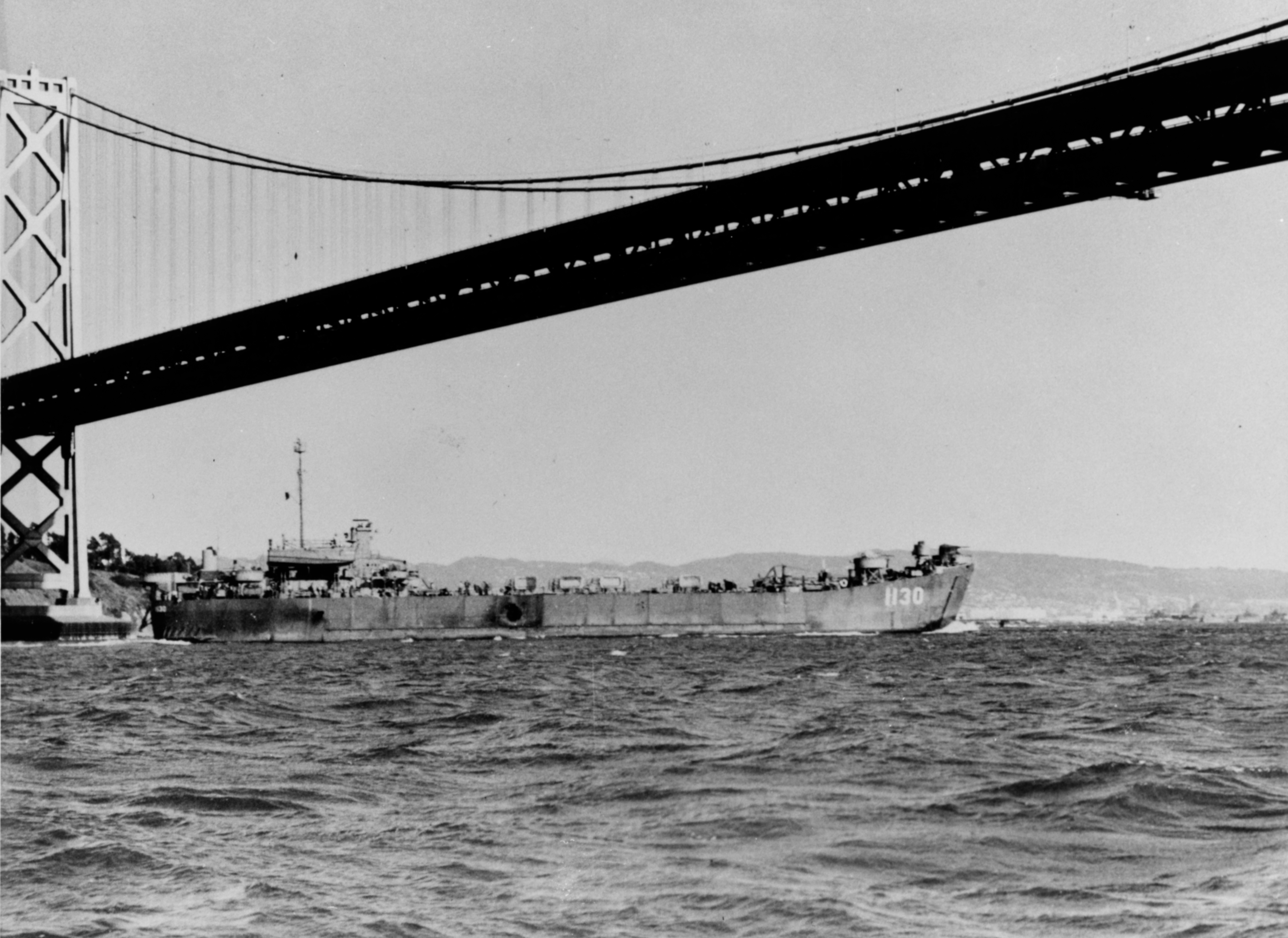
- USS LST-1130

History

United States
- Name: LST-1130
- Builder: Chicago Bridge and Iron Co., Seneca
- Laid down: 5 December 1944
- Launched: 27 February 1945
- Sponsored by: Mrs Bessie F. Jipson
- Commissioned: 20 March 1945
- Decommissioned: 23 March 1948
- Stricken: 12 March 1948
- Identification: Callsign: NBOL
- Fate: Scrapped

General characteristics
- Class & type: LST-542-class tank landing ship
- Displacement: 1,625 long tons (1,651 t) light; 4,080 long tons (4,145 t) full
- Length: 328 ft (100 m)
- Beam: 50 ft (15 m)
- Draft: Unloaded : 2 ft 4 in (0.71 m) forward; 7 ft 6 in (2.29 m) aft; Loaded : 8 ft 2 in (2.49 m) forward; 14 ft 1 in (4.29 m) aft
- Propulsion: 2 × General Motors 12-567 diesel engines, two shafts, twin rudders
- Speed: 12 knots (22 km/h; 14 mph)
- Boats & landing craft carried: 2 × LCVPs
- Troops: 16 officers, 147 enlisted men
- Complement: 7 officers, 104 enlisted men
- Armament: 8 × 40 mm guns; 12 × 20 mm guns

USS LST-1130 was a LST-542-class tank landing ship in the United States Navy during World War II.

== Construction and commissioning ==
LST-1130 was laid down on 5 December 1944 at Chicago Bridge and Iron Company, Seneca, Illinois. Launched on 27 February 1945 and commissioned on 20 March 1945.

During World War II, LST-1130 was assigned to the Asiatic-Pacific theater. She was assigned to occupation and China from 23 September to 2 December 1945, 24 June to 25 July 1946 and 26 July to 24 November 1946.

She was decommissioned on 23 March 1948 and was struck from the Naval Register on 12 March 1948. On 23 March 1948, following a grounding at Yap, Caroline Islands, which left the ship in a condition beyond economical repair.

== Awards ==
LST-1130 have earned the following awards:

- China Service Medal (extended)
- American Campaign Medal
- Asiatic-Pacific Campaign Medal
- World War II Victory Medal
- Navy Occupation Service Medal (with Asia clasp)

== Sources ==
- United States. Dept. of the Treasury (1962). Treasury Decisions Under the Customs, Internal Revenue, Industrial Alcohol, Narcotic and Other Laws, Volume 97. U.S. Government Printing Office.
- Moore, Capt. John (1984). Jane's Fighting Ships 1984-85. Jane's Information Group. ISBN 978-0710607959.
- Saunders, Stephen (2009). Jane's Fighting Ships 2009-2010. Jane's Information Group. ISBN 978-0710628886.
- Fairplay International Shipping Journal Volume 222. United Kingdom: Fairplay Publishing Limited. 1967.
