= LaSalle Lake State Fish and Wildlife Area =

State park in Illinois, United States

- IUCN category IV (habitat/species management area)
- Location within Illinois Location within the United States
- Location: LaSalle County, Illinois, U.S.
- Nearest city: Marseilles, Illinois
- Coordinates: 41°15′15″N 88°37′50″W
- Area: 2,058 acres (833 ha)
- Governing body: Illinois Department of Natural Resources

LaSalle Lake State Fish and Wildlife Area is an Illinois state park on 2,058 acres (833 ha) in LaSalle County, Illinois, United States. It is a man-made lake, built as a cooling pond for the LaSalle County Generating Station.
