= Adam Kinzinger =

American politician (born 1978)

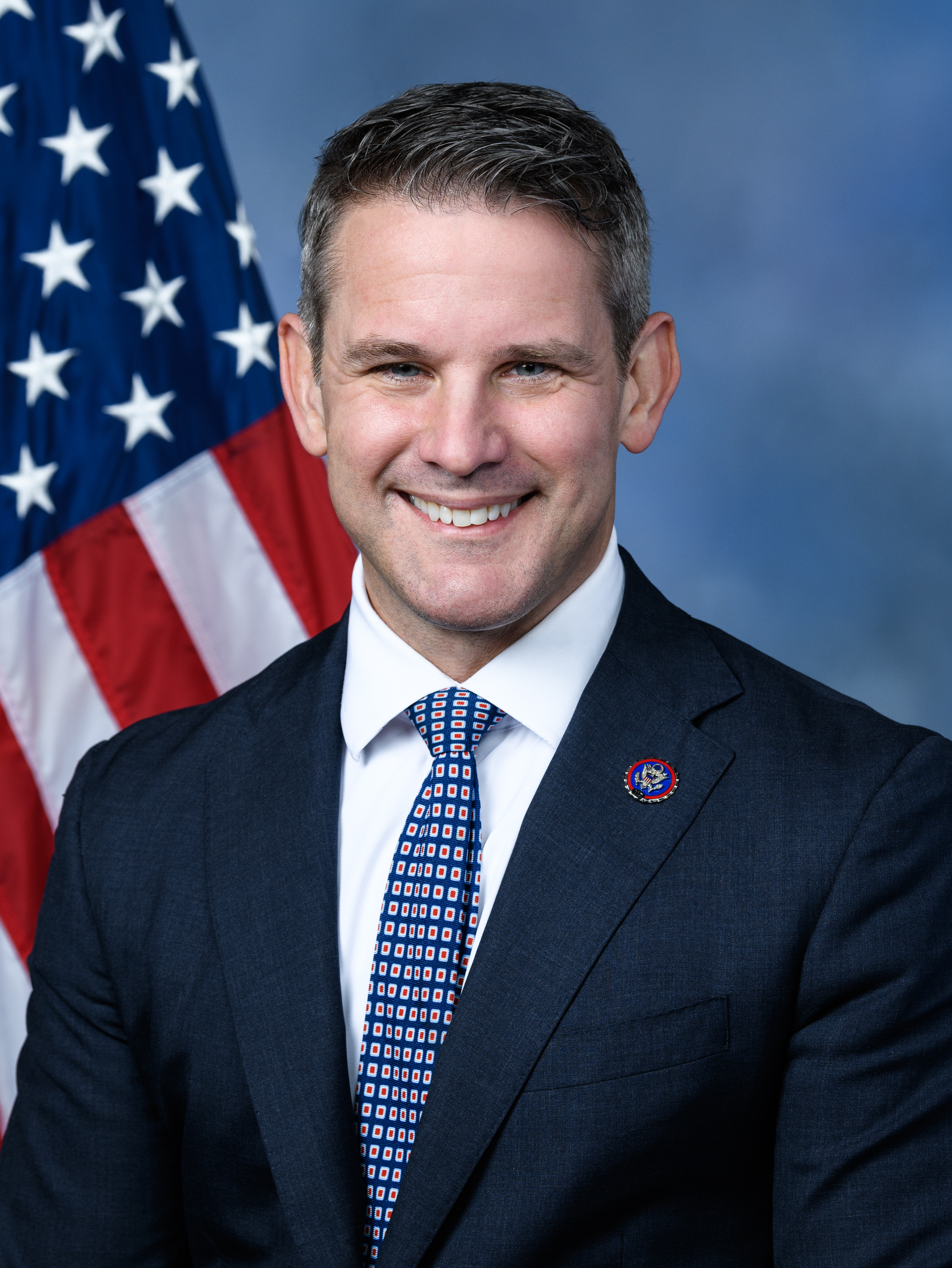
- Official portrait, 2021

Member of the U.S. House of Representatives from Illinois
- In office January 3, 2011 – January 3, 2023
- Preceded by: Debbie Halvorson
- Succeeded by: Darin LaHood (redistricted)
- Constituency: 11th district (2011–2013); 16th district (2013–2023)

Personal details
- Born: Adam Daniel Kinzinger; February 27, 1978 (age 48) Kankakee, Illinois, U.S.
- Party: Republican
- Spouse: Sofia Boza-Holman (m. 2020)
- Children: 1
- Education: Illinois State University (BA)

Military service
- Allegiance: United States
- Branch/service: United States Air Force; Air National Guard
- Years of service: 2003–2023
- Rank: Lieutenant Colonel
- Unit: Wisconsin Air National Guard
- Battles/wars: Iraq War; Operation Iraqi Freedom; War in Afghanistan
- Awards: Air Medal (6)
- Kinzinger's voice Kinzinger on legislation sanctioning Turkey for the 2019 offensive into northern Syria; Recorded October 29, 2019

Adam Daniel Kinzinger (/ˈkɪnzɪŋər/; born February 27, 1978) is an American politician, political commentator, and former United States Air Force and Air National Guard officer. A member of the Republican Party, he served as a U.S. representative from Illinois from 2011 to 2023, representing Illinois's 11th congressional district and later its 16th district.

Kinzinger was first elected to Congress in 2010 from the 11th district. His district was largely merged with the 16th after the 2010 census, and Kinzinger transferred to the 16th after defeating incumbent Don Manzullo in the Republican primary. After President Donald Trump lost the 2020 presidential election, Kinzinger became known for his vocal opposition to Trump's false claims of voter fraud and attempts to overturn the results. His story was featured in the documentary film The Last Republican.

Kinzinger did not seek reelection to Congress in 2022. After leaving office, he joined CNN as a senior political commentator.

== Early life, education, and early political career ==
Kinzinger was born on February 27, 1978, in Kankakee, Illinois, the son of Betty Jo, an elementary school teacher, and Rus Kinzinger, a CEO of religious faith–based organizations. After spending part of his youth in Jacksonville, Florida, he was primarily raised in Bloomington, Illinois. He graduated from Normal Community West High School in 1996 and earned a bachelor's degree in political science from Illinois State University in 2000.

In 1998, while a student at Illinois State, Kinzinger ran for election as a county board member in McLean County. He won, defeating an incumbent, and at age 20 was one of the youngest county board members in McLean County history. Kinzinger remained on the board until resigning in 2003.

Kinzinger worked as an intern for then–U.S. Senator Peter Fitzgerald shortly after his graduation from Illinois State, as part of a program offered there.

== Military service ==
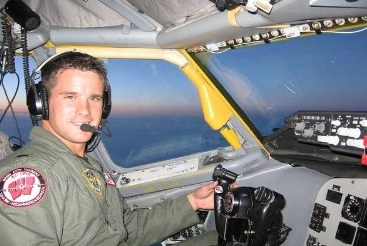
Kinzinger piloting a Boeing KC-135 Stratotanker during his service with the United States Air Force

Kinzinger resigned from the McLean County Board in 2003 to join the United States Air Force. He was commissioned a second lieutenant in November 2003 and later awarded his pilot wings. Kinzinger was initially a KC-135 Stratotanker pilot and flew missions in South America, Guam, Iraq and Afghanistan. He later switched to flying the RC-26 surveillance aircraft and was stationed in Iraq twice. During his service in the Afghanistan and Iraq wars, Kinzinger earned the Air Medal six times.

Kinzinger has served in the Air Force Special Operations Command, Air Combat Command, Air Mobility Command, and Wisconsin Air National Guard and was progressively promoted to the rank of Lieutenant Colonel. As part of his continued service with the Air National Guard, Kinzinger was deployed to the Mexico–United States border in February 2019 as part of efforts to maintain border security. Kinzinger retired from the Air National Guard after 20 years of service.

== U.S. House of Representatives ==
=== Elections ===
==== 2010 ====
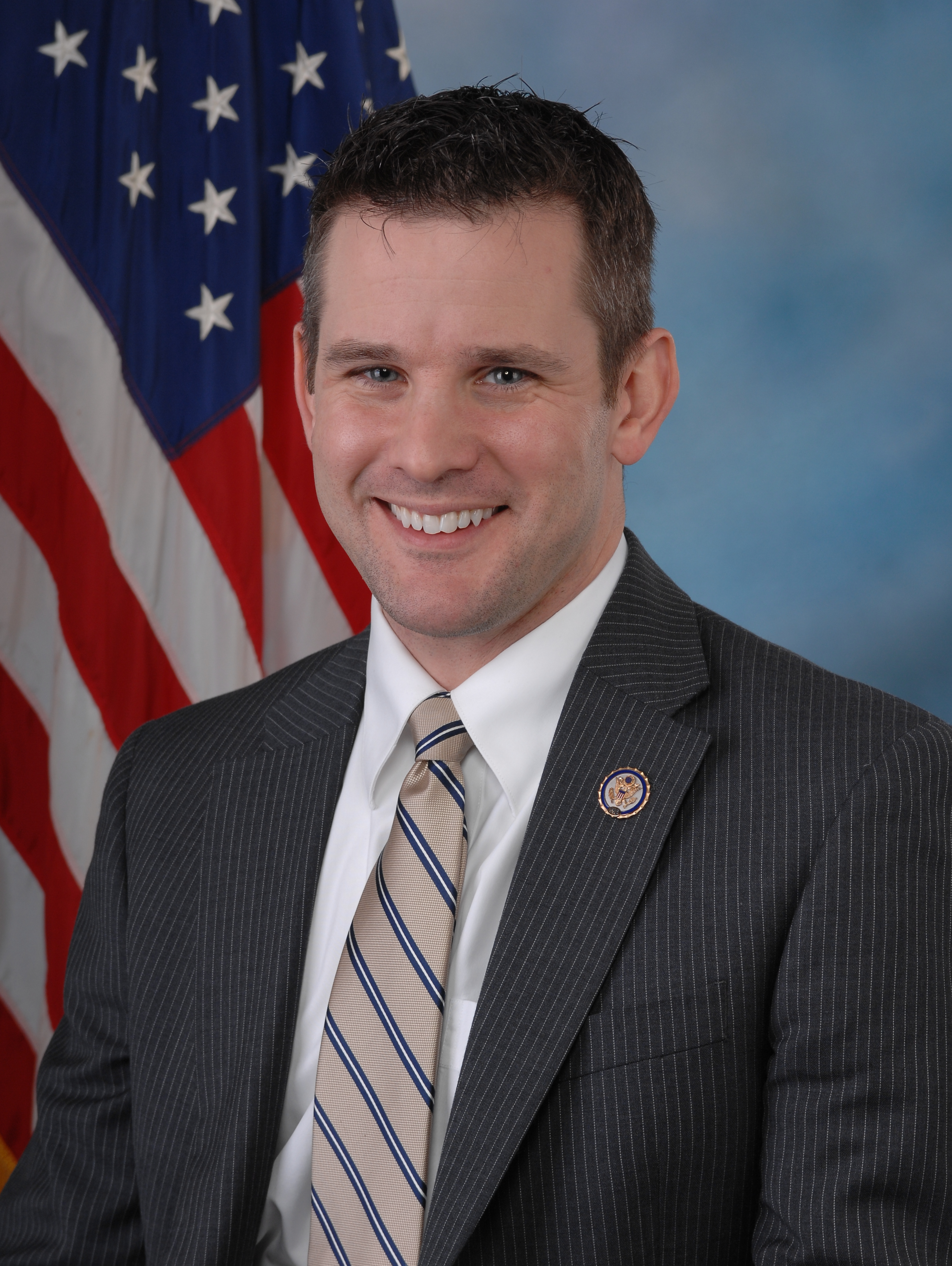
Official portrait, 2011

Kinzinger met Republican U.S. Representatives Mike Pence, Mark Kirk, and Peter Roskam in January 2009 to discuss a possible run for Congress. He decided to run in Illinois's 11th congressional district, held by Democrat Debbie Halvorson. He started campaigning full-time in May 2009, when he returned home from his 3rd tour in Iraq. He was endorsed by former Alaska Governor Sarah Palin. Kinzinger won the five-candidate Republican primary on February 2, 2010, with 64% of the vote.

He was endorsed by the Chicago Tribune and the Chicago Sun-Times in the general election. Kinzinger defeated Halvorson 57–43% on November 2, 2010.

==== 2012 ====
During his first term, Kinzinger represented a district that stretched from the outer southern suburbs of Chicago to Bloomington/Normal.

After redistricting, Kinzinger's district was eliminated. Much of its eastern portion, including Kinzinger's home in Channahon, near Joliet, was merged with the Rockford-based 16th District, represented by fellow Republican Don Manzullo, a 67-year-old politician first elected in 1992. Before redistricting, Kinzinger had represented 31% of the newly apportioned district, while Manzullo had represented at least 44% of it. In the March Republican primary, Kinzinger defeated Manzullo, 56–44%. In the general election, Kinzinger defeated Democrat Wanda Rohl, 62–38%.

Then-House Majority Leader Eric Cantor helped Kinzinger, who was a rising Republican star, topple Manzullo in the Illinois primary.

==== 2014 ====
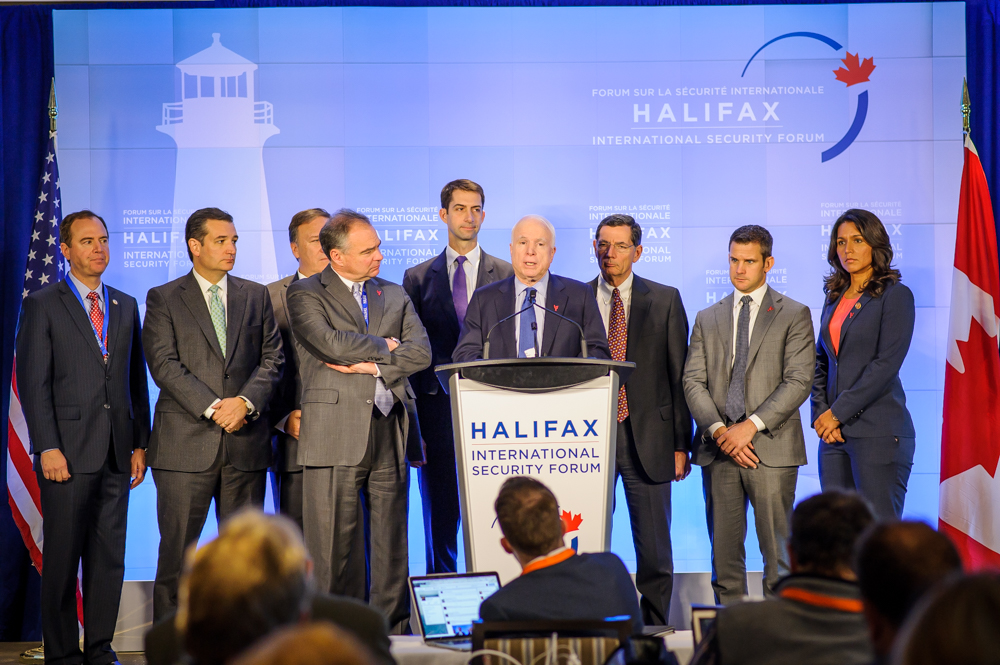
Kinzinger (second from right) at the Halifax International Security Forum

Kinzinger was targeted by the Club for Growth in 2014. In the Republican primary, he faced David Hale, a nurse and founder of the Rockford Tea Party. Kinzinger won with 78% of the vote.

In the general election, Kinzinger defeated Democratic nominee Randall Olsen with 71% of the vote.

==== 2016 ====
Kinzinger won the March 2016 Republican primary with 100% of the vote. No candidates filed for the Democratic primary for his seat and no Democrat ran in the election; Kinzinger won the election with 99.9% of the vote.

Kinzinger announced publicly that he would not support GOP presidential nominee Donald Trump on August 3, 2016. "I'm an American before I'm a Republican," he told CNN's Wolf Blitzer, adding, "I'm a Republican because I believe that Republicanism is the best way to defend the United States of America... [Trump] throws all of these Republican principles on their head." Kinzinger noted, however, that he also would not support Democratic nominee Hillary Clinton, and was mulling other options.

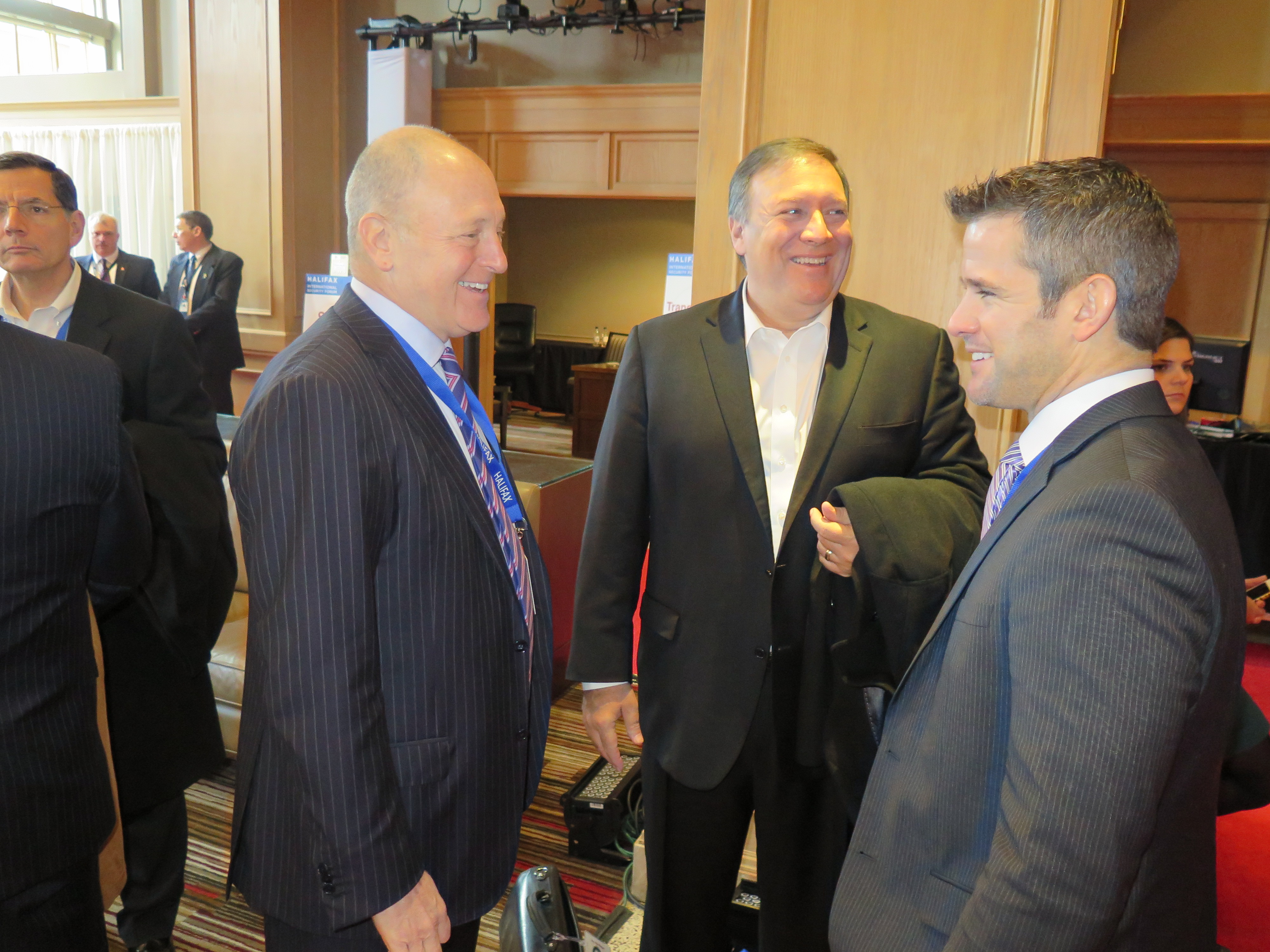
Kinzinger with U.S. Ambassador to Canada Bruce Heyman and Representative Mike Pompeo

Kinzinger introduced the U.S. House version of the bipartisan bill Countering Foreign Propaganda and Disinformation Act. The United States Senate version was written in March 2016 by Senators Chris Murphy and Rob Portman. After the 2016 U.S. presidential election, worries grew that Russian propaganda spread and organized by the Russian government swayed the outcome of the election, and members of Congress took action to safeguard the national security of the United States by advancing legislation to monitor incoming propaganda from external threats. On November 30, 2016, legislators approved a measure within the National Defense Authorization Act to ask the U.S. State Department to take action against foreign propaganda through an interagency panel. The legislation authorized funding of $160 million over a two-year period. The initiative was developed through the Countering Foreign Propaganda and Disinformation Act.

==== 2018 ====
Kinzinger defeated Democratic challenger Sara Dady with 59.1% of the vote. After the 2018 midterm elections, which saw all the Republican congressmen representing the Chicago area defeated, he was left as the only Republican representing a significant part of northern Illinois in Congress.

==== 2020 ====
Kinzinger defeated Democrat Dani Brzozowski in the 2020 election with 65% of the vote.

=== Tenure ===
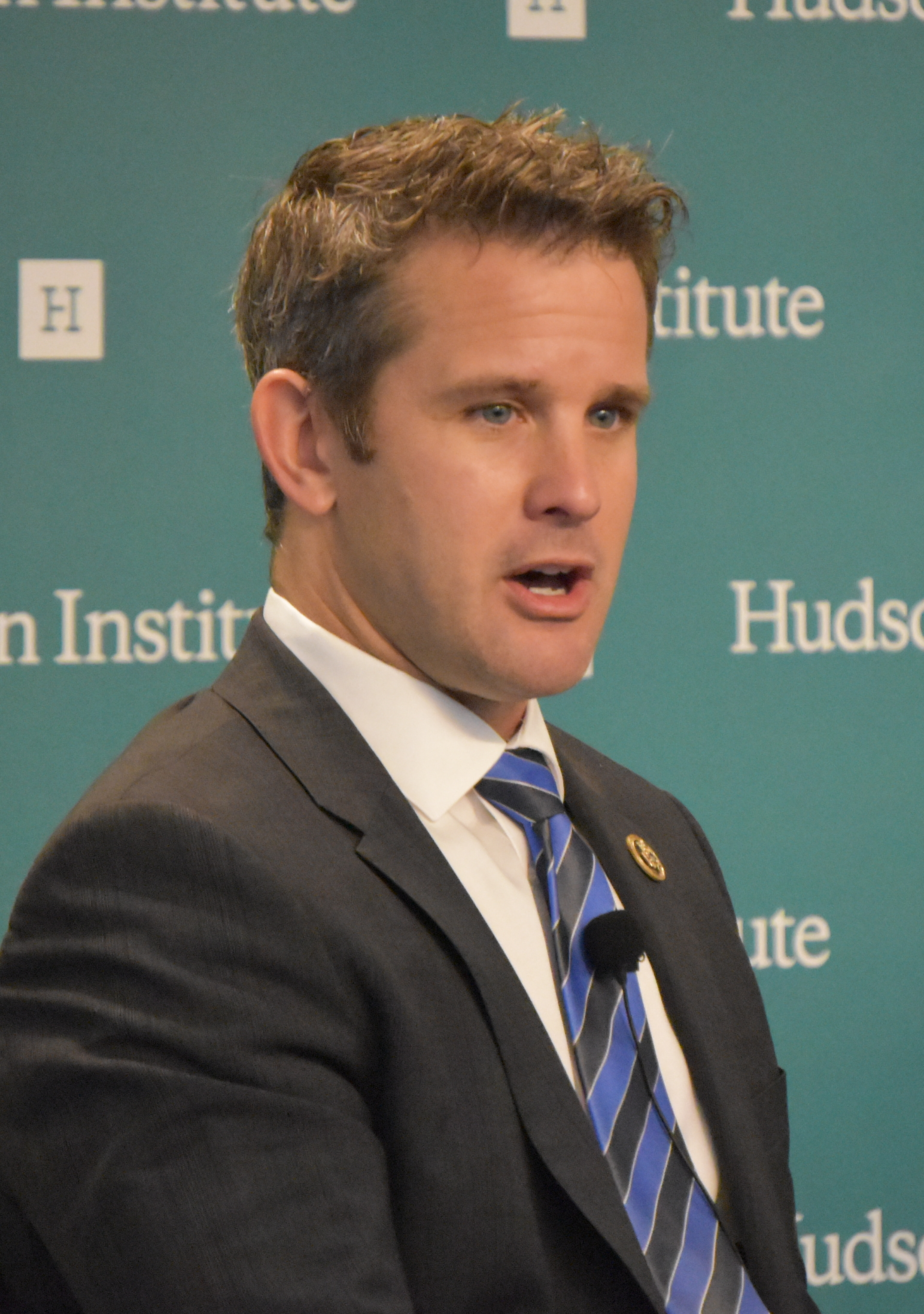
Kinzinger speaking at Hudson Institute

In 2010, Kinzinger signed a pledge sponsored by Americans for Prosperity promising to vote against any global warming legislation that would raise taxes.

Kinzinger sponsored the Veteran Emergency Medical Technician Support Act of 2013. The legislation, which would make it easier for veterans with emergency medical technician training in the military to get civilian licenses to perform the same job outside of the military, passed the House of Representatives by a voice vote but was not voted upon by the Senate.

On June 5, 2014, Kinzinger introduced a bill (H.R. 4801; 113th Congress) which would require the United States Secretary of Energy to prepare a report on the effects that thermal insulation has on both energy consumption and systems for providing potable water in federal buildings. Kinzinger argued that "with the federal government being the single largest consumer of energy in the country, doing our best to maximize the potential savings from improved insulation systems is a commonsense step I think everybody can agree on."

Kinzinger was a member of both the Republican Study Committee and the Republican Main Street Partnership.

Kinzinger was ranked as the 40th most bipartisan member of the House during the 114th United States Congress (and the third most bipartisan member of the House from Illinois) in the Bipartisan Index created by The Lugar Center and the McCourt School of Public Policy, which ranks members of Congress by their degree of bipartisanship (by measuring how often each member's bills attract co-sponsors from the opposite party and each member co-sponsors bills by members of the opposite party).

Kinzinger voted for the 2017 Republican healthcare legislation, which would have repealed major parts of the Affordable Care Act (Obamacare).

Kinzinger voted for the Tax Cuts and Jobs Act of 2017.

During the COVID-19 pandemic, Kinzinger was accused of stoking racial hatred by an Asian American op-ed writer for blaming China for the pandemic at a time that anti-Asian hate crimes and coronavirus-related discrimination were rising. Kinzinger authored and retweeted many tweets singling out China for blame. One such tweet was "Daily reminder: You are in your homes because #Chinahidthevirus."

According to journalist Jeremy W. Peters, Kinzinger had an uneasy feeling on the day of the January 6, 2021, attack on the Capitol and asked his wife not to attend the joint session to officially certify the election. He also told his office staff not to come to work that day and took his .380 caliber Ruger LCP to the Capitol and to the Rayburn House Office Building. Just after 2:18 p.m., Kinzinger received an email from the Capitol Police telling him to stay away from windows, close and lock doors, remain quiet, and silence all electronics. At this point Kinzinger barricaded the doors of his office and took out his gun.

On February 4, 2021, Kinzinger joined 10 other Republican House members voting with all voting Democrats to strip Marjorie Taylor Greene of her House Education and Labor Committee and House Budget Committee assignments in response to controversial political statements she had made.

In March 2021, Kinzinger was one of eight Republicans to join the House majority in passing the Bipartisan Background Checks Act of 2021.

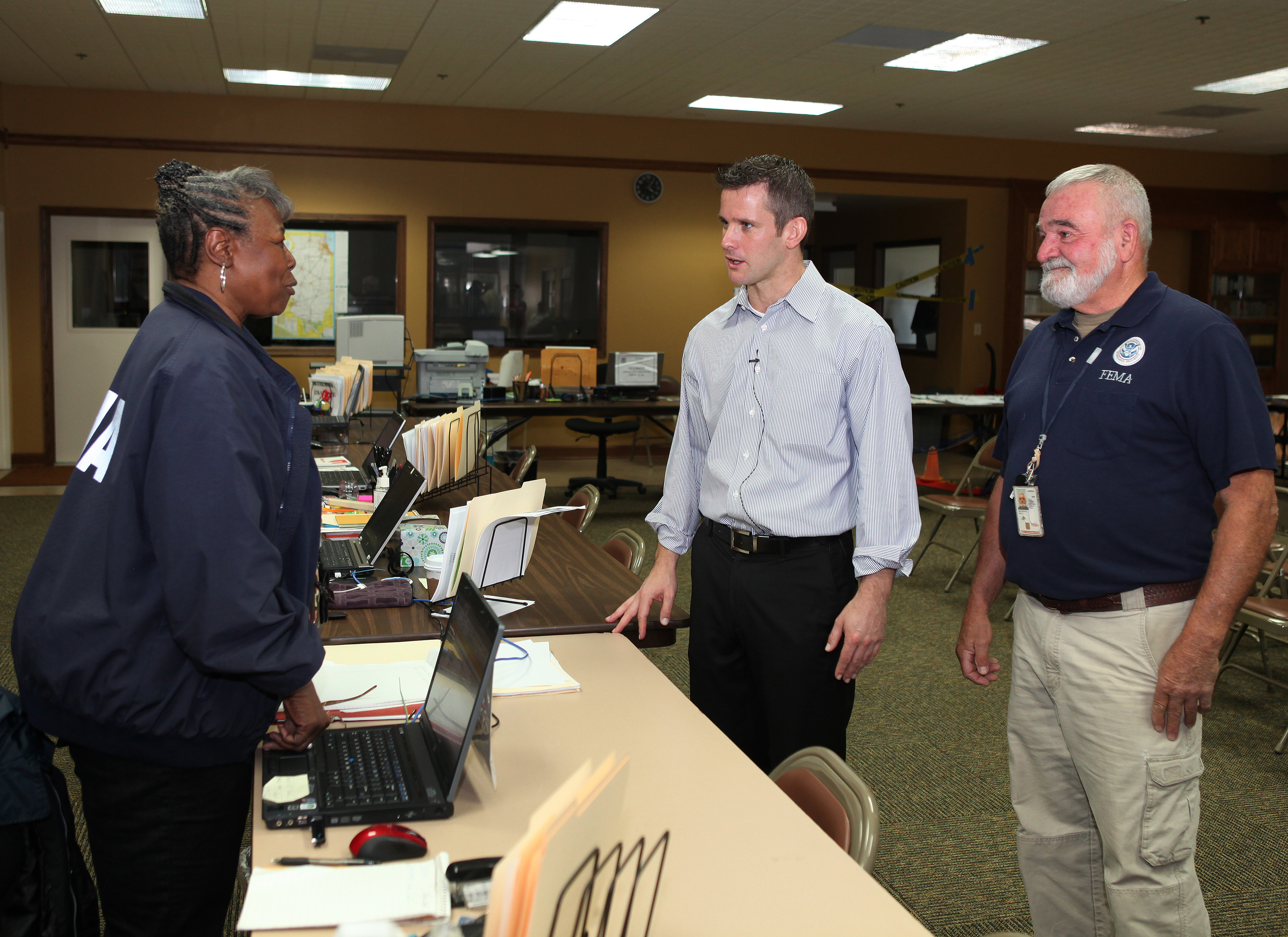
Kinzinger visits the Disaster Recovery Center in Marseilles, Illinois.

On April 9, 2021, Kinzinger called for Matt Gaetz to resign while he was being investigated on sex trafficking charges.

On May 19, 2021, Kinzinger and 34 other Republican House members in the 117th Congress voted to create a National Commission to Investigate the January 6th Attack on the United States Capitol Complex, intended to probe the U.S. Capitol attack. They joined all 217 Democrats present to vote to establish such a body. After the Senate failed to support the national bipartisan commission due to a Republican filibuster, Kinzinger remained committed to the concept.

On July 1, 2021, Kinzinger voiced disdain about sanctions threatened by Republican leadership against Republican lawmakers who would participate in a House committee to investigate the Capitol attack. On July 25, he accepted Speaker Pelosi's appointment of him to the House Committee on the Jan. 6 Attack.

During a September 5, 2021, interview on CNN's State of the Union, Kinzinger said his party "desperately needs to tell the truth", that if the party pushes lies and conspiracy theories, it does not deserve to win Congressional majorities in the 2022 elections, that if they were "going to be in charge and pushing conspiracy, pushing division, and pushing lies, then the Republican Party should not have the majority", and that it "is a pretty scary place to go in this world if we start using our power as a way to get the outcome that we want" in elections.

On October 29, 2021, Kinzinger announced that he would not seek reelection to Congress in 2022, after redistricting placed him and another Republican incumbent, Darin LaHood, in the same district. The redrawn district was geographically more his district than LaHood's, but Kinzinger opted to retire.

On November 5, 2021, Kinzinger was one of 13 House Republicans to break with their party and vote with a majority of Democrats for the Infrastructure Investment and Jobs Act.

After leaving Congress, Kinzinger joined CNN as a senior political commentator on January 4, 2023.

==== Investigation into the January 6 attack on the Capitol ====
Kinzinger giving remarks following the January 6 Capitol attack, in 2021

On July 1, 2021, Kinzinger voiced disdain about sanctions threatened by Republican leadership against Republican lawmakers who would participate in a House committee to investigate the Capitol attack. After McCarthy rescinded his recommendations, Pelosi announced on July 25 that she had appointed Kinzinger to the committee. Kinzinger was one of the ten House Republicans who voted for Trump's second impeachment. As a member of the committee investigating the January 6 attack and related issues, Kinzinger oversaw its fifth public hearing on June 23, 2022, serving as the lead questioner of witnesses. The hearing featured testimony from former Department of Justice officials describing how Trump tried to enlist them in his fight to overturn the 2020 presidential election. Kinzinger also co-led the eighth hearing with Representative Elaine Luria.

==== Censure by Republican National Committee ====
On February 4, 2022, the Republican National Committee called the events of January 6, 2021, a "legitimate political discourse" and overwhelmingly voted by voice vote to censure Kinzinger, along with Representative Liz Cheney, for taking part in the House investigation of the Capitol assault.

==== Farewell address ====
In his farewell address to Congress on December 15, 2022, Kinzinger warned his colleagues of the influence of conspiracy theories and falsehoods on politics, as well as threats to democracy in America and rising authoritarianism and factionalism. He criticized the Republican Party, saying:

Where Republicans once believed that limited government meant lower taxes and more autonomy, today limited government means inciting violence against government officials.

Following the tragic Oklahoma City bombing, former President George H. W. Bush publicly refuted those who used fear to gain support. In stark contrast, our leaders today belittle, and in some cases justify, attacks on the U.S. Capitol as "legitimate political discourse". The once great party of Lincoln, Roosevelt, and Reagan has turned its back on the ideals of liberty and self-governance. Instead, it has embraced lies and deceit.

The Republican Party used to believe in a big tent, which welcomed the tired, the poor, the huddled masses yearning to breathe free. Now we shelter the ignorant, the racists, who only stoke anger and hatred to those that are different than us.

Our constituents voted us in based on our beliefs, but we cannot use our faith as a sword and a shield while ignoring the fact we are all children of God, that we are all Americans.

Kinzinger also criticized Democrats:

To my Democratic colleagues, you too must bear the burden of our failures. Many of you have asked me, "Where are all the good Republicans?" Over the past two years, Democratic leadership had the opportunity to stand above the fray. Instead, they poured millions of dollars into the campaigns of MAGA Republicans, the same candidates President Biden called a national security threat, to ensure these good Republicans do not make it out of their respective primaries. This is no longer politics as usual; this is not a game. If you keep stoking the fire, you can't point the fingers when our great experiment goes up in flames.

=== Committee assignments ===
- Committee on Energy and Commerce
  - Subcommittee on Communications and Technology
  - Subcommittee on Energy
- Committee on Foreign Affairs
  - Subcommittee on the Middle East, North Africa, and International Terrorism
  - Subcommittee on Europe, Eurasia, Energy, and the Environment (Ranking Member)
- United States House Select Committee on the January 6 Attack

=== Caucus memberships ===
- Congressional Cement Caucus
- Friends of a Free Syria Caucus
- House Baltic Caucus
- Congressional NextGen 9-1-1 Caucus
- United States Congressional International Conservation Caucus
- Climate Solutions Caucus
- Congressional Taiwan Caucus
- Republican Governance Group
- Republican Main Street Partnership

== Political positions ==
=== Domestic issues ===
==== Gun law ====
As a lawmaker, Kinzinger was in favor of allowing concealed carry of firearms across state lines where concealed carry is legal.

On March 11, 2021, Kinzinger was one of eight House Republicans who voted to pass the Bipartisan Background Checks Act of 2021.

On May 29, 2022, Kinzinger announced that he was "open to" an assault weapons ban following the 2022 Robb Elementary School shooting that killed 22 people.

==== Healthcare ====
In 2017, Kinzinger voted to repeal the Affordable Care Act (Obamacare).

=== Economic issues ===
Kinzinger opposed the Dodd–Frank Act.

Kinzinger gained a 94% lifetime rating from the U.S. Chamber of Commerce, a business-oriented group, and a 49% lifetime rating from the Club for Growth, a conservative group, which advocates for tax cuts, lower spending, deregulation, and free trade.

Although many House Republicans previously supported elements of the America COMPETES Act of 2022, Kinzinger was the only minority member to vote for the bill, after their House leadership urged a "No" vote, holding that the bill was too weak on China.

=== International issues ===
==== Immigration ====
Kinzinger supported penalizing sanctuary cities.

Kinzinger supported Deferred Action for Childhood Arrivals (DACA).

Kinzinger voted for the Further Consolidated Appropriations Act, 2020 which authorizes DHS to nearly double the available H-2B visas for the remainder of FY 2020.

Kinzinger voted for the Consolidated Appropriations Act, 2020 (H.R. 1158), which effectively prohibits ICE from cooperating with Health and Human Services to detain or remove illegal alien sponsors of unaccompanied alien children (UACs).

==== Iran ====
On Twitter, Kinzinger praised Donald Trump's decision to have Iranian Major General Qasem Soleimani, Commander of the Quds Force and the third most powerful person in Iran, killed. Reacting to news of the assassination, Kinzinger tweeted, "Mess with the bull, get the horns. If true, nice call, @realdonaldtrump." He continued tweeting, writing, "killed a man responsible for thousands of deaths in #Syria and elsewhere, including Americans. Let's see how long the #blameAmerica left takes to make him a poor victim."

Kinzinger also supported Trump's attacks on Iran's nuclear facilities in June 2025.

==== Russia and Ukraine ====
After the Russian invasion of Ukraine began in February 2022, Kinzinger supported providing aid to Ukraine. Until the end of his tenure, he was among the most vocal members of Congress on the topic on social media. He is a member of NAFO, an online pro-Ukrainian movement dedicated to countering propaganda and disinformation. His support stood in contrast to some Republicans who opposed the aid; when House Minority Leader Kevin McCarthy declared the party would not "write a blank check" to Ukraine should they retake the House, Kinzinger accused him of "giving aid and comfort to the enemy, intentionally or unintentionally."

As the Russian invasion proved less successful than had generally been expected, Kinzinger argued additional U.S. support had become a more practical investment. He also rebutted claims that supplying aid would escalate the conflict, comparing that argument to "a husband saying, 'If you leave me, I'll hit you harder and so you can't go.' We should stop self-deterring like this because all the evidence points to the Russians not being able to do much about anything."

Kinzinger consistently voted in favor of support to Ukraine, including the Ukraine Democracy Defense Lend-Lease Act of 2022, H.R. 956 (supporting the people of Ukraine), H.R. 7108 (suspending trade relations with Russia and Belarus), and H.R. 7691 (renewing Ukrainian aid following the fiscal year). In May, he introduced an Authorization for Use of Military Force resolution to allow the United States Armed Forces to respond if Russia deploys biological, chemical, or nuclear weapons against Ukraine. A month later, he sponsored a House bill to give training to Ukrainian Air Force pilots on the F-15 Eagle and F-16 Fighting Falcon.

=== Social issues ===
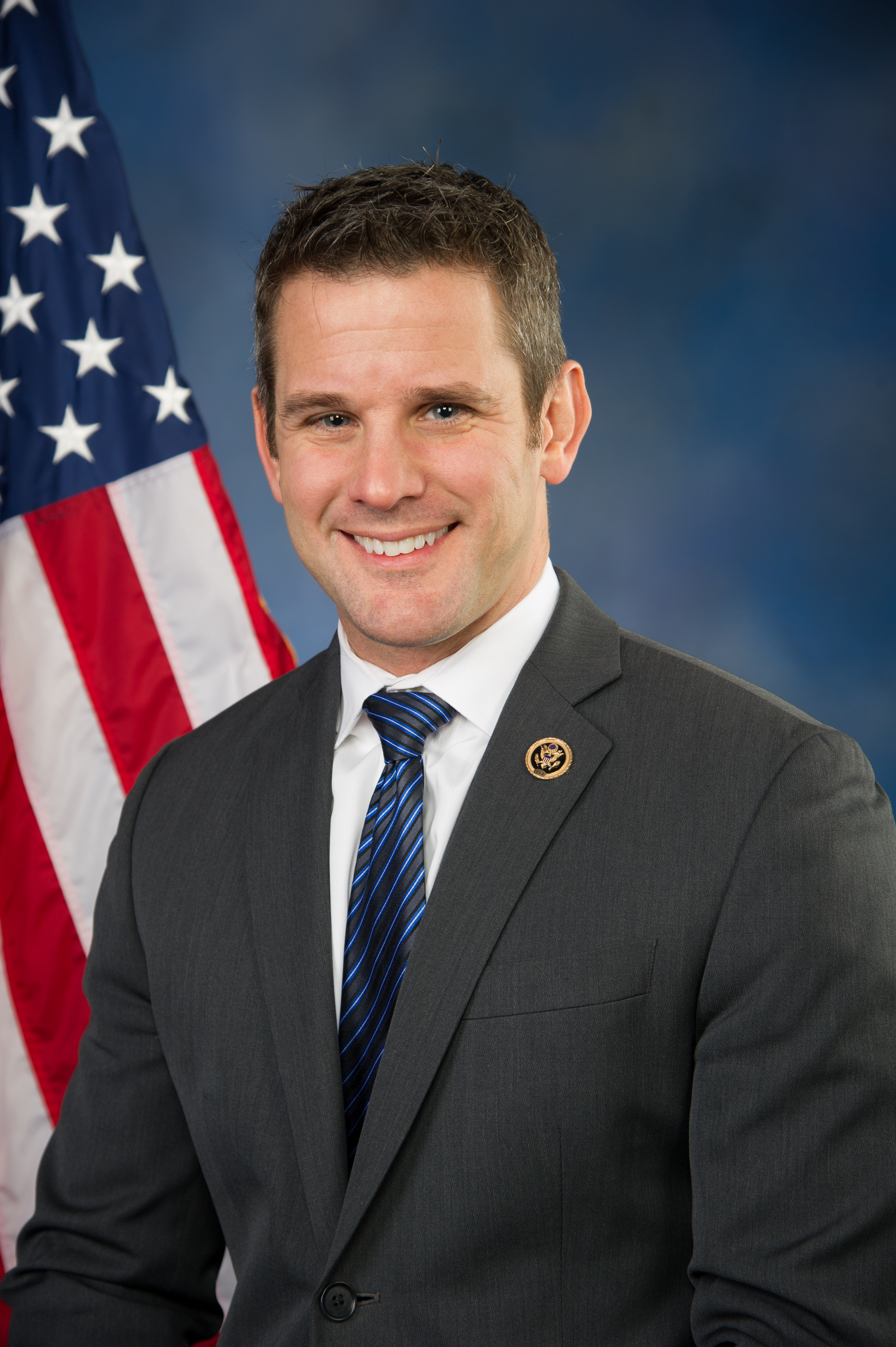
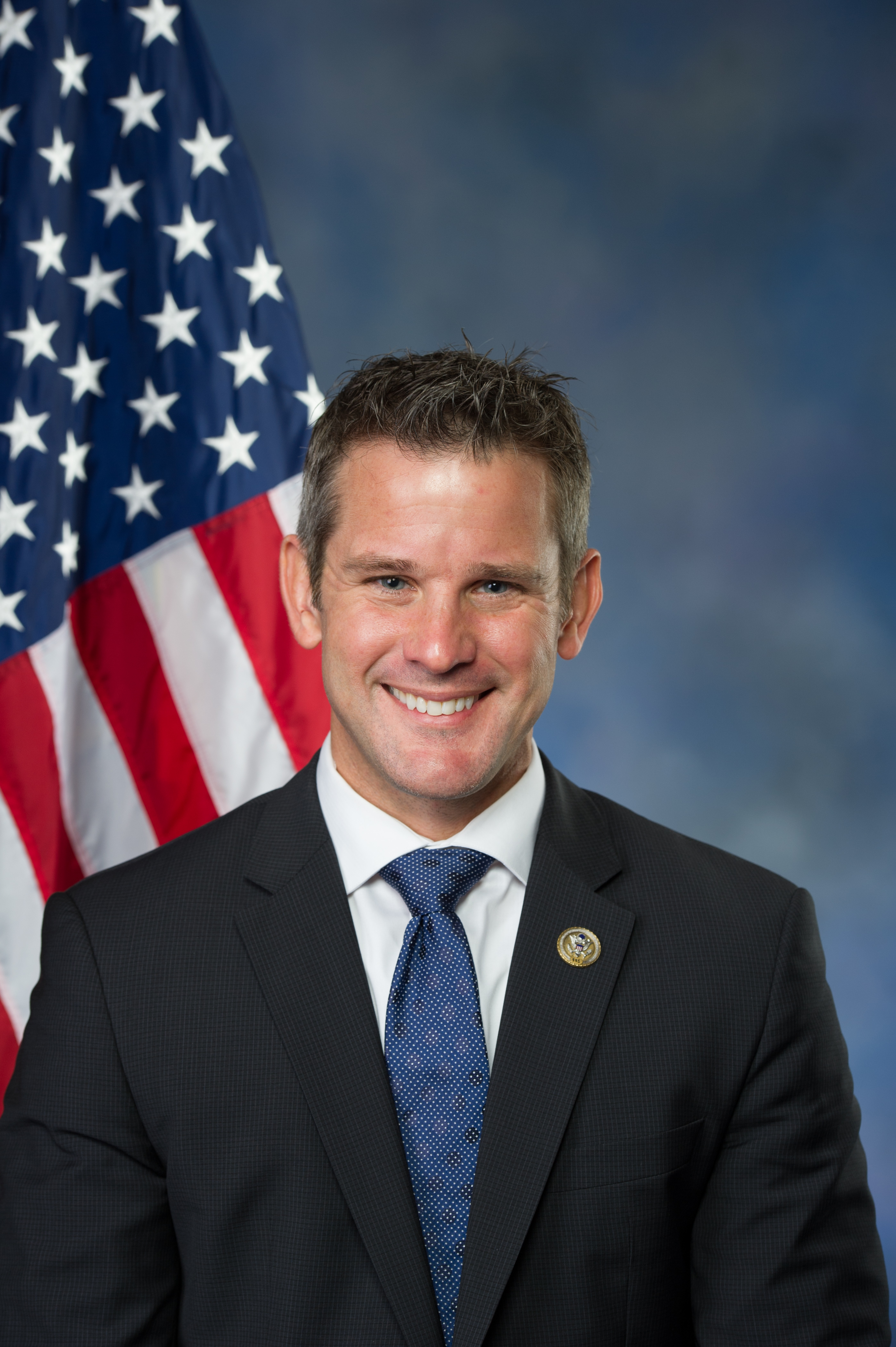
Kinzinger's official Congressional photos from 2015 (left) and 2017 (right)

==== Abortion ====
Kinzinger opposed late-term abortion and the use of federal funds for abortion or health coverage that funds abortion.

Kinzinger was one of three Republicans to vote for H.R. 8297: Ensuring Access to Abortion Act of 2022.

Kinzinger voted for H.R. 8373: The Right to Contraception Act. This bill was designed to protect access to contraceptives and healthcare providers' ability to provide contraceptives and information related to contraception. The bill would also fund Planned Parenthood.

==== Support for LGBTQ rights ====
As of 2022, Kinzinger gained a 59% rating from the Human Rights Campaign, the nation's largest LGBTQ rights advocacy group.

In 2015, Kinzinger was one of 60 Republicans voting to uphold President Barack Obama's 2014 executive order banning federal contractors from making hiring decisions that discriminate based on sexual orientation or gender identity.

In 2016, Kinzinger was one of 43 Republicans to vote for the Maloney Amendment to H.R. 5055, intended to prohibit the use of funds for government contractors who discriminate against LGBT employees.

In 2019 and 2021, Kinzinger voted against the Equality Act. Nonetheless, he affirmed his support for the LGBT community and commitment to finding a suitable compromise that also protects religious liberty after his 2021 "no" vote.

On February 24, 2021, Representative Marjorie Taylor Greene hung a sign outside of her office reading "There are TWO genders: MALE & FEMALE 'Trust The Science!'" in response to Representative Marie Newman, whose office was directly across from hers and who put a transgender flag outside her office in support of the Equality Act. Kinzinger quote-tweeted Greene and said, "This is sad and I'm sorry this happened. Rep. Newmans [sic] daughter is transgender, and this video and tweet represents the hate and fame driven politics of self-promotion at all evil costs. This garbage must end, in order to #RestoreOurGOP". In an interview with Rolling Stone later that year, Kinzinger lambasted Tucker Carlson for mocking Pete Buttigieg's homosexuality after he took paternity leave, affirming that Buttigieg remained more competent than necessary as the Secretary of Transportation and calling Carlson's remark a "cheap shot" designed to keep his audience interested.

In 2021, Kinzinger was one of 21 House Republicans to sponsor the Fairness for All Act, the Republican alternative to the Equality Act. The bill would prohibit discrimination on the basis of sex, sexual orientation, and gender identity, and protect the free exercise of religion.

In 2022, Kinzinger was one of six Republicans to vote in favor of the Global Respect Act, which imposes sanctions on foreign persons responsible for violations of internationally recognized human rights against lesbian, gay, bisexual, transgender, queer, and intersex (LGBTQI) individuals, and for other purposes.

On July 19, 2022, Kinzinger and 46 other Republican representatives voted for the Respect for Marriage Act, which protects same-sex and interracial marriage licenses in federal law. Kinzinger was absent from the vote on its final passage on December 8, 2022, but reportedly still intended to vote yes. He subsequently criticized his fellow Republicans for "owning the libs" and opposing LGBT+ rights.

=== Criticism of Donald Trump ===
Kinzinger voted in line with President Donald Trump about 90% of the time and voted against Trump's first impeachment (though he later admitted to regretting this vote), but he subsequently became one of Trump's biggest critics and made headlines as a rare Republican officeholder willing to criticize him. In summer 2020, Kinzinger denounced QAnon and other baseless conspiracy theories that gained currency among Republican voters. After the 2020 presidential election, which Trump lost to Joe Biden, Kinzinger denounced Trump's false claims that the election was stolen and criticized Trump's attempt to overturn the results of the 2020 presidential election. In December 2020, after Trump repeated his false claims of fraud on Twitter, Kinzinger tweeted that it was time for Trump to delete his Twitter account. He also criticized the Texas Republican Party and called for the firing of its chairman, Allen West, when the party floated the idea of secession, after the Supreme Court rejected Texas v. Pennsylvania, a bid by the state of Texas to overturn the presidential election outcome.

On January 7, 2021, the day after the storming of the U.S. Capitol by a violent pro-Trump mob, Kinzinger became the first Republican member of the House to call for Trump's removal from office via the 25th Amendment. In a video message, he said that Trump had "abdicated his duty to protect the American people and the people's house" and that Trump's behavior made clear that he had become "unmoored" from both his duties as president and "reality itself". Kinzinger urged Vice President Mike Pence and the Cabinet to invoke the 25th Amendment, saying that Trump was "unfit" and "unwell". Five days later, he announced that he would vote in favor of Trump's second impeachment, saying there was "no doubt" that Trump "broke his oath of office and incited this insurrection." Kinzinger also accused Trump of using the power of his office to launch a direct attack on Congress. He asked, "If these actions – the Article II branch inciting a deadly insurrection against the Article I branch – are not worthy of impeachment, then what is an impeachable offense?" On January 13, he joined nine other Republicans in voting for impeachment. In response, some Republicans vowed to support a primary challenge to Kinzinger. Kinzinger received a letter from 11 members of his family asserting he had joined "the devil's army" for publicly turning against Trump. Kinzinger said the family members suffer from "brainwashing" from conservative churches that led them astray.

On May 19, 2021, Kinzinger was one of 35 Republicans to join all Democrats in voting to approve legislation to establish the formation of a January 6 commission to investigate the storming of the U.S. Capitol. He was also one of two Republicans to join all Democrats in voting for a January 6 House select committee, along with Liz Cheney. Kinzinger's involvement with the January 6 proceedings resulted in his staff receiving threats against his family and colleagues. On October 21, 2021, Kinzinger was one of nine House Republicans to vote to hold Trump ally Steve Bannon in contempt of Congress for defying a subpoena from the January 6 Committee.

In a November 14, 2021, interview with Rolling Stone, Kinzinger said he regretted voting against Trump's first impeachment: "If I went back in time, I would vote for the first impeachment." In the interview, he also called Tucker Carlson a "manipulative son of a bitch".

Kinzinger and Elaine Luria were selected to lead the questioning in the eighth televised hearing of the January 6 Committee, on July 21, 2022.

On August 16, 2022, during an interview on MSNBC, Kinzinger claimed that some people have equated Trump with Jesus Christ, saying, "And you have people today that, literally, I think in their heart – they may not say it, but they equate Donald Trump with the person of Jesus Christ." He added, "And to them, if you even come out against this 'amazing man Donald Trump,' which, obviously quite flawed, you are coming out against Jesus, against their Christian values".

In February 2023, it was announced that Kinzinger was scheduled to release a book for Penguin Random House called Renegade: My Life in Faith, the Military, and Defending America from Trump's Attack on Democracy in October 2023.

In August 2024, Kinzinger addressed the Democratic National Convention, denouncing the Republican Party as "no longer conservative" and proclaiming his support for Kamala Harris's presidential campaign. He also described Trump as "a weak man pretending to be strong. He is a small man pretending to be big. He is a faithless man pretending to be righteous. He's a perpetrator who can't stop playing the victim."

In Fall 2024, director Steve Pink released the documentary film The Last Republican, which followed Kinzinger through his last term in office, and detailed his work on the January 6th Committee.

In August 2024, Donald Trump referred to himself as a war hero. In response, Kinzinger responded by saying "To put himself on the same level of people that have actually gone out and served this country, not claimed bone spurs, is an offense to anybody who served."

=== Country First movement ===
In early 2021, a few weeks after the January 6 Capitol attack, Kinzinger launched the Country First PAC, as a means to reform the Republican Party and distance itself from far-right conspiracies, including QAnon. In the first quarter of 2021, the PAC raised over $1.1 million to fight Donald Trump's growing influence over the Republican Party.

In the 2022 midterm elections, Country First supported candidates running against 2020 election deniers that were endorsed by Trump. The PAC put a special focus on pro-democracy candidates running in secretary of state races, as who ever won these elections would have oversight of 2024 presidential election administration. Through Country First, Kinzinger endorsed Democrats, Republicans, and independents. The endorsements included Evan McMullin, Brad Raffensperger, Katie Hobbs, Josh Shapiro, and Lisa Murkowski.

In the 2023 special election to fill a vacancy in the Wisconsin Senate, Country First ran negative advertisements to prevent the victory of Trumpist Janel Brandtjen in the Republican primary, which she ultimately did not win.

In March 2023, individuals wearing straitjackets were seen walking through the United States Capitol building. They were part of Country First's campaign against political extremism, entitled "Break Free".

Prior to the 2024 Republican Party presidential primaries, Country First sent out an email asking donors to give to Chris Christie's presidential campaign to ensure the candidate's appearance on the primary debate stage. Country First itself also donated to Christie's campaign. Kinzinger endorsed President Joe Biden for re-election before shifting his support to Biden's running mate and Vice President Kamala Harris following Biden's withdrawal from the election.

In the 2026 election cycle, Kinzinger and Country First endorsed James Talarico for U.S. Senator in Texas.

== January 6th Committee ==
Kinzinger was one of the 10 Republicans who voted to impeach Trump for incitement of insurrection in his second impeachment. He also voted to create, and was subsequently appointed to serve on, the select committee to investigate the 2021 United States Capitol attack.

On 2022, during the January 6th panel, Kinzinger criticized 5 Republican lawmakers including Matt Gaetz and Scott Perry, saying: "The only reason I know to ask for a pardon is because you think you've committed a crime."

On January 20, 2025, President Joe Biden announced a preemptive pardon for the January 6th Committee members including Kinzinger from potential future prosecution by the incoming Trump administration.

== Electoral history ==
=== 2010 ===
2010 Illinois's 11th congressional district Republican Party primary
Party	Candidate	Votes	%
Republican	Adam Kinzinger	32,233	63.7
Republican	Dave White	5,257	10.4
Republican	David McAloon	4,880	9.6
Republican	Henry Meers Jr.	4,555	9.0
Republican	Darrel Miller	3,701	7.3
Total votes		50,626	100

2010 Illinois's 11th congressional district general election
Party	Candidate	Votes	%
Republican	Adam Kinzinger	129,108	57.4
Democratic	Debbie Halvorson (incumbent)	96,019	42.6
Total votes		225,127	100

=== 2012 ===
2012 Illinois's 16th congressional district Republican Party primary
Party	Candidate	Votes	%
Republican	Adam Kinzinger	45,546	53.9
Republican	Don Manzullo (incumbent)	38,889	46.1
Total votes		84,435	100

2012 Illinois's 16th congressional district general election
Party	Candidate	Votes	%
Republican	Adam Kinzinger	181,789	61.8
Democratic	Wanda Rohl	112,301	38.2
Total votes		294,090	100

=== 2014 ===
2014 Illinois's 16th congressional district Republican Party primary
Party	Candidate	Votes	%
Republican	Adam Kinzinger (incumbent)	56,593	78.4
Republican	David J. Hale Jr.	15,558	21.6
Total votes		72,151	100

2014 Illinois's 16th congressional district general election
Party	Candidate	Votes	%
Republican	Adam Kinzinger (incumbent)	153,388	70.6
Democratic	Randall Olsen	63,810	29.4
Total votes		217,198	100
Republican hold			

=== 2016 ===
2016 Illinois's 16th congressional district Republican Party primary
Party	Candidate	Votes	%
Republican	Adam Kinzinger (incumbent)	101,421	100
Republican	Colin M. McGroarty	2	nil
Total votes		101,423	100

2016 Illinois's 16th congressional district general election
Party	Candidate	Votes	%
Republican	Adam Kinzinger (incumbent)	259,722	100
Independent	John Burchardt (write-in)	131	nil
Total votes		259,853	100
Republican hold			

=== 2018 ===
2018 Illinois's 16th congressional district general election
Party	Candidate	Votes	%
Republican	Adam Kinzinger (incumbent)	151,254	59.1
Democratic	Sara Dady	104,569	40.9
Independent	John M. Stassi (write-in)	2	nil
Total votes		255,825	100
Republican hold			

=== 2020 ===
2020 Illinois's 16th congressional district general election
Party	Candidate	Votes	%	±%
Republican	Adam Kinzinger (incumbent)	218,839	64.71	+5.6%
Democratic	Dani Brzozowski	119,313	35.28	−5.6%
Write-in		7	0.00	N/A
Total votes		338,159	100	
Republican hold				

== Personal life ==
The Wisconsin Red Cross named Kinzinger its 2006 "Hero of the Year" for wrestling a knife-wielding man to the ground and disarming him. The man had cut the throat of a woman on a street in downtown Milwaukee, Wisconsin. Recalling the event in an interview, Kinzinger said, "The whole time, it was, to me, kind of a done deal that I was going to get stabbed in the process, but I knew that this wasn't something I could wake up to ... every day with that memory that I watched her die." The woman survived. For this act Kinzinger also received the United States Air Force Airman's Medal and the National Guard's Valley Forge Cross for Heroism.

Kinzinger was ranked 5th on The Hill's 2011 annual "50 Most Beautiful People" list, which ranks anyone who regularly works on Capitol Hill.

Kinzinger was engaged to Air Force Captain Riki Meyers, a fellow pilot, in 2011; they broke their engagement in 2012. Kinzinger became engaged to Sofia Boza-Holman, a former aide to John Boehner and aide to Vice President Mike Pence, in June 2019. They married on February 16, 2020. Their son, Christian Adam Kinzinger, was born in January 2022. According to his book, they have relocated from Illinois to Houston, Texas.

=== Shooting incident ===
In October 2024, Kinzinger was involved in an incident at a shooting range in Missouri during an event with then US Senate Candidate Lucas Kunce. Kinzinger and Kunce both shot AR-15s at steel targets from a very close distance. While Kunce was shooting, a bullet fragment accidentally hit a TV reporter. Kinzinger and Kunce performed first aid on the reporter, who was then sent to the hospital with a minor wound to his arm. The local sheriff's office determined the incident was an accident and no charges were filed.

Kinzinger was criticized by gun safety experts including Steve Hendrick, who operates Shield Firearms Training in Kansas City. Hendrick was not present at the event, but after reviewing photos he said that a range of 10 yards would have been too close to shoot steel with an AR-15.

== Books ==
- Kinzinger, Adam; D'Antonio, Michael (2023). Renegade: Defending Democracy and Liberty in Our Divided Country. New York City: The Open Field/Penguin Life. ISBN 9780593654163. OCLC 1388322897.

U.S. House of Representatives
Preceded by Debbie Halvorson	Member of the U.S. House of Representatives from Illinois's 11th congressional district 2011–2013	Succeeded by Bill Foster
Preceded by Don Manzullo	Member of the U.S. House of Representatives from Illinois's 16th congressional district 2013–2023	Succeeded by Darin LaHood
Party political offices
Preceded by Charlie Dent; Jo Ann Emerson	Chair of the Tuesday Group; 2013–2017; Served alongside: Erik Paulsen (2013–2015), Charlie Dent (2013–2017), Bob Dold (2015–2017)	Succeeded by Charlie Dent; John Katko; Elise Stefanik
U.S. order of precedence (ceremonial)
Preceded by Peter Roskam as Former U.S. Representative	Order of precedence of the United States as Former U.S. Representative	Succeeded by Mo Brooks as Former U.S. Representative
