= USS Sutter County =

LST-542-class landing ship tank

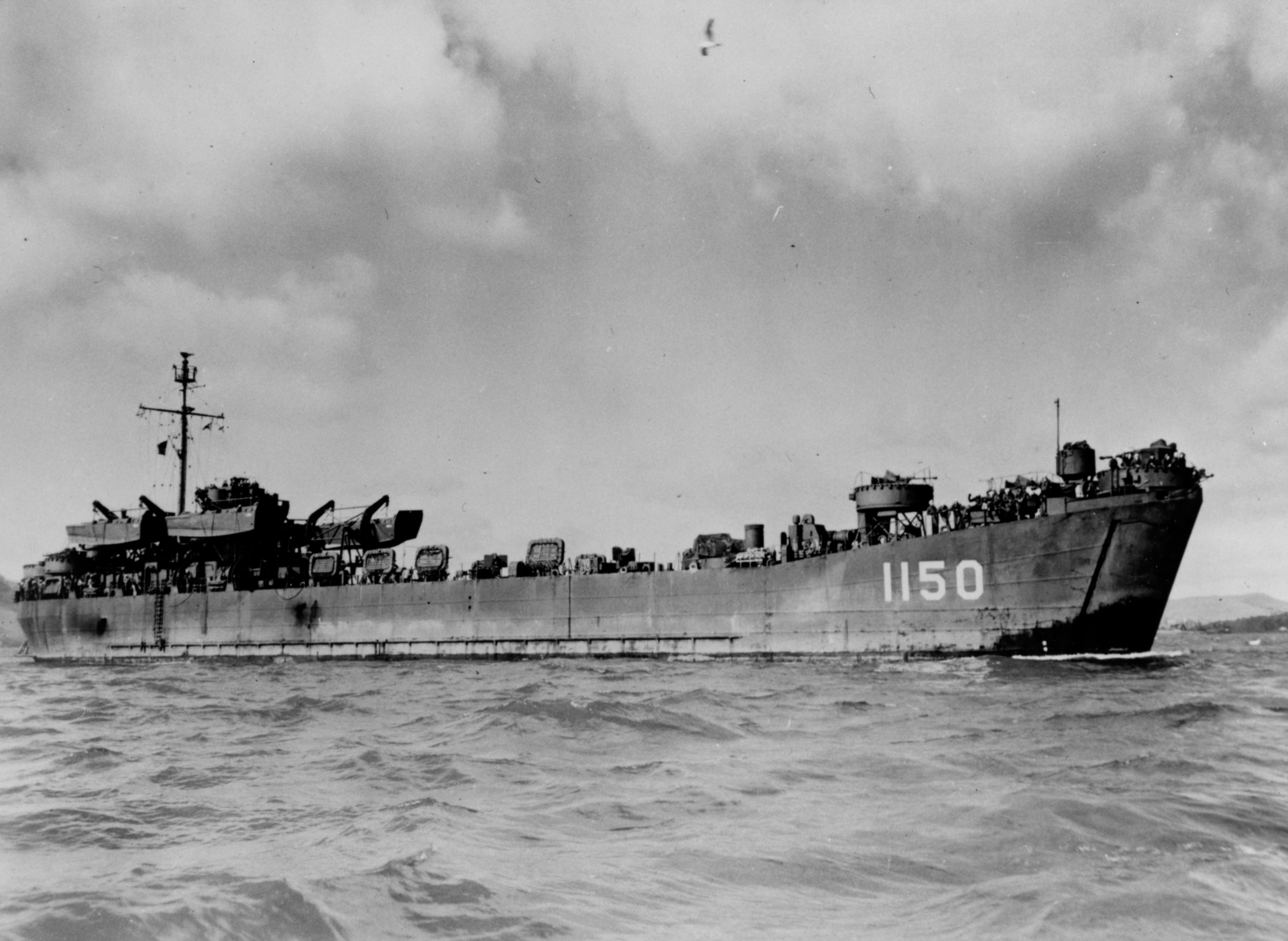
- USS Sutter County between 1946-1947

History

United States
- Name: LST-1150
- Builder: Chicago Bridge and Iron Co., Seneca
- Laid down: 15 February 1945
- Launched: 30 May 1945
- Sponsored by: Mrs Marie S. Budd
- Commissioned: 20 June 1945
- Decommissioned: 13 September 1946
- Renamed: Sutter County
- Namesake: Sutter County
- Recommissioned: 16 April 1966
- Decommissioned: 12 March 1971
- Stricken: 15 September 1974
- Identification: Pennant number: LST-1150; IMO number: 7621451
- Nickname(s): The Rambling Ram
- Fate: Ran aground and wrecked in 1986
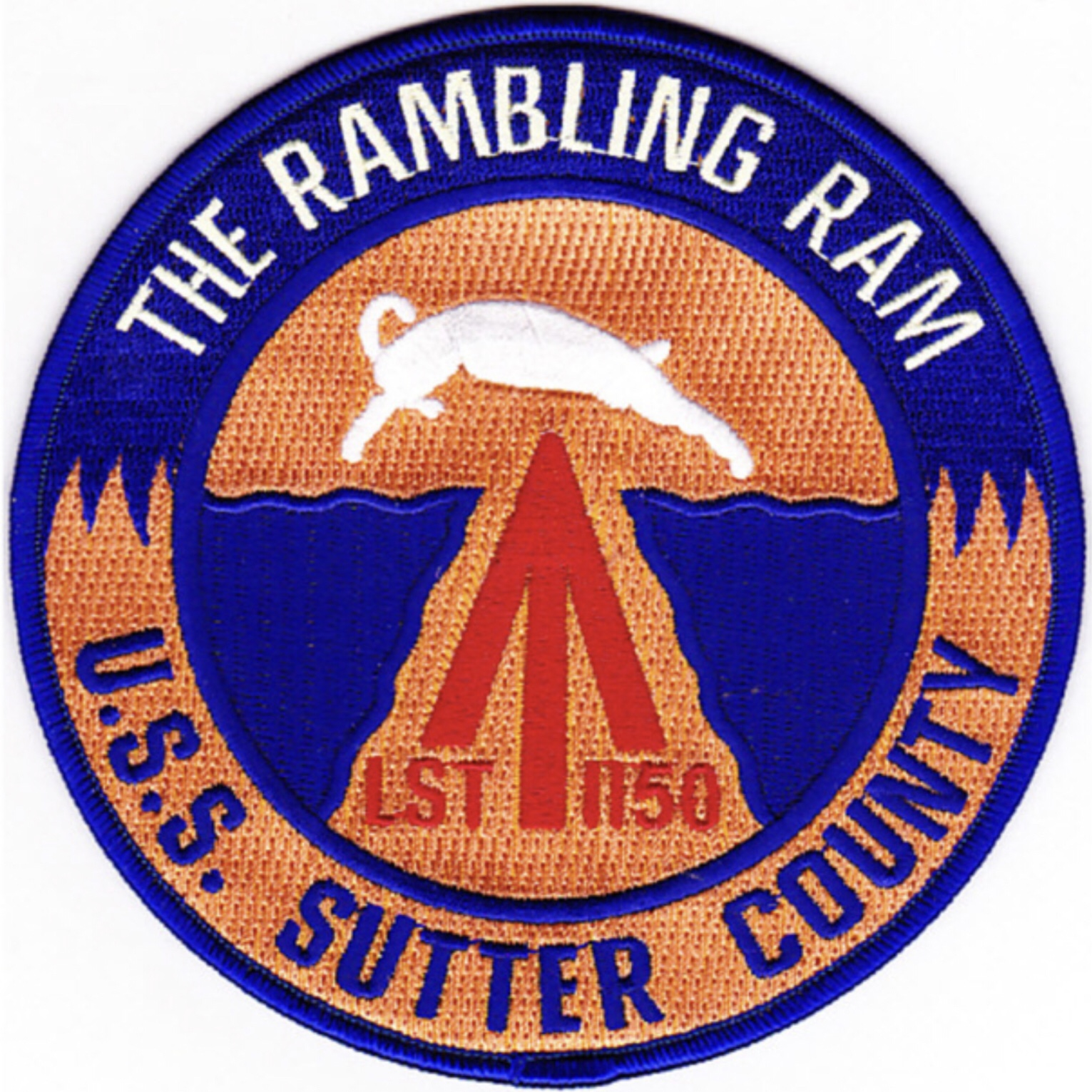
- Badge

General characteristics
- Class & type: LST-542-class tank landing ship
- Displacement: 1,625 long tons (1,651 t) light; 4,080 long tons (4,145 t) full
- Length: 328 ft (100 m)
- Beam: 50 ft (15 m)
- Draft: Unloaded : 2 ft 4 in (0.71 m) forward; 7 ft 6 in (2.29 m) aft; Loaded : 8 ft 2 in (2.49 m) forward; 14 ft 1 in (4.29 m) aft
- Propulsion: 2 × General Motors 12-567 diesel engines, two shafts, twin rudders
- Speed: 12 knots (22 km/h; 14 mph)
- Boats & landing craft carried: 2 × LCVPs
- Troops: 16 officers, 147 enlisted men
- Complement: 7 officers, 104 enlisted men
- Armament: 8 × 40 mm guns; 12 × 20 mm guns

USS Sutter County (LST-1150) was a LST-542-class tank landing ship in the United States Navy during World War II.

== Construction and commissioning ==
LST-1150 was laid down on 15 February 1945 at Chicago Bridge and Iron Company, Seneca, Illinois. Launched on 30 May 1945 and commissioned on 20 June 1945. She was first commissioned with a Coast Guard crew.

During World War II, LST-1150 was assigned to the Asiatic-Pacific theater. She was assigned to occupation and China in the Far East from 20 October to 3 December 1945.

She was decommissioned on 13 September 1946 to be mothballed in the Pacific Reserve Fleet Columbia river.

On 1 July 1955, she was given the name Sutter County (LST-1150).

On 16 April 1966, she was recommissioned back into the navy after a complete refit at Willamette Iron and Steel Company, Portland, Oregon.

As the United States joined the Vietnam War, she joined the Vietnamese Counteroffensive Phase II from 17 July to 26 September and 20 to 30 October 1966 and Vietnamese Counteroffensive Phase III from 1 June to 2 July 1967, 31 August to 18 September 1967 and 2 November 7 December 1967. Vietnamese Counteroffensive Phase IV from 3 April to 9 June 1968 and the Vietnamese Counteroffensive Phase V from 14 July to 21 August 1968. Tet 69/Counteroffensive, 24 April to 31 May 1969 and 12 to 27 October 1968. Vietnam Winter Spring-1970 from 3 to 10 November 1969, 28 November to 14 December 1969, 28 December 1969 to 5 January 1970 and 21 to 28 February 1970. Vietnamese Counteroffensive Phase VII from 20 July to 19 August 1970.

She was decommissioned on 12 March 1971 at Orange, Texas and mothballed at the Atlantic Reserve Fleet Orange struck from the Naval Register on 15 September 1974.

On 1 November 1975, she was sold and used by the Defense Reutilization and Marketing Service (DRMS) and later sold to Lehigh Coal & Navigation Company, New York with the names MV Marland II.

In 1979, she was renamed MV Amal. after being sold to a Saudi Arabian Abdullaziz, Hussein T., Jeddah.

On 10 November 1986, the ship has run aground and was wrecked off Jeddah.

== Awards ==
LST-1150 have earned the following awards:

- Navy Unit Commendation
- Navy Meritorious Unit Commendation
- American Campaign Medal
- Asiatic-Pacific Campaign Medal
- World War II Victory Medal
- Navy Occupation Service Medal (with Asia clasp)
- National Defense Service Medal
- Vietnam Service Medal (7 battle stars)
- Republic of Vietnam Gallantry Cross Unit Citation (14 battle stars)
- Republic of Vietnam Campaign Medal
