= The Last Republican =

2024 American documentary film

- Directed by: Steve Pink
- Produced by: Steve Pink
- Starring: Adam Kinzinger
- Cinematography: Josh Salzman
- Edited by: Ted Feldman
- Music by: Logan Nelson
- Release date: September 7, 2024 (TIFF)
- Running time: 90 minutes
- Country: United States
- Language: English

The Last Republican is a 2024 American documentary film produced and directed by Steve Pink. It follows the last term of Republican U.S. Congressman Adam Kinzinger.

== Reception ==
On the review aggregator website Rotten Tomatoes, 87% of 15 critics' reviews are positive, with an average rating of 7.7/10.

In a positive review, Frank Scheck of The Hollywood Reporter wrote, "It's a sign of the truly bizarre political times in which we live that the new documentary about former Illinois congressman Adam Kinzinger was made not by any of the usual filmmaking suspects. The Last Republican, receiving its world premiere at the Toronto International Film Festival, wasn't helmed by, say, Michael Moore, Errol Morris, or Barbara Kopple, but rather Steve Pink. It only makes sense when you find out that one of Pink's previous directorial efforts, Hot Tub Time Machine, is Kinzinger's favorite film." After being officially released on Apple TV in October 2025, it became the most popular documentary on the service for that week.
