= Steve Pink =

American actor, director and writer (born 1966)

- Born: February 3, 1966 (age 60); United States
- Occupations: Actor, Director, Writer, Producer, Filmworker

Steve Pink (born February 3, 1966) is an American actor, director and writer. He is the director of the comedy films Accepted and Hot Tub Time Machine, and the co-writer of the films Grosse Pointe Blank and High Fidelity.

== Life and career ==
He is an alumnus of Evanston Township High School, Columbia College Chicago, and University of California-Berkeley (graduating in 1989 with a degree in Peace and Conflict Studies), and a contemporary of John Cusack, Jeremy Piven, and D.V. DeVincentis. Together, Pink, Cusack, and DeVincentis formed a production company, New Crime Productions, which produced both Grosse Pointe Blank and High Fidelity.

In 2010, he directed Hot Tub Time Machine, and its sequel Hot Tub Time Machine 2 in 2015. He was also a producer on the 20th Century Fox release Knight and Day, starring Tom Cruise and Cameron Diaz. In 2024, he wrote, directed, and produced a documentary on Rep. Adam Kinzinger's turbulent last year in Congress, called The Last Republican.

== Filmography ==
Year	Title	Director	Producer	Writer
1997	Grosse Pointe Blank	No	Yes	Yes
2000	High Fidelity	No	Yes	Yes
2006	Accepted	Yes	No	No
2006	I Want Someone to Eat Cheese With	No	Yes	No
2010	Knight and Day	No	Yes	No
2010	Hot Tub Time Machine	Yes	No	No
2014	About Last Night	Yes	No	No
2015	Hot Tub Time Machine 2	Yes	No	No
2021	The Wheel	Yes	Yes	No
2024	The Last Republican	Yes	Yes	Yes
2025	Terrestrial	Yes	No	No
TBA	What the F*ck Is My Password?	Yes	Yes	No

Acting credits

Year	Title	Role
1985	The Sure Thing	Football Player
1986	Touch and Go	Green
1986	One More Saturday Night	Dogman
1988	Dangerous Curves	Ralphie
1992	Bob Roberts	Penn State Protester
1997	Grosse Pointe Blank	Terry Rostand
2001	America's Sweethearts	Limo Driver
