= Veteran Emergency Medical Technician Support Act of 2013 =

- Long title: To amend the Public Health Service Act to provide grants to States to streamline State requirements and procedures for veterans with military emergency medical training to become civilian emergency medical technicians.
- Announced in: the 113th United States Congress
- Sponsored by: Rep. Adam Kinzinger (R, IL-16)
- Number of co-sponsors: 1

Codification
- Acts affected: Public Health Service Act
- U.S.C. sections affected: 42 U.S.C. 243 et seq., 42 U.S.C. 294a(j)(1)
- Agencies affected: w:Department of Health and Human Services, Congress
- Authorizations of appropriations: $1,000,000 over fiscal years 2014 through 2018

Legislative history
- Introduced in the House as H.R. 235 by Rep. Adam Kinzinger (R-IL) on Jan 14, 2013; Committee consideration by United States House Committee on Energy and Commerce, United States House Energy Subcommittee on Health; Passed the House on February 12, 2013 (Agreed to by voice vote)

The Veteran Emergency Medical Technician Support Act of 2013 (H.R. 235) is a bill in the 113th United States Congress. The bill was introduced on January 14, 2013, by Rep. Adam Kinzinger (R-IL). It passed the United States House of Representatives on February 12, 2013, by a voice vote, indicating that it was generally non-controversial.

== Background ==
In the 112th United States Congress a nearly identical bill was introduced and passed by the House. That bill, H.R. 4124, was passed by the House on September 19, 2012, and referred to the Senate. It died in the Senate when the new congressional session started and will need to go through the entire legislative process again before ever becoming law.

== Procedural history ==
=== Introduction ===
The Bill was introduced on January 14, 2013, by Representative Adam Kinzinger (R-IL). Rep. Lois Capps (D-CA) was an original co-sponsor. Fourteen additional Representatives became co-sponsors between January 22 and February 4. The long title of the Bill is "To amend the Public Health Service Act to provide grants to States to streamline State requirements and procedures for veterans with military emergency medical training to become civilian emergency medical technicians."

=== Committee ===
On January 14, 2013, the Bill was referred to the House Committee on Energy and Commerce. On January 18, the Committee referred it to the Subcommittee on Health. After debating and examining the bill, the House Committee on Energy and Commerce referred the bill out of committee to the full House. The bill was accompanied by Report 113-5, a report in which the Committee explains the bill, provides information about hearings the Committee held, and gives an estimated budget. This was done on February 4, 2013, and the Bill was immediately placed on the Union Calendar, Calendar No. 3.

=== Passage in the House ===
The Bill was considered on the floor of the House on February 12, 2013. The bill was debated under a suspension of the rules and agreed to by a voice vote.

=== Referral to the Senate ===
The Bill was referred to the Senate on February 13, 2013. It was sent to the United States Senate Committee on Health, Education, Labor, and Pensions for consideration.

== Provisions/Elements of the bill ==
=== Summary ===
The Bill would amend the Public Health Service Act to direct the Secretary of Health and Human Services (HHS) to establish a demonstration program for states with a shortage of emergency medical technicians (EMTs) to streamline state requirements and procedures to assist veterans who completed military EMT training while serving in the Armed Forces to meet state EMT certification, licensure, and other requirements.

=== Congressional Budget Office report ===
The Congressional Budget Office released a report on the bill, as ordered by the House Committee on Energy and Commerce on January 22, 2013.

The following is the summary of the Congressional Budget Office's report:

H.R. 235 would authorize grants to states for streamlining state certification and licensing requirements for veterans to become licensed or certified emergency medical technicians (EMT).
The bill would authorize the appropriation of $1 million and CBO estimates that implementing the bill would cost $1 million over the 2014-2018 period, assuming the appropriation of the authorized amount. Pay-as-you-go procedures do not apply to this legislation because it would not affect direct spending or revenues.
The bill contains no intergovernmental or private-sector mandates as defined in the Unfunded Mandates Reform Act (UMRA).

== Support for the bill ==
Supporters of the bill considered it a "common sense" measure that would help returning veterans find work by ending the requirement that emergency personnel retake civilian certification courses when they already held similar certifications from the military.

The National Association of Emergency Medical Technicians sponsored "EMS on the Hill Day" during which NAEMT staff members and other EMT professionals spoke to congressional staffers and Representatives about the bill, asking them to support it.
