= Hot Tub Time Machine 2 =

2015 film by Steve Pink

- Theatrical release poster
- Directed by: Steve Pink
- Written by: Josh Heald
- Based on: Characters by Josh Heald
- Produced by: Andrew Panay
- Starring: Rob Corddry; Craig Robinson; Clark Duke; Adam Scott; Chevy Chase
- Cinematography: Declan Quinn
- Edited by: Jamie Gross
- Music by: Christophe Beck
- Production companies: Paramount Pictures; Metro-Goldwyn-Mayer Pictures
- Distributed by: Paramount Pictures
- Release date: February 20, 2015
- Running time: 93 minutes
- Country: United States
- Language: English
- Budget: $14–18 million
- Box office: $13.1 million

Hot Tub Time Machine 2 is a 2015 American science fiction comedy film directed by Steve Pink and written by Josh Heald. The film stars Rob Corddry, Craig Robinson, Clark Duke, Adam Scott, Chevy Chase, and Gillian Jacobs. It is the sequel to the 2010 film Hot Tub Time Machine. The film was released by Paramount Pictures on February 20, 2015. John Cusack, who played Adam Yates and produced the first film, does not return in the theatrical cut, but has a brief cameo in the unrated version. The film grossed $13.1 million against a budget of $14–18 million, and reviews were generally unfavorable, deeming it "unfunny" and "unoriginal".

== Plot ==
Five years after the events of the first film, Lou Dorchen and Nick Webber have become rich and famous, with Lou becoming a billionaire and Nick being a successful musician/singer. At Lou's celebratory party, Lou is shot in the groin. Jacob (Lou's son) and Nick drag him to the hot tub time machine and activate it to travel back in time to find and stop the killer. When they awaken, they find themselves 10 years in the future, where Jacob is in charge of Lou's mansion. After determining that they are in an alternate timeline where Lou's killer is from this future, they go to their friend Adam Yates's home, only to meet his son Adam Yates Stedmeyer (Adam Jr.), who is engaged to a woman named Jill.

Lou suspects his nemesis Gary Winkle is the killer, but he learns Gary actually made his own fortune from some land that Lou could have purchased. They party at Gary's nightclub, where Adam Jr. takes hallucinogens for the first time. The next day, they attend the popular television game show Choozy Doozy, where contestant Nick is required to have virtual reality sex with a man. As Lou suggested the idea, he is obliged to participate, but uses his "lifeline" to switch with Adam Jr. Essentially, Jacob becomes disillusioned with the misadventures and leaves the group to get drunk at Gary's club and to then commit suicide by jumping off an extremely high building. Lou makes amends with him and prevents his suicide.

When the guys see a news report where Brad, an employee of Lougle, invents nitrotrinadium, the ingredient that activates the hot tub time machine, they suspect he is the killer. At Adam Jr.'s wedding, Jacob talks with Brad and realizes he is not the killer, but that he invented the chemical after being inspired by Lou's words. Jill, who is upset about Adam Jr.'s partying, has sex with Lou. But when Adam Jr. finds out, he steals the nitrotrinadium and goes back to the past, revealing himself as the killer. Jacob, Nick, and Lou return to the mansion, but are too late to stop Adam Jr. As the guys sit in defeat, Jacob realizes that because the chemical has appeared in the past after an encounter with the Repairman, it now exists in the future. They return to the present and stop Adam Jr. from shooting Lou after Lou apologizes to him.

Following this incident, Nick apologizes to Courtney as Lou tells his wife he wants to go to drug rehabilitation for his drug abuse. Adam Jr. meets Jill for the first time. The more optimistic Jacob approaches Sophie (his girlfriend in the future) and convinces her to join him in a relationship. As Lou, Nick, Jacob, and Adam Jr. return to the hot tub, Lou's head is shot off by another Lou (or Adam Sr. in the unrated version) dressed in a minuteman costume. Patriot Lou informs them there are multiple Lous anyway and invites them to "make America happen."

During the closing credits, the guys are seen exploiting the time machine to change history.

== Cast ==
- Rob Corddry as Lou Dorchen
- Craig Robinson as Nick Webber
- Clark Duke as Jacob Dorchen
- Adam Scott as Adam Yates Stedmeyer (Adam Jr.)
- Chevy Chase as Hot Tub Repairman
- Gillian Jacobs as Jill
- Collette Wolfe as Kelly Dorchen
- Bianca Haase as Sophie
- Jason P. Jones as Gary Winkle
- Kellee Stewart as Courtney Webber
- Kumail Nanjiani as Brad
- Josh Heald as Terry
- Gretchen Koerner as Susan
- Lisa Loeb as herself
- Jessica Williams as herself
- Bruce Buffer as himself

John Cusack, who played Adam Yates in Hot Tub Time Machine (2010), has a cameo appearance in the unrated version appearing in the scene mentioned above. Christian Slater also has a cameo role as Choozy Doozy host Brett McShaussey.

== Production ==
Principal photography began in New Orleans on June 5, 2013. On January 31, 2014, it was announced that the film would be released on December 25, 2014. On October 14, 2014, the film's release date was pushed back to February 20, 2015.

According to Corddry, the working title for the film was Hot Tub Time Machine 3: Because Hot Tub Time Machine 2 Hasn't Happened Yet, a joke in reference to the movie's time travel plot. However, Paramount's marketing department believed that title would be confusing to audiences and named the film Hot Tub Time Machine 2.

== Release ==
Hot Tub Time Machine 2 grossed $6 million on its opening weekend, finishing seventh at the box office.

The film grossed a total of $13.1 million, against a $14–18 million budget, which was less than the opening weekend of the first film.

== Reception ==
Unlike its predecessor, Hot Tub Time Machine 2 was a critical failure. On Rotten Tomatoes, the film has an approval rating of 14% based on 110 reviews, and an average rating of 3.4/10. The website's critical consensus reads, "A shallow dip overflowing with juvenile humor, Hot Tub Time Machine 2 is a lukewarm sequel that's healthiest to avoid." Metacritic gives it a score of 29 out of 100 based on reviews from 31 critics, indicating "generally unfavorable" reviews. Audiences surveyed by CinemaScore, gave the film a grade of "C−" on an F to A+ scale.

Reviews were generally negative, with The Hollywood Reporter calling it a "flop-sweaty cash grab that gives a bad name to sequels in which key talent has jumped ship." Jordan Hoffman of The Guardian disliked the film so much he said it tainted the memory of the first film.

Justin Chang of Variety called the film "boorish and crass, homophobic and misogynistic, the very definition of sloppy seconds", which he found typical of the genre. However, he was surprised "that it somehow manages to send you out of the theater feeling tickled rather than sullied".

GLAAD singled out the film for its "outright offensive depictions of LGBT people" and defamatory homophobic humor.

=== Accolades ===
The movie resulted in two nominations at the Golden Raspberry Award. Chevy Chase was nominated as Worst Supporting Actor, and the movie was nominated as Worst Prequel, Remake, Rip-off or Sequel.

== Home media ==
Hot Tub Time Machine 2 was released on DVD and Blu-ray on May 19, 2015, with a "Hotter and Wetter Unrated Cut" on the Blu-ray that includes additional scenes including a cameo from John Cusack that was cut from the film's theatrical edition.

== Future ==
In a 2022 interview with Craig Robinson, he said that screenwriter Josh Heald who wrote the first two films has an "incredible" story for a third film that has been discussed. Heald explained in an April 2024 interview that he hopes he would get the opportunity to do a third one someday, and said that the film would be about multiverses and also about going to the past and the future.
