= Seneca station (Illinois) =

Seneca
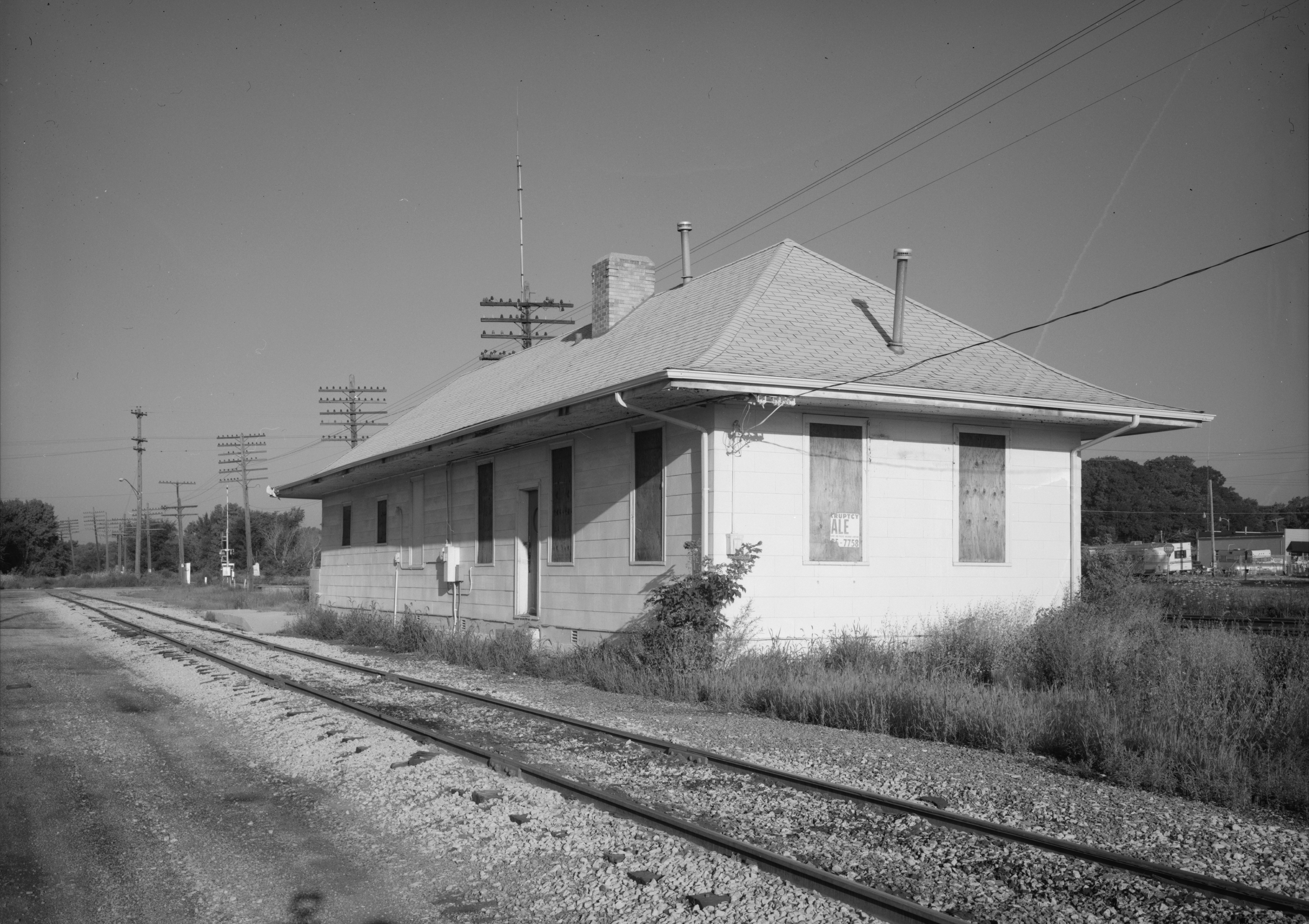
- Seneca station in 1986.

General information
- Location: IL 170 (Main Street); Seneca, Illinois
- Coordinates: 41°19′11″N 88°36′34″W
- System: Rock Island Line passenger rail station
- Owner: track owned by CSX Transportation
- Platforms: 1 side platform
- Tracks: 1 (changes to 2 just east of station)

Construction
- Structure type: at-grade

Services
Preceding station	Chicago, Rock Island and Pacific Railroad	Following station
Former services
Marseilles toward Colorado Springs	Main Line	Stockdale toward Chicago
Location

Seneca station was a Chicago, Rock Island and Pacific Railroad station in the small town of Seneca, Illinois. It was located on the south side of the track, just west of Main Street. The station is just west of a passing siding, one of only a few on the CSX New Rock Subdivision. The tracks also form a wye with a branch line to the Illinois River starting there. That line is rented by CSX, which has a lease with the International Mining Company until 2030.
