= H.R. 4801 (113th Congress) =

- Long title: To require the Secretary of Energy to prepare a report on the impact of thermal insulation on both energy and water use for potable hot water.
- Announced in: the 113th United States Congress
- Sponsored by: Rep. Adam Kinzinger (R, IL-16)
- Number of co-sponsors: 1

Codification
- Agencies affected: United States Department of Energy

Legislative history
- Introduced in the House as H.R. 4801 by Rep. Adam Kinzinger (R, IL-16) on June 5, 2014; Committee consideration by United States House Committee on Energy and Commerce

The bill H.R. 4801 is a bill that would require the United States Secretary of Energy to prepare a report on the effects that thermal insulation has on both energy consumption and systems for providing potable water in federal buildings.

The bill was introduced into the United States House of Representatives during the 113th United States Congress.

== Background ==
Thermal insulation is the reduction of heat transfer (the transfer of thermal energy between objects of differing temperature) between objects in thermal contact or in range of radiative influence. Thermal insulation can be achieved with specially engineered methods or processes, as well as with suitable object shapes and materials. Heat flow is an inevitable consequence of contact between objects of differing temperature. Thermal insulation provides a region of insulation in which thermal conduction is reduced or thermal radiation is reflected rather than absorbed by the lower-temperature body.

== Provisions of the bill ==
The bill would require the Department of Energy to submit a report to Congress about the possibility of using thermal insulation in federal buildings as way to save energy and water. The report would have to include a short term and long term (20 years) projection on any energy and water savings the addition of a thermal insulation system would save.

== Congressional Budget Office report ==
This summary is based largely on the summary provided by the Congressional Budget Office, as ordered reported by the House Committee on Energy and Commerce on June 10, 2014. This is a public domain source.

H.R. 4801 would require the United States Secretary of Energy to prepare a report, within one year of enactment, on the effects that thermal insulation has on both energy consumption and systems for providing potable water in federal buildings. Based on information from the United States Department of Energy about the cost of similar analyses, the Congressional Budget Office (CBO) estimates that completing the required report would cost less than $500,000; those costs would be subject to the availability of appropriated funds. H.R. 4801 would not affect direct spending or revenues; therefore, pay-as-you-go procedures do not apply.

H.R. 4801 contains no intergovernmental or private-sector mandates as defined in the Unfunded Mandates Reform Act and would not affect the budgets of state, local, or tribal governments.

== Procedural history ==
H.R. 4801 was introduced into the United States House of Representatives on June 5, 2014, by Rep. Adam Kinzinger (R, IL-16). The bill was referred to the United States House Committee on Energy and Commerce. The committee passed the bill on June 10, 2014. The bill was scheduled to be voted on under a suspension of the rules on June 23, 2014.

== Debate and discussion ==
Rep. Kinzinger, who introduced the bill, argued that "with the federal government being the single largest consumer of energy in the country, doing our best to maximize the potential savings from improved insulation systems is a commonsense step I think everybody can agree on."

Rep. Jerry McNerney (D-CA), who co-sponsored the bill, said that "it is important for us to look for ways to save taxpayer money and ensure the federal government is doing its part to preserve our natural resources." McNerney also argued that it would be a good way to collect data so that "we can use the findings from this study and make sure we are doing everything we can in both federal and private buildings to maximize energy and water efficiency."

The Alliance to Save Energy (ASE) supported the bill, calling it a step "in the right direction" and saying that they "are hopeful energy efficiency can once again be an area of common ground between parties."

The National Insulation Association supported the bill. The Central States Insulation Association supported the bill and promised to "collaborate with our allies on Capitol Hill to work to pass this legislation."

== See also ==
- List of bills in the 113th United States Congress
