= Marseilles station =

Marseilles
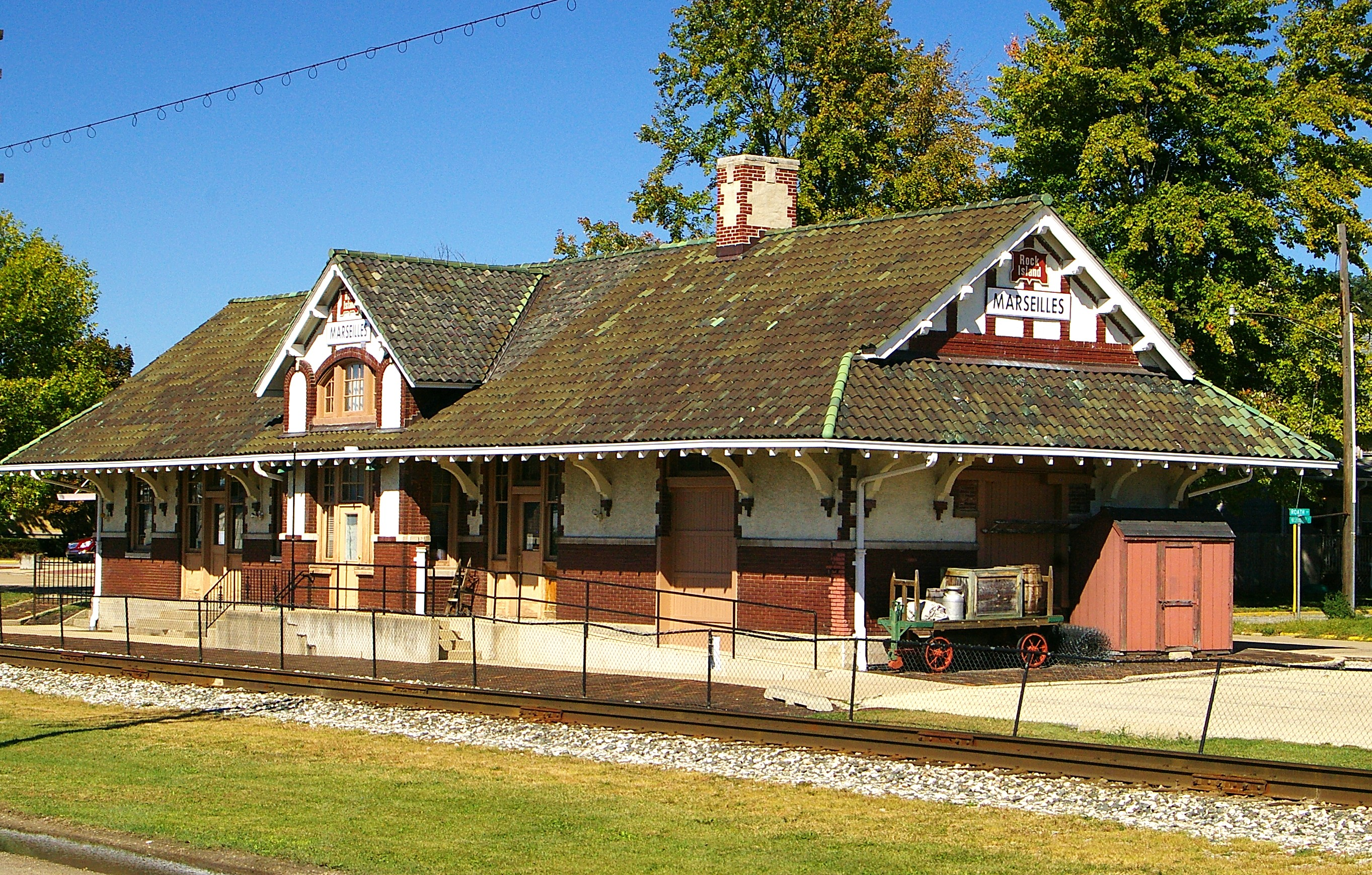

General information
- Location: 150 Washington Street, Marseilles, Illinois 61341
- System: Former Rock Island Line passenger rail station

History
- Opened: 1867
- Rebuilt: 1917

Former services
Preceding station	Chicago, Rock Island and Pacific Railroad	Following station
Ottawa toward Colorado Springs	Main Line	Seneca toward Chicago
- Chicago, Rock Island and Pacific Railroad Depot
- U.S. National Register of Historic Places
- Location within Illinois Location within the United States
- Location: 150 Washington St., Marseilles, Illinois
- Coordinates: 41°19′44″N 88°42′21″W
- Area: less than one acre
- Built: 1917
- Architect: T.S. Peak
- Architectural style: American Craftsman
- NRHP reference No.: 95001239
- Added to NRHP: November 7, 1995
Location

The Chicago, Rock Island and Pacific Depot in Marseilles, Illinois is a historic train station built in 1917. It was in operation as a rail depot until 1974. The depot was added to the U.S. National Register of Historic Places in 1995.

== History ==
The Marseilles Chicago, Rock Island and Pacific Depot was constructed in 1917 after citizens in the city won a 40-year battle with the railroad resulting in a U.S. circuit court ordering a new station to be built. The 1917 station replaced a smaller, wooden station built in 1867. The station was in operation until 1974 and was sold to a private business owner in 1984.

Since 2016, the depot has been home to the Marseilles Museum, with several exhibits dedicated to its history.

== Architecture ==
The depot is about 90 feet (27 m) by 25 feet (7.6 m) and built on a rectangular plan. It has two center bays, on either side of the building, one of which functioned as a ticket office. The structure was designed and built by T. S. Peak, a Chicago builder and cast in the American Craftsman architectural style. Despite having undergone extensive interior remodeling the building retains a high degree of its exterior architectural integrity.

== Historic significance ==
The depot was a locally significant transportation hub which facilitated the shipment of people and goods to and from Marseilles along the Rock Island and LaSalle Line, which became the Chicago, Rock Island and Pacific Railroad. The railroad, which parallels the Illinois and Michigan Canal from Chicago to Peru, brought an end to passenger service along the canal due to its success. The Chicago, Rock Island and Pacific Depot in Marseilles was added to the National Register of Historic Places on November 7, 1995.
