= Middle East Conflicts Wall Memorial =

Monument in Marseilles, Illinois

- 41.324756°N 88.711649°W
- Location: Marseilles, Illinois
- Dedicated to: Servicemen and women who gave their lives in any of the Middle East conflicts since 1967
- Website: middleeastconflictswallmemorial.org

The Middle East Conflicts Wall Memorial is a monument in Marseilles, Illinois, which commemorates the U.S. servicemen and women in who died during all Middle East conflicts since 1967.

It is the first US war monument to be dedicated during the conflict that caused the deaths of the servicemen and women it commemorates.

"The founders Tony Cutrano and Jerry Kuczera spearheaded this project to ensure that those sacrificing their lives for our freedom were given the proper recognition for the selfless service to our great country."
