= Seneca, Illinois =

- Village
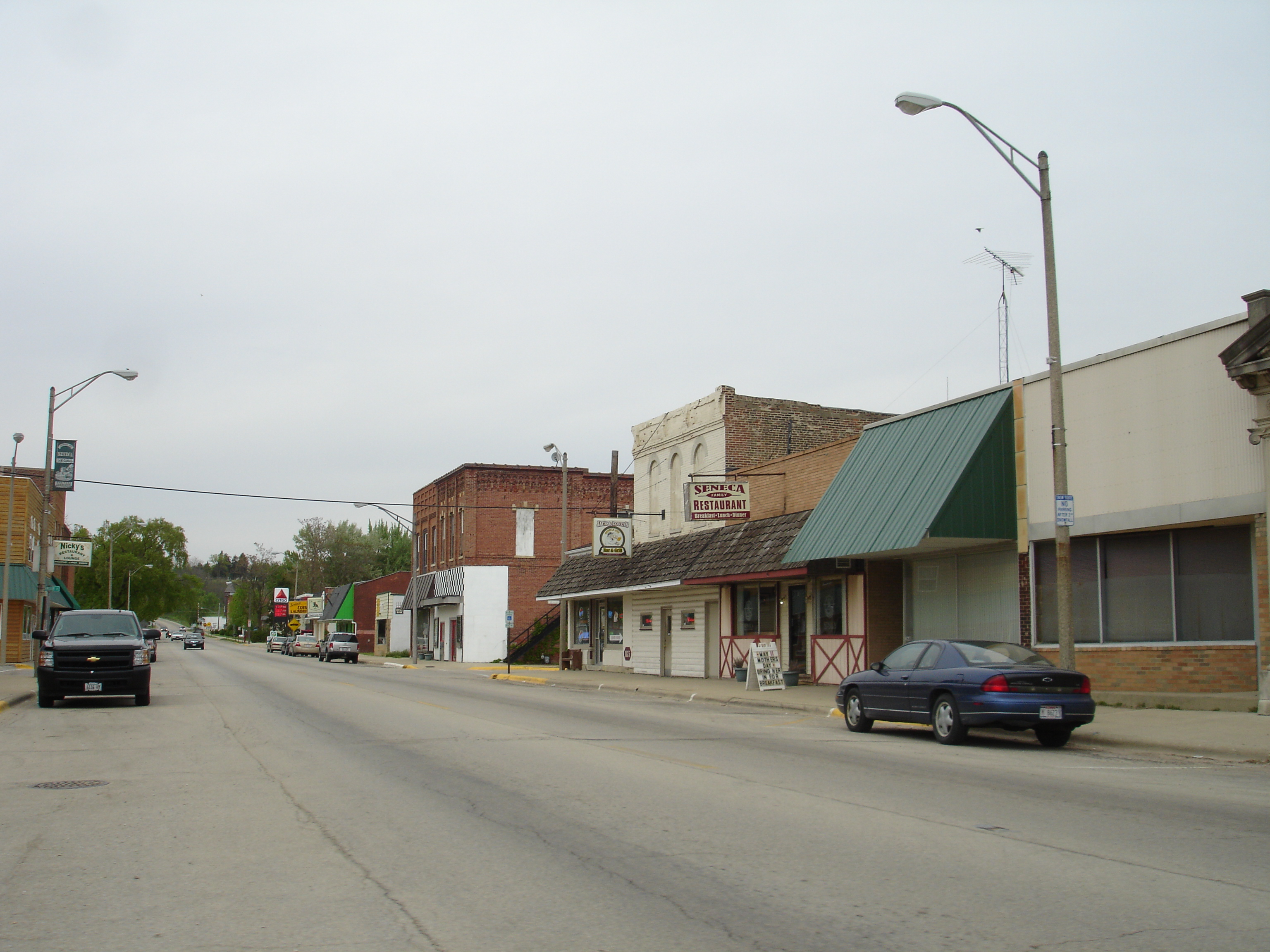
- Business district in Seneca

- Location of Seneca in Grundy County, Illinois.
- Coordinates: 41°18′50″N 88°35′30″W
- Country: United States
- State: Illinois
- Counties: LaSalle, Grundy
- Townships: Manlius, Brookfield, Erienna, Norman

Area
  - Total: 6.58 sq mi (17.03 km^{2})
  - Land: 6.21 sq mi (16.08 km^{2})
  - Water: 0.37 sq mi (0.95 km^{2})
- Elevation: 610 ft (190 m)

Population (2020)
  - Total: 2,353
  - Density: 378.9/sq mi (146.31/km^{2})
- Time zone: UTC-6 (CST)
  - Summer (DST): UTC-5 (CDT)
- ZIP code: 61360
- Area code: 815
- FIPS code: 17-68640
- GNIS feature ID: 2399784
- Website: senecail.org

Seneca is a village in LaSalle and Grundy counties in the U.S. state of Illinois. The population was 2,353 at the 2020 census, down from 2,371 at the 2010 census.

The LaSalle County portion of Seneca is part of the Ottawa, IL Micropolitan Statistical Area, while the small portion that lies in Grundy County is part of the Chicago metropolitan area.

== History ==
A French missionary by the name of Father Gabriel de la Ribourde brought Catholicism to the Seneca area 175 years before St. Patrick's Parish was founded. In 1680, he was traveling with an exploratory party from Quebec when he was ambushed and killed by a band of Kickapoo Indians. A wooden cross marks the spot where Illinois’ first martyr to the Catholic faith is believed to have died (which is located next to St. Patricks Catholic Church).

Seneca was first settled by Jeremiah Crotty, an entrepreneur and contractor who helped build the Illinois and Michigan Canal. Crotty built the first residence in 1850 and established the town in 1854 with a post office in his name. Residents retained the name Crotty Town until 1957, when they incorporated the town as Seneca. Before 1957 Seneca was known as Crotty in paper but known locally as Seneca.

The village of Seneca, formerly named Crotty after its founder, Jeremiah Crotty, was incorporated in 1865. The town was created during the construction of the Illinois and Michigan Canal for which Crotty was a contractor.

The Rock Island Railroad and the Illinois River also supported the creation and business of our town. Seneca is most known for its contributions during World War II when Chicago Bridge and Iron operated the Prairie Shipyard. 157 Landing Ship, Tanks (LST) were built here.

== Geography ==
According to the 2021 census gazetteer files, Seneca has a total area of 6.58 square miles (17.04 km^{2}), of which 6.21 square miles (16.08 km^{2}) (or 94.42%) is land and 0.37 square miles (0.96 km^{2}) (or 5.58%) is water.

Most of the village lies in LaSalle County, although a small portion extends into west central Grundy County. In the 2000 census, all of Seneca's 2,082 residents lived in LaSalle County. According to 2006 population estimates, 2,082 of the village's 2,087 residents (99.8%) lived in LaSalle County and 5 (0.2%) lived in Grundy County.

Seneca is located on the Illinois River, which connects Lake Michigan to the Mississippi River.

== Demographics ==
Historical population
Census	Pop.	Note	%±
1880	738		—
1890	1,190		61.2%
1900	1,036		−12.9%
1910	1,005		−3.0%
1920	994		−1.1%
1930	1,185		19.2%
1940	1,235		4.2%
1950	1,435		16.2%
1960	1,719		19.8%
1970	1,781		3.6%
1980	2,098		17.8%
1990	1,878		−10.5%
2000	2,053		9.3%
2010	2,371		15.5%
2020	2,353		−0.8%
U.S. Decennial Census

=== 2020 census ===
As of the 2020 census, Seneca had a population of 2,353. The median age was 37.9 years. 25.2% of residents were under the age of 18 and 14.6% of residents were 65 years of age or older. For every 100 females there were 104.6 males, and for every 100 females age 18 and over there were 101.3 males age 18 and over.

0.0% of residents lived in urban areas, while 100.0% lived in rural areas.

There were 864 households in Seneca, of which 33.2% had children under the age of 18 living in them. Of all households, 54.1% were married-couple households, 18.1% were households with a male householder and no spouse or partner present, and 20.6% were households with a female householder and no spouse or partner present. About 21.4% of all households were made up of individuals and 10.1% had someone living alone who was 65 years of age or older. The average household size was 2.85 and the average family size was 2.67.

The population density was 357.82 inhabitants per square mile (138.16/km^{2}). There were 939 housing units at an average density of 142.79 per square mile (55.13/km^{2}). Of the housing units, 8.0% were vacant. The homeowner vacancy rate was 2.8% and the rental vacancy rate was 9.8%.

Racial composition as of the 2020 census
Race	Number	Percent
White	2,140	90.9%
Black or African American	20	0.8%
American Indian and Alaska Native	13	0.6%
Asian	11	0.5%
Native Hawaiian and Other Pacific Islander	2	0.1%
Some other race	27	1.1%
Two or more races	140	5.9%
Hispanic or Latino (of any race)	103	4.4%

=== Income and poverty ===
The median income for a household in the village was $74,907, and the median income for a family was $87,813. Males had a median income of $62,895 versus $24,083 for females. The per capita income for the village was $34,832. About 13.1% of families and 15.2% of the population were below the poverty line, including 23.7% of those under age 18 and none of those age 65 or over.

== Economy ==
Seneca is located on the Illinois River, which connects the Mississippi River to Lake Michigan. Seneca hosts three marinas on the south side of the Illinois River, as well as a public boat launch on the north side of the Illinois River. Seneca is rich with history with the Illinois and Michigan Canal running through the center of the city's downtown area.

== Education ==
Seneca has three schools split into two school districts: Seneca Grade School North Campus (pre-kindergarten - 4th grade) and Seneca Grade School South Campus (grades 5 - 8) make up District 170, while Seneca Township High School] (grades 9 - 12) is the lone school in District 160. Seneca High School houses students from Seneca as well as students from the nearby towns of Mazon, Verona, Kinsman, and Marseilles.

== Notable people ==
- Dave Callahan, outfielder with the Cleveland Naps, born in Seneca
- John Tracy Ellis, Catholic church historian, born in Seneca

== See also ==
- Seneca Grain Elevator
- Seneca Station (Illinois)
