= Jeremy W. Peters =

American journalist

- Born: Royal Oak, Michigan, United States
- Education: University of Michigan
- Occupations: Reporter, Author
- Employer: The New York Times

Jeremy W. Peters is an American reporter and author for The New York Times. He has covered three presidential elections for the newspaper, most recently the 2020 presidential election. He is an MSNBC contributor, and has also appeared on Washington Week on PBS. In February 2022, he published his first book, Insurgency: How Republicans Lost Their Party and Got Everything They Ever Wanted, which was selected as a New York Times Editor's Choice and was reviewed in The Washington Post and The Guardian.

Peters is gay and regularly writes on LGBTQ issues.

== Early life and education ==
Jeremy W. Peters was born in Royal Oak, Michigan.

Peters earned his bachelor's degree in 2002 from the University of Michigan. He wrote for The Michigan Daily from 1999 to 2002.

== Career ==
Peters began contributing to The New York Times while completing his degree. as a freelancer. He then worked for two years in the Virgin Islands for The Virgin Islands Daily News before returning to the Times as a reporter for the business and national desks based in Detroit. In 2009, while assigned to the Albany bureau, he was part of the team that won the Pulitzer Prize for breaking news, for its coverage of the sex scandal that resulted in the resignation of Gov. Eliot Spitzer.

His coverage of the Republican Party and the conservative movement for The Times became the basis for his book, Insurgency, which the Crown Publishing Group acquired in 2017. Peters was one of several Times journalists featured in the 2018 Showtime documentary, The Fourth Estate.

=== Coverage of trans rights ===
Peters' coverage of trans rights has been criticized by both people who support trans rights and those who oppose it. In 2023, the NewsGuild of New York sent a letter to the New York Times criticizing its biased coverage of transgender issues. In response Peters organized a letter signed by other New York Times reporters denying that their reporting was biased.
