= Marseilles, Illinois =

Marseilles
- City
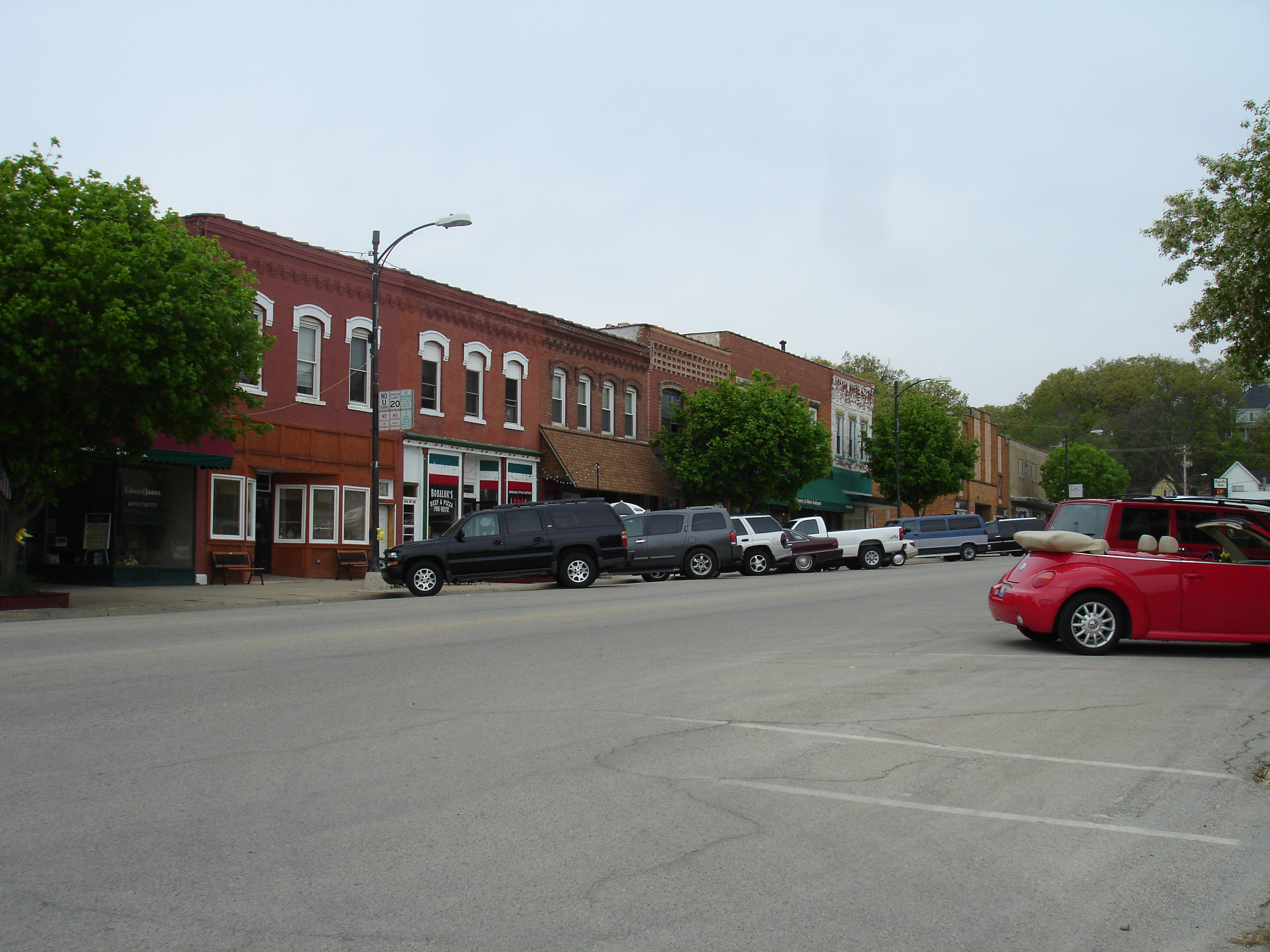
- Buildings in the city's business district
- Etymology: Marseille, France
- Location of Marseilles in LaSalle County, Illinois.
- Coordinates: 41°17′30″N 88°41′28″W
- Country: United States
- State: Illinois
- County: LaSalle
- Townships: Manlius, Rutland, Brookfield

Government
  - Mayor: Jim Hollenbeck

Area
  - Total: 9.57 sq mi (24.78 km^{2})
  - Land: 9.08 sq mi (23.52 km^{2})
  - Water: 0.49 sq mi (1.26 km^{2})
- Elevation: 663 ft (202 m)

Population (2020)
  - Total: 4,845
  - Density: 533.6/sq mi (206.01/km^{2})
- Time zone: UTC-6 (CST)
  - Summer (DST): UTC-5 (CDT)
- ZIP code: 61341
- Area code: 815
- FIPS code: 17-47150
- GNIS feature ID: 2395020
- Website: cityofmarseilles.com

Marseilles (/mɑːrˈseɪlz/ mar-SAYLZ) is a city in LaSalle County, Illinois, United States. An Illinois River town, the population was 4,845 at the 2020 census, down from 5,094 at the 2010 census. It is part of the Ottawa, IL Micropolitan Statistical Area.

== History ==
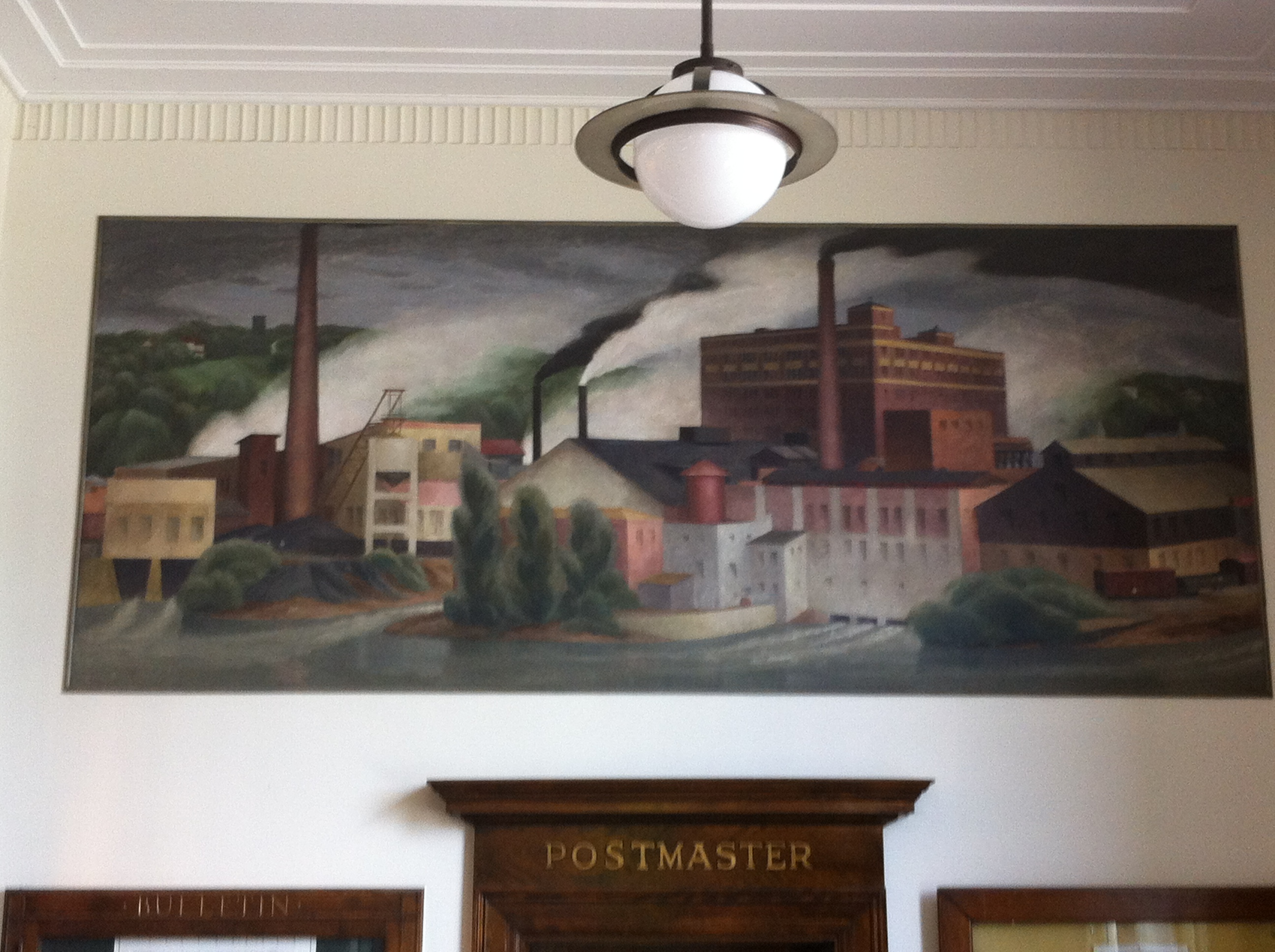
1938 WPA mural, "Industrial Marseilles" by Avery Johnson. in Marseilles Post Office

Lovell Kimball arrived at the area along the Illinois River known as the Grand Rapids in 1833 from Watertown, New York. Kimball, aware that the Illinois-Michigan Canal Bill had passed and the canal would eventually reach the rapids, hired a surveyor to lay out a town. Kimball called the town Marseilles in reference to the French city of Marseille as he hoped it would become a similar industrial center in Illinois. Marseilles, pronounced the same as the French city, was officially platted on June 3, 1835; the plat was revised twice for railroad and canal right-of-ways.

=== Nabisco Building ===
In 1921 the National Biscuit Company (Nabisco) built an eight-story corrugated cardboard box production plant in Marseilles, the largest industrial building in the state (outside of Chicago) at the time, and the first air-conditioned factory in the Midwest. Nabisco was a major employer in the area but ceased production at the plant in 2002.

=== Middle East Conflicts Wall Memorial ===
In 2004 the Middle East Conflicts Wall Memorial was dedicated to the service men and women who gave their lives fighting in US wars anywhere in the Middle East. The Middle East Conflicts Wall Memorial is the first US memorial to servicemen dedicated while an actual war was ongoing. Currently, the earliest names on the wall are from 1967 commemorating the deaths during the USS Liberty incident.

Andrew Bacevich, American historian, felt that all presidential candidates should visit Marseilles, commenting that "Just as there are all-but-mandatory venues in Iowa and New Hampshire where candidates are expected to appear, why not make Marseilles, Illinois, one as well. Let all of the candidates competing to oust Donald Trump from the White House (their ranks now approaching two dozen) schedule at least one campaign stop at the Middle East Conflicts Wall, press entourage suitably in tow." Andrew Bacevich lost his son in Iraq, his son's name is included in the monument.

=== Museums ===
In 2016, Marseilles resident Seattle Sutton founded a community museum, located in the Chicago, Rock Island and Pacific Railroad building. Its collection includes historical items from the Nabisco factory, other Marseilles businesses, and archived recordings of Marseilles war veterans.

== Geography ==
Marseilles is located at the head of a rapids in the Illinois River historically known as "the Grand Rapids" or the "Rapids of Maninumba".

According to the 2010 census, Marseilles has a total area of 9.206 square miles (23.84 km^{2}), of which 8.72 square miles (22.58 km^{2}) (or 94.72%) is land and 0.486 square miles (1.26 km^{2}) (or 5.28%) is water.

== Demographics ==
Historical population
Census	Pop.	Note	%±
1870	758		—
1880	1,882		148.3%
1890	2,210		17.4%
1900	2,559		15.8%
1910	3,291		28.6%
1920	3,391		3.0%
1930	4,292		26.6%
1940	4,455		3.8%
1950	4,514		1.3%
1960	4,347		−3.7%
1970	4,320		−0.6%
1980	4,766		10.3%
1990	4,811		0.9%
2000	4,655		−3.2%
2010	5,094		9.4%
2020	4,845		−4.9%
U.S. Decennial Census

=== 2020 census ===
As of the 2020 census, Marseilles had a population of 4,845. The median age was 40.5 years. 22.3% of residents were under the age of 18 and 18.4% of residents were 65 years of age or older. For every 100 females there were 97.8 males, and for every 100 females age 18 and over there were 94.5 males age 18 and over.

The population density was 533.6 inhabitants per square mile (206.0/km^{2}), and the housing unit density was 237.5 per square mile (91.7/km^{2}).

95.8% of residents lived in urban areas, while 4.2% lived in rural areas.

There were 2,015 households in Marseilles, of which 27.3% had children under the age of 18 living in them. Of all households, 40.1% were married-couple households, 21.6% were households with a male householder and no spouse or partner present, and 27.6% were households with a female householder and no spouse or partner present. About 32.7% of all households were made up of individuals and 13.8% had someone living alone who was 65 years of age or older.

The average household size was 2.33 and the average family size was 2.90.

There were 2,273 housing units, of which 11.4% were vacant. The homeowner vacancy rate was 2.5% and the rental vacancy rate was 6.0%.

Racial composition as of the 2020 census
Race	Number	Percent
White	4,279	88.3%
Black or African American	38	0.8%
American Indian and Alaska Native	23	0.5%
Asian	22	0.5%
Native Hawaiian and Other Pacific Islander	0	0.0%
Some other race	144	3.0%
Two or more races	339	7.0%
Hispanic or Latino (of any race)	347	7.2%

=== Income and poverty ===
The median income for a household in the city was $51,835, and the median income for a family was $69,537. The per capita income was $26,182. 16.0% of families and 20.3% of individuals were below the poverty line, including 32.1% of those under 18 and 7.3% of those over 65.

== See also ==
- William D. Boyce
- William H. Stead
- Chicago, Rock Island and Pacific Railroad Depot (Marseilles, Illinois)
