= Brookfield Township, LaSalle County, Illinois =

Coordinates: 41°15′08″N 88°38′55″W

Brookfield Township
- Township
- Location in LaSalle County

- LaSalle County's location in Illinois
- Country: United States
- State: Illinois
- County: LaSalle
- Established: November 6, 1849

Area
  - Total: 47.59 sq mi (123.3 km^{2})
  - Land: 44.28 sq mi (114.7 km^{2})
  - Water: 3.31 sq mi (8.6 km^{2}) 6.95%

Population (2020)
  - Total: 1,069
  - Density: 24.14/sq mi (9.321/km^{2})
- Time zone: UTC-6 (CST)
  - Summer (DST): UTC-5 (CDT)
- FIPS code: 17-099-08583

Brookfield Township is located in LaSalle County, Illinois. As of the 2020 census, its population was 1,069 and it contained 458 housing units.

== Geography ==
According to the 2021 census gazetteer files, Brookfield Township has a total area of 47.59 square miles (123.26 km^{2}), of which 44.28 square miles (114.68 km^{2}) (or 93.05%) is land and 3.31 square miles (8.57 km^{2}) (or 6.95%) is water.

== Demographics ==
As of the 2020 census there were 1,069 people, 261 households, and 237 families residing in the township. The population density was 22.46 inhabitants per square mile (8.67/km^{2}). There were 458 housing units at an average density of 9.62 per square mile (3.71/km^{2}). The racial makeup of the township was 92.80% White, 0.47% African American, 0.28% Native American, 0.19% Asian, 0.09% Pacific Islander, 1.59% from other races, and 4.58% from two or more races. Hispanic or Latino of any race were 4.49% of the population.

There were 261 households, out of which 27.20% had children under the age of 18 living with them, 77.78% were married couples living together, 13.03% had a female householder with no spouse present, and 9.20% were non-families. 1.90% of all households were made up of individuals, and 0.00% had someone living alone who was 65 years of age or older. The average household size was 3.11 and the average family size was 3.23.

The township's age distribution consisted of 25.9% under the age of 18, 9.6% from 18 to 24, 20.2% from 25 to 44, 28.7% from 45 to 64, and 15.5% who were 65 years of age or older. The median age was 40.4 years. For every 100 females, there were 103.3 males. For every 100 females age 18 and over, there were 98.3 males.

The median income for a household in the township was $70,189, and the median income for a family was $70,848. Males had a median income of $62,188 versus $36,806 for females. The per capita income for the township was $30,169. About 33.3% of families and 36.4% of the population were below the poverty line, including 62.9% of those under age 18 and 0.0% of those age 65 or over.

Historical population
Census	Pop.	Note	%±
2010	1,060		—
2020	1,069		0.8%
U.S. Decennial Census
