= National Register of Historic Places listings in Grundy County, Illinois =

Location of Grundy County in Illinois

This is a list of the National Register of Historic Places listings in Grundy County, Illinois.

This is intended to be a complete list of the properties and districts on the National Register of Historic Places in Grundy County, Illinois, United States. Latitude and longitude coordinates are provided for many National Register properties and districts; these locations may be seen together in a map.

There are 8 properties and districts listed on the National Register in the county.

This National Park Service list is complete through NPS recent listings posted May 22, 2026.

== Current listings ==
	Name on the Register	Image	Date listed	Location	City or town	Description
1	Coleman Hardware Company Building	Coleman Hardware Company Building	August 16, 1994 (#94000980)	100 Nettle St. 41°21′24″N 88°25′45″W	Morris	
2	Dresden Island Lock and Dam Historic District	Dresden Island Lock and Dam Historic District	March 10, 2004 (#04000164)	7521 N. Lock Rd. 41°23′52″N 88°16′56″W	Morris	
3	Illinois and Michigan Canal	Illinois and Michigan Canal	October 15, 1966 (#66000332)	7 miles (11 km) southwest of Joliet on U.S. Route 6, in Channahon State Park; 41°34′11″N 88°04′11″W	Joliet	
4	Mazon Creek Fossil Beds	Mazon Creek Fossil Beds	September 25, 1997 (#97001272)	Benson Rd., 3 mi. SE of Morris; 41°19′38″N 88°21′50″W	Wauponsee Township	
5	Morris Downtown Commercial Historic District	Morris Downtown Commercial Historic District	January 31, 2006 (#05001603)	Liberty St., roughly bounded by the RR, Illinois St., Fulton and Wauponsee Sts and Franklin; 41°21′35″N 88°25′26″W	Morris	
6	Morris Wide Water Canal Boat Site	Morris Wide Water Canal Boat Site	February 4, 2000 (#99001708)	East Washington St. 41°21′59″N 88°24′12″W	Morris	
7	White and Company's Goose Lake Stoneware Manufactury	White and Company's Goose Lake Stoneware Manufactury	August 6, 1998 (#98000982)	5010 N. Jugtown Rd. 41°20′50″N 88°19′19″W	Morris	
8	White and Company's Goose Lake Tile Works	White and Company's Goose Lake Tile Works	August 6, 1998 (#98000976)	5010 N. Jugtown Rd. 41°20′44″N 88°19′02″W	Morris	

== See also ==
- List of National Historic Landmarks in Illinois
- National Register of Historic Places listings in Illinois
