= Greenfield Township, Grundy County, Illinois =

Greenfield Township
- Township
- Location in Grundy County

- Grundy County's location in Illinois
- Coordinates: 41°09′32″N 88°16′26″W
- Country: United States
- State: Illinois
- County: Grundy
- Established: November 6, 1849

Area
  - Total: 18.06 sq mi (46.8 km^{2})
  - Land: 17.32 sq mi (44.9 km^{2})
  - Water: 0.74 sq mi (1.9 km^{2}) 4.08%
- Elevation: 587 ft (179 m)

Population (2020)
  - Total: 991
  - Density: 57.2/sq mi (22.1/km^{2})
- Time zone: UTC-6 (CST)
  - Summer (DST): UTC-5 (CDT)
- ZIP codes: 60407, 60424, 60474, 60961
- FIPS code: 17-063-31381

Greenfield Township is one of seventeen townships in Grundy County, Illinois, USA. As of the 2020 census, its population was 991 and it contained 449 housing units.

== History ==
The Township of Greenfield was organized on 6 November 1849, the Village of East Brooklyn was organized in ____, and the Village of South Wilmington was organized in ____. Villages remain part of the township.

On 10 March 1903, Garfield Township was separated from Greenfield Township. The southeastern portion of the village of Gardner, which is located mainly within Garfield Township, is in Greenfield Township. Garfield was begun centered at an intersection in 18__ prior to the township division.

The social and economic factors which led to the division of the township in 1905 have changed. Modern transportation, technological advances and familial relationships have led to increased cohesiveness between the five main communities within the two townships in the twenty-first century. The high schools are focal points of activity for the entire area. The villages are in many respects neighborhoods within the townships.

== Geography ==
According to the 2021 census gazetteer files, Greenfield Township has a total area of 18.06 square miles (46.78 km^{2}), of which 17.32 square miles (44.86 km^{2}) (or 95.92%) is land and 0.74 square miles (1.92 km^{2}) (or 4.08%) is water.

=== Cities, towns, villages ===
- East Brooklyn
- Gardner (southeast edge)
- South Wilmington

=== Major highways ===
- Illinois Route 17
- Illinois Route 53

== Demographics ==
As of the 2020 census there were 991 people, 397 households, and 264 families residing in the township. The population density was 54.88 inhabitants per square mile (21.19/km^{2}). There were 449 housing units at an average density of 24.87 per square mile (9.60/km^{2}). The racial makeup of the township was 95.56% White, 0.20% African American, 0.00% Native American, 0.00% Asian, 0.00% Pacific Islander, 0.81% from other races, and 3.43% from two or more races. Hispanic or Latino of any race were 3.63% of the population.

There were 397 households, out of which 24.70% had children under the age of 18 living with them, 59.45% were married couples living together, 2.52% had a female householder with no spouse present, and 33.50% were non-families. 25.70% of all households were made up of individuals, and 12.60% had someone living alone who was 65 years of age or older. The average household size was 2.42 and the average family size was 2.98.

The township's age distribution consisted of 24.1% under the age of 18, 6.9% from 18 to 24, 29.2% from 25 to 44, 22.9% from 45 to 64, and 16.9% who were 65 years of age or older. The median age was 37.0 years. For every 100 females, there were 105.8 males. For every 100 females age 18 and over, there were 113.8 males.

The median income for a household in the township was $83,036, and the median income for a family was $91,667. Males had a median income of $71,696 versus $36,136 for females. The per capita income for the township was $36,527. About 1.9% of families and 5.3% of the population were below the poverty line, including 7.3% of those under age 18 and 6.2% of those age 65 or over.

Historical population
Census	Pop.	Note	%±
2000	935		—
2010	997		6.6%
2020	991		−0.6%
U.S. Decennial Census

== School districts ==
- Herscher Community Unit School District 2
- Gardner-South Wilmington High School District #73

== Political districts ==
- Illinois' 11th congressional district
- State House District 75
- State Senate District 38
