= Mazon River =

Physical characteristics
- Source
  - location: Greenfield Township, Grundy County, Illinois
  - coordinates: 41°11′02″N 88°15′13″W
- Mouth
  - location: Confluence with the Illinois River, Morris, Illinois
  - coordinates: 41°21′11″N 88°25′11″W
  - elevation: 489 ft (149 m)
- Length: 28 mi (45 km)
- Discharge
  - location: Coal City, Illinois
  - average: 373 cu/ft. per sec.

Basin features
- Progression: Mazon River → Illinois → Mississippi → Gulf of Mexico
- GNIS ID: 413173

The Mazon River or Mazon Creek (/məˈzɒn/), is a tributary of the Illinois River in the United States. The confluence is near Morris, Illinois.

The Mazon River is associated with the Mazon Creek fossils of the Francis Creek Shale, which are also exposed in strip mines and quarries near the River. This fossil bed includes well-preserved fossils from the Pennsylvanian period of the Paleozoic era and is a world-famous Lagerstätten site.

The Mazon River is approximately 28 miles (45 km) in length, with the West Fork considered the main branch.

The river was named in honor of William Mason, a pioneer settler.

== Cities and counties ==
The following cities, towns and villages are within the Mazon watershed:

- Braidwood
- Coal City
- Dwight
- Gardner
- Mazon
- Morris

The following counties are at least partly drained by the Mazon River:

- Grundy County
- Kankakee County
- Livingston County
- Will County

== See also ==
- List of Illinois rivers
