= Nettle Creek =

Nettle Creek may refer to:

Streams

- Nettle Creek (Grass River), New York, United States
- Nettle Creek (Mad River), Ohio, United States
- Nettle Creek, Innot Hot Springs, Queensland, Australia

Populated places

- Nettle Creek, Illinois, United States, an unincorporated community
- Nettle Creek Township, Grundy County, Illinois
