= Braceville Township =

Braceville Township may refer to:

- Braceville Township, Grundy County, Illinois
- Braceville Township, Ohio
