= Louis Bottino =

US educator and politician (1907–1979)

Louis F. Bottino (May 2, 1907 – April 5, 1979) was an American educator and politician.

Bottino was born in South Wilmington, Illinois. He went to the public schools in South Wilmington and Gardner, Illinois. He graduated from Beloit College and Columbia University. Bottino served in the United States Marine Corps during World War II. He worked as a teacher, coach, and school administrator in Will County, Illinois and Lockport, Illinois. He lived with his wife and family in Lockport, Illinois. Bottino served in the Illinois House of Representatives from 1957 to 1961 and was a Republican.

Bottino served in the 1969-1970 Illinois constitutional convention, where he introduced an unsuccessful amendment that would have ensured equal educational funding statewide.
