= Vienna Township, Grundy County, Illinois =

Vienna Township
- Township
- Location in Grundy County

- Grundy County's location in Illinois
- Coordinates: 41°14′41″N 88°31′55″W
- Country: United States
- State: Illinois
- County: Grundy
- Established: November 6, 1849

Area
  - Total: 35.72 sq mi (92.5 km^{2})
  - Land: 35.69 sq mi (92.4 km^{2})
  - Water: 0.02 sq mi (0.052 km^{2}) 0.06%
- Elevation: 640 ft (195 m)

Population (2020)
  - Total: 666
  - Density: 18.7/sq mi (7.20/km^{2})
- Time zone: UTC-6 (CST)
  - Summer (DST): UTC-5 (CDT)
- ZIP codes: 60437, 60444, 60450, 60479, 61360
- FIPS code: 17-063-77850

Vienna Township is one of seventeen townships in Grundy County, Illinois, USA. As of the 2020 census, its population was 666 and it contained 267 housing units.

== Geography ==
According to the 2021 census gazetteer files, Vienna Township has a total area of 35.72 square miles (92.51 km^{2}), of which 35.69 square miles (92.44 km^{2}) (or 99.94%) is land and 0.02 square miles (0.05 km^{2}) (or 0.06%) is water.

=== Cities, towns, villages ===
- Verona

=== Unincorporated towns ===
- Wauponsee at 41.274477°N 88.494513°W

(This list is based on USGS data and may include former settlements.)

== Demographics ==
As of the 2020 census there were 666 people, 375 households, and 232 families residing in the township. The population density was 18.65 inhabitants per square mile (7.20/km^{2}). There were 267 housing units at an average density of 7.48 per square mile (2.89/km^{2}). The racial makeup of the township was 91.29% White, 0.00% African American, 0.45% Native American, 1.35% Asian, 0.00% Pacific Islander, 3.15% from other races, and 3.75% from two or more races. Hispanic or Latino of any race were 7.06% of the population.

There were 375 households, out of which 23.70% had children under the age of 18 living with them, 44.27% were married couples living together, 12.27% had a female householder with no spouse present, and 38.13% were non-families. 37.30% of all households were made up of individuals, and 5.90% had someone living alone who was 65 years of age or older. The average household size was 2.55 and the average family size was 3.41.

The township's age distribution consisted of 28.4% under the age of 18, 9.2% from 18 to 24, 29.6% from 25 to 44, 24.3% from 45 to 64, and 8.6% who were 65 years of age or older. The median age was 38.2 years. For every 100 females, there were 106.7 males. For every 100 females age 18 and over, there were 117.1 males.

The median income for a household in the township was $87,917, and the median income for a family was $102,625. Males had a median income of $61,641 versus $23,558 for females. The per capita income for the township was $30,388. About 11.2% of families and 14.3% of the population were below the poverty line, including 28.0% of those under age 18 and 6.1% of those age 65 or over.

Historical population
Census	Pop.	Note	%±
2000	646		—
2010	687		6.3%
2020	666		−3.1%
U.S. Decennial Census

== Political districts ==
- Illinois' 11th congressional district
- State House District 75
- State Senate District 38
