= Felix Township, Grundy County, Illinois =

Felix Township
- Township
- Location in Grundy County

- Grundy County's location in Illinois
- Coordinates: 41°18′40″N 88°16′42″W
- Country: United States
- State: Illinois
- County: Grundy
- Established: November 1854

Area
  - Total: 12.02 sq mi (31.1 km^{2})
  - Land: 10.91 sq mi (28.3 km^{2})
  - Water: 1.11 sq mi (2.9 km^{2}) 9.24%
- Elevation: 545 ft (166 m)

Population (2020)
  - Total: 4,438
  - Density: 406.8/sq mi (157.1/km^{2})
- Time zone: UTC-6 (CST)
  - Summer (DST): UTC-5 (CDT)
- ZIP codes: 60416, 60450
- FIPS code: 17-063-25778

Felix Township is one of seventeen townships in Grundy County, Illinois, United States. As of the 2020 census, its population was 4,438 and it contained 1,923 housing units.

== History ==
Felix Township, Grundy County, is named for Felix Grundy, Senator from Tennessee. The township was formed from portions of Wauponsee and Aux Sable townships in November, 1854. Most of old Felix township was partitioned to form Goose Lake Township on September 15, 1897. These early boundary changes occurred mainly due to coal mining activity.

== Geography ==
According to the 2021 census gazetteer files, Felix Township has a total area of 12.02 square miles (31.13 km^{2}), of which 10.91 square miles (28.26 km^{2}) (or 90.76%) is land and 1.11 square miles (2.87 km^{2}) (or 9.24%) is water.

=== Cities, towns, villages ===
- Carbon Hill
- Coal City (north quarter)
- Diamond (west quarter)

=== Unincorporated towns ===
- Eileen at 41.294199°N 88.271174°W

(This list is based on USGS data and may include former settlements.)

== Demographics ==
As of the 2020 census there were 4,438 people, 1,842 households, and 1,173 families residing in the township. The population density was 369.25 inhabitants per square mile (142.57/km^{2}). There were 1,923 housing units at an average density of 160.00 per square mile (61.78/km^{2}). The racial makeup of the township was 90.20% White, 0.77% African American, 0.36% Native American, 0.59% Asian, 0.07% Pacific Islander, 2.01% from other races, and 6.02% from two or more races. Hispanic or Latino of any race were 6.96% of the population.

There were 1,842 households, out of which 32.00% had children under the age of 18 living with them, 50.27% were married couples living together, 10.26% had a female householder with no spouse present, and 36.32% were non-families. 33.40% of all households were made up of individuals, and 14.00% had someone living alone who was 65 years of age or older. The average household size was 2.34 and the average family size was 2.98.

The township's age distribution consisted of 26.1% under the age of 18, 6.0% from 18 to 24, 25% from 25 to 44, 21.6% from 45 to 64, and 21.1% who were 65 years of age or older. The median age was 38.7 years. For every 100 females, there were 102.3 males. For every 100 females age 18 and over, there were 100.9 males.

The median income for a household in the township was $52,600, and the median income for a family was $57,458. Males had a median income of $56,842 versus $31,306 for females. The per capita income for the township was $32,785. About 10.7% of families and 9.9% of the population were below the poverty line, including 15.7% of those under age 18 and 3.1% of those age 65 or over.

Historical population
Census	Pop.	Note	%±
2000	3,919		—
2010	4,427		13.0%
2020	4,438		0.2%
U.S. Decennial Census

== School districts ==
- Coal City Community Unit School District 1

== Political districts ==
- Illinois' 11th congressional district
- State House District 75
- State Senate District 38
