= Highland Township, Grundy County, Illinois =

Highland Township
- Township
- Location in Grundy County

- Grundy County's location in Illinois
- Coordinates: 41°09′14″N 88°32′07″W
- Country: United States
- State: Illinois
- County: Grundy
- Established: November 6, 1849

Area
  - Total: 36.04 sq mi (93.3 km^{2})
  - Land: 36.00 sq mi (93.2 km^{2})
  - Water: 0.04 sq mi (0.10 km^{2}) 0.10%
- Elevation: 643 ft (196 m)

Population (2020)
  - Total: 256
  - Density: 7.11/sq mi (2.75/km^{2})
- Time zone: UTC-6 (CST)
  - Summer (DST): UTC-5 (CDT)
- ZIP codes: 60420, 60437, 60470, 60479
- FIPS code: 17-063-34657

Highland Township is one of seventeen townships in Grundy County, Illinois, USA. As of the 2020 census, its population was 256 and it contained 121 housing units.

== Geography ==
According to the 2021 census gazetteer files, Highland Township has a total area of 36.04 square miles (93.34 km^{2}), of which 36.00 square miles (93.24 km^{2}) (or 99.90%) is land and 0.04 square miles (0.10 km^{2}) (or 0.10%) is water.

=== Cities, towns, villages ===
- Kinsman

=== Extinct towns ===
- Highland Town at 41.1942°N 88.491732°W

(These towns are listed as "historical" by the USGS.)

== Demographics ==
As of the 2020 census there were 256 people, 116 households, and 87 families residing in the township. The population density was 7.10 inhabitants per square mile (2.74/km^{2}). There were 121 housing units at an average density of 3.36 units per square mile (1.30 units/km^{2}). The racial makeup of the township was 93.36% White, 1.56% African American, 0.00% Native American, 0.00% Asian, 0.00% Pacific Islander, 0.39% from other races, and 4.69% from two or more races. Hispanic or Latino of any race were 5.47% of the population.

There were 116 households, out of which 37.90% had children under the age of 18 living with them, 71.55% were married couples living together, 3.45% had a female householder with no spouse present, and 25.00% were non-families. 13.80% of all households were made up of individuals, and 6.90% had someone living alone who was 65 years of age or older. The average household size was 2.50 and the average family size was 2.90.

The township's age distribution consisted of 13.8% under the age of 18, 19.3% from 18 to 24, 16.5% from 25 to 44, 37.2% from 45 to 64, and 13.1% who were 65 years of age or older. The median age was 47.2 years. For every 100 females, there were 97.3 males. For every 100 females age 18 and over, there were 104.9 males.

The median income for a household in the township was $89,615, and the median income for a family was $133,542. Males had a median income of $64,444 versus $24,196 for females. The per capita income for the township was $37,408. About 1.1% of families and 0.7% of the population were below the poverty line, including none of those under age 18 and none of those age 65 or over.

Historical population
Census	Pop.	Note	%±
2000	332		—
2010	288		−13.3%
2020	256		−11.1%
U.S. Decennial Census

== Political districts ==
- Illinois' 11th congressional district
- State House District 75
- State Senate District 38
