= South Wilmington, Illinois =

South Wilmington
- Village
- Location of South Wilmington in Grundy County, Illinois.
- Coordinates: 41°10′28″N 88°16′46″W
- Country: United States
- State: Illinois
- County: Grundy

Area
  - Total: 0.49 sq mi (1.27 km^{2})
  - Land: 0.49 sq mi (1.27 km^{2})
  - Water: 0 sq mi (0.00 km^{2})
- Elevation: 587 ft (179 m)

Population (2020)
  - Total: 710
  - Density: 1,443.4/sq mi (557.29/km^{2})
- Time zone: UTC-6 (CST)
  - Summer (DST): UTC-5 (CDT)
- ZIP code: 60474
- Area codes: 815 and 779
- FIPS code: 17-71370
- GNIS feature ID: 2399862
- Website: villageofsouthwilmington.com

South Wilmington is a village in Grundy County, Illinois, United States. The population was 710 at the 2020 census.

Although the name might indicate proximity to the city of Wilmington, South Wilmington is approximately 11 miles (18 km) southwest of Wilmington, and is separated from it by several communities, including Gardner, Braceville, Godley, and Braidwood.

== History ==
South Wilmington came into existence August 23, 1900. The first election for village officers was held September 10, 1899, and the first set of officers elected were: Robert McXulty, St., president; Mike Finn, clerk; Walter Ferguson, treasurer; Charles McLean, constable; William Walker, street commissioner; Levi Simms, police magistrate, and William Purdy, Martin Ferrero. Patrick Corrigan, Hugh Young and John Hammer, trustees.

The family of Mr. Gibson Simpson were the first to locate at South Wilmington, moving into a house taken there from Braidwood that had belonged to Ed Blandey. The second family was that of Patrick Corrigan, who came to take charge of the hotel which was built by the C. W. and C. Coal Company, it being the first to be put in South Wilmington. In 1899 the coal company commenced to build new houses and sell them to their employees, and a great many were moved in from the surrounding towns of Braceville, Braidwood, Coal City, and Clarke City.

A meeting of the citizens was held in the fall of 1899 and donations were asked for the commencement of a school for the benefit of the few children here. School commenced that same fall, being held in an old store building which had been moved in on Third Avenue. Miss Carrie Peart was employed as the first teacher. The miners would pay a fee of twenty-five cents per week to operate the school and to pay Miss Carrie Peart. The people responded so generously to the request for funds that by the fall of 1900, a 4-room schoolhouse was ready in District 74, and in May 1902, four more rooms were added.

The first religious services held in South Wilmington were by the Baptist Sunday School in the fall of 1900. They were conducted in what was known as the Prophet Building, which was moved from Gardner. Rev. J. Blodgett and John C. Wilson organized it. and F. E. Floyd was the first superintendent. Later, a church building was moved from Braceville to host the Baptist services. in 1901. Rev. J. Blodgett was the first pastor. The church was organized the same year, but only remained by itself a short time, becoming a mission of Gardner, until February 6, 1910, when it became once more a separate church.

== Geography ==
According to the 2021 census gazetteer files, South Wilmington has a total area of 0.49 square miles (1.27 km^{2}), all land.

== Demographics ==
Historical population
Census	Pop.	Note	%±
1900	711		—
1910	2,403		238.0%
1920	1,362		−43.3%
1930	722		−47.0%
1940	642		−11.1%
1950	662		3.1%
1960	730		10.3%
1970	725		−0.7%
1980	747		3.0%
1990	698		−6.6%
2000	621		−11.0%
2010	681		9.7%
2020	710		4.3%
U.S. Decennial Census

As of the 2020 census there were 710 people, 297 households, and 186 families residing in the village. The population density was 1,443.09 inhabitants per square mile (557.18/km^{2}). There were 314 housing units at an average density of 638.21 per square mile (246.41/km^{2}). The racial makeup of the village was 95.49% White, 0.00% African American, 0.00% Native American, 0.00% Asian, 0.00% Pacific Islander, 0.99% from other races, and 3.52% from two or more races. Hispanic or Latino of any race were 4.23% of the population.

There were 297 households, out of which 24.6% had children under the age of 18 living with them, 53.20% were married couples living together, 3.37% had a female householder with no husband present, and 37.37% were non-families. 28.62% of all households were made up of individuals, and 13.80% had someone living alone who was 65 years of age or older. The average household size was 2.99 and the average family size was 2.36.

The village's age distribution consisted of 25.8% under the age of 18, 6.1% from 18 to 24, 29.9% from 25 to 44, 20.9% from 45 to 64, and 17.4% who were 65 years of age or older. The median age was 35.7 years. For every 100 females, there were 100.6 males. For every 100 females age 18 and over, there were 111.8 males.

The median income for a household in the village was $75,156, and the median income for a family was $90,833. Males had a median income of $71,875 versus $35,000 for females. The per capita income for the village was $35,967. About 2.7% of families and 7.3% of the population were below the poverty line, including 9.4% of those under age 18 and 8.2% of those age 65 or over.

== Education ==
Most of the village limits is in the South Wilmington Consolidated School District 74, while a portion of the village limits is in the Gardner Community Consolidated School District 72C. All of the village is in the Gardner-South Wilmington Township High School District.

== Notable person ==
Louis Bottino (1907–1979), Illinois state representative and educator, was born in South Wilmington in 1907.
