= Goose Lake Township, Grundy County, Illinois =

Goose Lake Township
- Township
- Location in Grundy County

- Grundy County's location in Illinois
- Coordinates: 41°21′18″N 88°18′39″W
- Country: United States
- State: Illinois
- County: Grundy
- Established: September 15, 1897

Area
  - Total: 29.90 sq mi (77.4 km^{2})
  - Land: 24.92 sq mi (64.5 km^{2})
  - Water: 4.98 sq mi (12.9 km^{2}) 16.67%
- Elevation: 515 ft (157 m)

Population (2020)
  - Total: 1,755
  - Density: 70.43/sq mi (27.19/km^{2})
- Time zone: UTC-6 (CST)
  - Summer (DST): UTC-5 (CDT)
- ZIP codes: 60416, 60444, 60450, 60481
- FIPS code: 17-063-30549

Goose Lake Township is one of seventeen townships in Grundy County, Illinois, USA. As of the 2020 census, its population was 1,755 and it contained 811 housing units.

== Geography ==
According to the 2021 census gazetteer files, Goose Lake Township has a total area of 29.90 square miles (77.44 km^{2}), of which 24.92 square miles (64.54 km^{2}) (or 83.33%) is land and 4.98 square miles (12.90 km^{2}) (or 16.67%) is water.

=== Cities, towns, villages ===
- Channahon (southwest edge)
- Coal City (small portion)

=== Unincorporated towns ===
- Divine at 41.385865°N 88.295342°W

(This list is based on USGS data and may include former settlements.)

=== Ghost Town ===
- Jugtown at 41.359045°N 88.325350°W

=== Cemeteries ===
The township contains these two cemeteries: Holderman and Short.

=== Rivers ===
- Kankakee River
- Illinois River
- Mazon River

== Demographics ==
As of the 2020 census there were 1,755 people, 536 households, and 459 families residing in the township. The population density was 58.70 inhabitants per square mile (22.66/km^{2}). There were 811 housing units at an average density of 27.12 per square mile (10.47/km^{2}). The racial makeup of the township was 94.47% White, 0.11% African American, 0.06% Native American, 0.46% Asian, 0.00% Pacific Islander, 0.68% from other races, and 4.22% from two or more races. Hispanic or Latino of any race were 3.08% of the population.

There were 536 households, out of which 28.20% had children under the age of 18 living with them, 64.18% were married couples living together, 21.46% had a female householder with no spouse present, and 14.37% were non-families. 9.90% of all households were made up of individuals, and 3.50% had someone living alone who was 65 years of age or older. The average household size was 2.22 and the average family size was 2.32.

The township's age distribution consisted of 13.2% under the age of 18, 2.0% from 18 to 24, 16.3% from 25 to 44, 43.3% from 45 to 64, and 25.3% who were 65 years of age or older. The median age was 54.5 years. For every 100 females, there were 113.1 males. For every 100 females age 18 and over, there were 103.9 males.

The median income for a household in the township was $111,094, and the median income for a family was $113,264. Males had a median income of $99,464 versus $63,388 for females. The per capita income for the township was $67,762. None of the population was below the poverty line.

Historical population
Census	Pop.	Note	%±
2000	1,898		—
2010	1,674		−11.8%
2020	1,755		4.8%
U.S. Decennial Census

== School districts ==
- Coal City Community Unit School District 1

== Political districts ==
- Illinois's 16th congressional district
- State House District 75
- State Senate District 38
