= William G. Stratton State Park =

State park in Grundy County, Illinois

- IUCN category III (natural monument or feature)
- Location within Illinois Location within the United States
- Location: Grundy County, Illinois, United States
- Nearest city: Morris, Illinois
- Coordinates: 41°21′11″N 88°25′04″W
- Governing body: Illinois Department of Natural Resources

William G. Stratton State Park is an Illinois state park in Morris, Grundy County, Illinois, United States. It is named after Illinois Governor William Stratton, and was developed in 1959 to provide public boating access to the Illinois River. It features motorboat and jet-ski landing areas, and is bounded by the Illinois and Michigan Canal State Trail to the north and the Illinois River to the south.
