= Felix Township =

Felix Township may refer to:

- Felix Township, Grundy County, Illinois
- Felix Township, Grundy County, Iowa
