= Braceville =

Braceville can refer to:

- Braceville Township, Grundy County, Illinois
- Braceville, Illinois, a village within Braceville Township
- Braceville Township, Ohio
