= Wauponsee, Illinois =

- Unincorporated community
- Location within Illinois Location within the United States
- Coordinates: 41°16′28″N 88°29′40″W
- Country: United States
- State: Illinois
- County: Grundy
- Elevation: 620 ft (190 m)
- Time zone: UTC-6 (Central (CST))
  - Summer (DST): UTC-5 (CDT)
- Area codes: 815 & 779
- GNIS feature ID: 420653

Wauponsee is an unincorporated community in Vienna Township, Grundy County, Illinois, United States. Wauponsee is located on Verona Road, 6.9 miles (11.1 km) south-southwest of Morris.
