= Silas B. Cobb =

American industrialist (1812–1900)

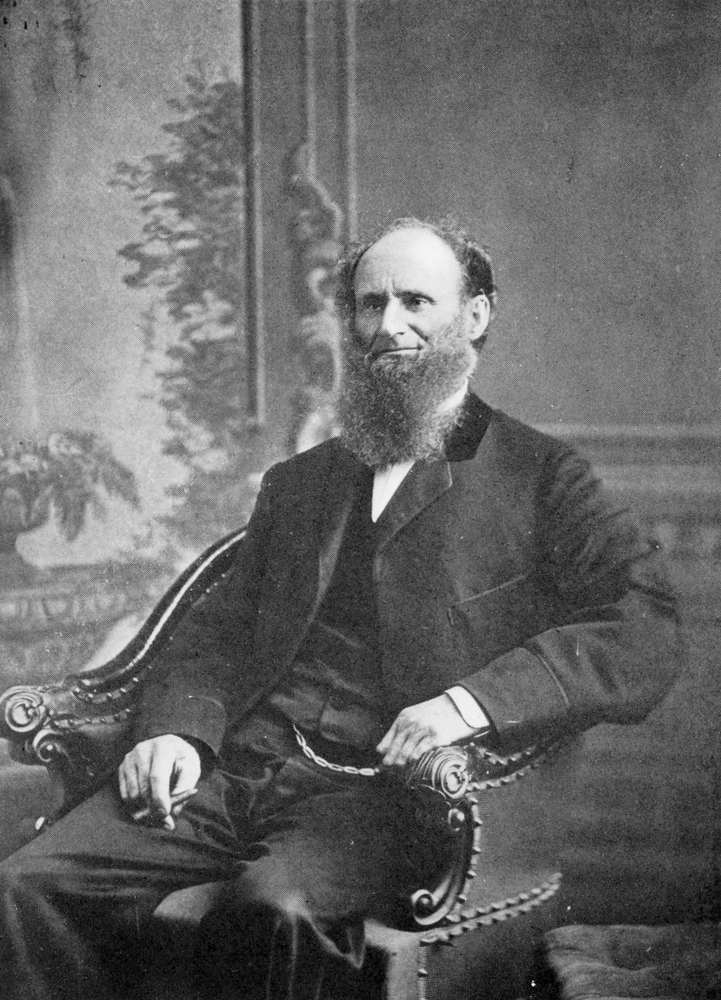
Silas B. Cobb, courtesy: University of Chicago Photographic Archive

Silas Bowman Cobb (January 23, 1812 – April 5, 1900) was an American industrialist and pioneer who made his fortune through business and real estate ventures primarily in Chicago, Illinois. Arriving in 1833, Cobb was one of Chicago's earliest settlers and later became one of its wealthiest businessmen and property owners as well as one of the city's largest benefactors. He is also noted for his principal contributions to the founding of the University of Chicago.

== Chicago pioneer ==
Cobb was born in 1812 in Montpelier, Vermont to farmer and tanner, Silas W. Cobb. His mother died when he was an infant. Due to his father's inconsistent and modest means, Cobb often had to forgo his education to support the family. It is said that this self-reliance led to his later success.

In June 1833, he moved west to Chicago with very little money and began work at the then village's first hotel. At the time of his arrival, it is said that Chicago had only 250 residents.

With his earnings, Cobb invested in stock and began to trade with local Native Americans. This provided the capital to start his first business venture, a harness shop, for which he walked 60 miles to obtain lumber that he carried back to Chicago via wagon. The business prospered and he sold it for a significant profit in 1848. He used the money to create a new boot and shoe business and flourished beyond his "fondest anticipations". With this new wealth Cobb invested early in Chicago real estate and became one of its wealthiest land owners. In 1840, Cobb married Maria Warren, daughter of fellow Chicago pioneer Daniel Warren, early founder of nearby Warrenville, Illinois (DuPage County).

Although known for his frugality and aversion to debt, Cobb was one of the original residents of Chicago's ostentatious "millionaire's row" on South Prairie Avenue with other notable Chicago residents such as department store mogul Marshall Field, railroad car manufacturer George Pullman, and his daughter and son-in-law, Mr. and Mrs. Joseph Griswold Coleman of Coleman Hardware Company.

== Public investment ==
Cobb has also been identified with semi-public enterprises. He made substantial investments in public utilities in Chicago and became a director of the Chicago Gas, Light and Coke Company. He was on the board of directors of two railroads, the Galena and Chicago Union Railroad and the Beloit and Madison Railroad, predecessors the Chicago and Northwestern Railway. Cobb was also appointed the president of the Chicago City Railway Company and was responsible for introducing cable cars to the city. He was additionally a director of the former National Bank of Illinois.

== Contributions to the University of Chicago ==
It is believed that up to the time this subscription was made, few, if any, ones had ever been made to education by a Chicago citizen at one time. A noble building, the Cobb Lecture Hall, now stands on the University campus, a monument of the builder's liberality and public spirit. - excerpted from History of Chicago by John Moses

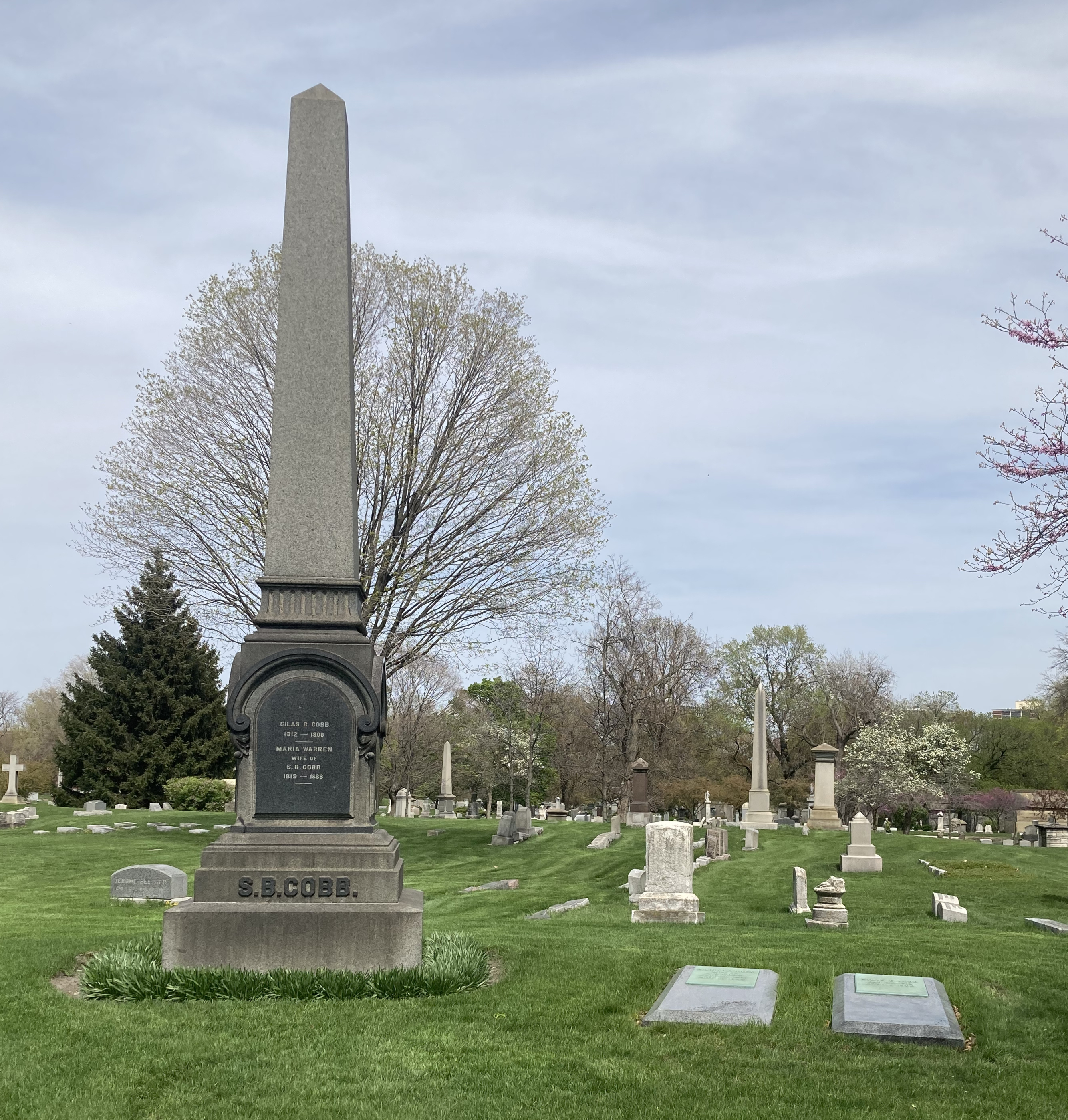
Cobb's grave at Graceland Cemetery

Cobb was the earliest benefactor of the physical construction of the University of Chicago. While the original endowment for the university was funded by a donation from oil magnate and philanthropist John D. Rockefeller, it was stipulated that such money could not be used for buildings. The university thus looked for donors who could secure Rockefeller's endowment by providing funds for the campus' physical facilities. Cobb provided the funds for the campus' first building, Cobb Lecture Hall, which included classrooms, a recitation hall, and a chapel. Constructed in 1892 at a cost of $222,000, it is the oldest and most expensive of the campus' original sixteen buildings. Members of Cobb's family were also major benefactors to the university's construction, including sister-in-law Mrs. Jerome (Mary Warren) Beecher, who funded Beecher Hall, and son-in-law George C. Walker, who funded the Walker Museum.

== Death ==
Cobb died from pneumonia at his daughter's home in Chicago on April 5, 1900. He was buried at Graceland Cemetery.
