= Morris Municipal Airport (Illinois) =

Public Airport in Morris, Illinois

Coordinates: 41°25′28″N 088°25′07″W

- IATA: none; ICAO: none; FAA LID: C09

Summary
- Airport type: Public
- Owner/Operator: City of Morris
- Location: Morris, Illinois
- Time zone: UTC−06:00 (-6)
  - Summer (DST): UTC−05:00 (-5)
- Elevation AMSL: 585 ft / 178 m
- Website: https://morrisil.org/morris-airport/
- Interactive map of Morris Municipal Airport

Runways
Direction	Length		Surface
Direction	ft	m	Surface
18/36	5,501	1,677	Asphalt

Morris Municipal Airport, also known as James R. Washburn Field, is a public use airport four miles (6.4 km) north of Morris, Illinois. The airport is publicly owned by the City of Morris.

== Facilities ==
The airport has one paved runway. Runway 18/36 is 5,501 by 75 feet (1,677 m × 23 m) and is asphalt. In 2019, the airport was awarded nearly $12 million to build a new crosswind runway to make the airport accessible in a wider array of weather conditions. The city is currently working to extend Runway 18/36 by 899 feet (274 m) to be able to accept a wider array of aircraft that need more distance to take off and land.

The airport has a fixed-base operator (FBO) offering fuel and aircraft parking. Aircraft parking, rental cars, conference rooms, a lounge, office space, and courtesy cars are also available. Aircraft maintenance, flight training, and aircraft rental are offered to local pilots.

== Aircraft ==
For the 12-month period ending February 29, 2020, the airport averaged 116 aircraft operations per day, or about 42,000 per year. This includes 97% general aviation, 2% air taxi, and less than 1% military. For the same period, there were 59 aircraft based on the field: 54 single-engine and 3 multi-engine airplanes, 1 jet, and 1 helicopter.
