= Morris Township, Grundy County, Illinois =

Morris Township
- Township
- Location in Grundy County

- Grundy County's location in Illinois
- Coordinates: 41°21′52″N 88°24′26″W
- Country: United States
- State: Illinois
- County: Grundy
- Established: November 6, 1849

Area
  - Total: 3.86 sq mi (10.0 km^{2})
  - Land: 3.48 sq mi (9.0 km^{2})
  - Water: 0.38 sq mi (0.98 km^{2}) 9.91%
- Elevation: 518 ft (158 m)

Population (2020)
  - Total: 7,139
  - Density: 2,050/sq mi (792/km^{2})
- Time zone: UTC-6 (CST)
  - Summer (DST): UTC-5 (CDT)
- ZIP code: 60450
- FIPS code: 17-063-50504

Morris Township is one of seventeen townships in Grundy County, Illinois, USA. As of the 2020 United States Census, its population was 7,139 and it contained 3,353 housing units.

== Geography ==
According to the 2021 census gazetteer files, Morris Township has a total area of 3.86 square miles (10.00 km^{2}), of which 3.48 square miles (9.01 km^{2}) (or 90.09%) is land and 0.38 square miles (0.98 km^{2}) (or 9.91%) is water.

=== Cities, towns, villages ===
- Morris (east quarter)

=== Cemeteries ===
The township contains Evergreen Cemetery.

=== Major highways ===
- Illinois Route 47

=== Airports and landing strips ===
- Morris Hospital Heliport

=== Landmarks ===
- Gebhard Woods State Park
- Goold Park
- Grundy County Courthouse & Govt Center
- William G. Stratton State Park

== Demographics ==
As of the 2020 census there were 7,139 people, 3,473 households, and 2,193 families residing in the township. The population density was 1,847.57 inhabitants per square mile (713.35/km^{2}). There were 3,353 housing units at an average density of 867.75 per square mile (335.04/km^{2}). The racial makeup of the township was 80.81% White, 1.71% African American, 0.50% Native American, 0.95% Asian, 0.01% Pacific Islander, 6.21% from other races, and 9.81% from two or more races. Hispanic or Latino of any race were 16.91% of the population.

There were 3,473 households, out of which 29.70% had children under the age of 18 living with them, 39.16% were married couples living together, 14.92% had a female householder with no spouse present, and 36.86% were non-families. 31.90% of all households were made up of individuals, and 8.80% had someone living alone who was 65 years of age or older. The average household size was 2.17 and the average family size was 2.68.

The township's age distribution consisted of 21.5% under the age of 18, 8.3% from 18 to 24, 31.9% from 25 to 44, 24.7% from 45 to 64, and 13.7% who were 65 years of age or older. The median age was 35.2 years. For every 100 females, there were 105.0 males. For every 100 females age 18 and over, there were 94.9 males.

The median income for a household in the township was $60,794, and the median income for a family was $62,300. Males had a median income of $45,808 versus $28,750 for females. The per capita income for the township was $31,411. About 6.0% of families and 8.1% of the population were below the poverty line, including 15.4% of those under age 18 and 5.5% of those age 65 or over.

Historical population
Census	Pop.	Note	%±
2000	7,709		—
2010	7,110		−7.8%
2020	7,139		0.4%
U.S. Decennial Census

== Political districts ==
- Illinois' 11th congressional district
- State House District 75
- State Senate District 38
