= Carbon Hill =

Carbon Hill is the name of three places in the United States:

- Carbon Hill, Alabama
- Carbon Hill, Illinois
- Carbon Hill, Ohio
