= Paytonville, Illinois =

- Unincorporated community
- Location within Illinois Location within the United States
- Coordinates: 41°20′12″N 88°25′52″W
- Country: United States
- State: Illinois
- County: Grundy
- Elevation: 515 ft (157 m)
- Time zone: UTC-6 (Central (CST))
  - Summer (DST): UTC-5 (CDT)
- Area codes: 815 & 779
- GNIS feature ID: 415477

Paytonville is an unincorporated community in Wauponsee Township, Grundy County, Illinois, United States. Paytonville is located along Southmoor Road near Illinois Route 47, 1.5 miles (2.4 km) south of Morris.
