= Saratoga Township, Grundy County, Illinois =

Saratoga Township
- Township
- Location in Grundy County

- Grundy County's location in Illinois
- Coordinates: 41°25′N 88°25′W
- Country: United States
- State: Illinois
- County: Grundy
- Established: November 6, 1849

Area
  - Total: 36.23 sq mi (93.8 km^{2})
  - Land: 36.00 sq mi (93.2 km^{2})
  - Water: 0.23 sq mi (0.60 km^{2}) 0.64%
- Elevation: 554 ft (169 m)

Population (2020)
  - Total: 6,342
  - Density: 176.2/sq mi (68.02/km^{2})
- Time zone: UTC-6 (CST)
  - Summer (DST): UTC-5 (CDT)
- ZIP codes: 60447, 60450
- FIPS code: 17-063-67678

Saratoga Township (T34N R7E) is one of seventeen townships in Grundy County, Illinois, USA. As of the 2020 census, its population was 6,342 and it contained 2,681 housing units.

== Geography ==
According to the 2021 census gazetteer files, Saratoga Township has a total area of 36.23 square miles (93.84 km^{2}), of which 36.00 square miles (93.24 km^{2}) (or 99.36%) is land and 0.23 square miles (0.60 km^{2}) (or 0.64%) is water.

=== Cities, towns, villages ===
- Channahon (west edge)
- Morris (north half)

=== Unincorporated towns ===
- Fields of Saratoga at 41.384°N 88.440°W
- Goode Subdivision at 41.376°N 88.388°W
- Lisbon North at 41.385°N 88.436°W
- Ridgecrest at 41.399°N 88.398°W

(This list is based on USGS data and may include former settlements.)

=== Cemeteries ===
The township contains these three cemeteries: Catholic North, Cryder and Saratoga.

=== Major highways ===
- Interstate 80
- U.S. Route 6
- Illinois Route 47

=== Airports and landing strips ===
- Morris Municipal Airport
- Nelson Airport

== Demographics ==
As of the 2020 census there were 6,342 people, 2,626 households, and 1,840 families residing in the township. The population density was 175.03 inhabitants per square mile (67.58/km^{2}). There were 2,681 housing units at an average density of 73.99 per square mile (28.57/km^{2}). The racial makeup of the township was 83.57% White, 3.00% African American, 0.11% Native American, 1.32% Asian, 0.11% Pacific Islander, 4.34% from other races, and 7.55% from two or more races. Hispanic or Latino of any race were 11.54% of the population.

There were 2,626 households, out of which 36.70% had children under the age of 18 living with them, 55.56% were married couples living together, 8.23% had a female householder with no spouse present, and 29.93% were non-families. 25.20% of all households were made up of individuals, and 14.00% had someone living alone who was 65 years of age or older. The average household size was 2.45 and the average family size was 2.91.

The township's age distribution consisted of 26.6% under the age of 18, 9.2% from 18 to 24, 21.4% from 25 to 44, 27.1% from 45 to 64, and 15.6% who were 65 years of age or older. The median age was 39.3 years. For every 100 females, there were 91.6 males. For every 100 females age 18 and over, there were 95.8 males.

The median income for a household in the township was $74,470, and the median income for a family was $105,455. Males had a median income of $55,644 versus $35,828 for females. The per capita income for the township was $36,087. About 8.8% of families and 12.3% of the population were below the poverty line, including 20.8% of those under age 18 and 10.2% of those age 65 or over.

Historical population
Census	Pop.	Note	%±
2000	4,506		—
2010	6,122		35.9%
2020	6,342		3.6%
U.S. Decennial Census

== Political districts ==
- Illinois' 11th congressional district
- State House District 75
- State Senate District 38
