= Morris Wide Water Canal Boat Site =

Archaeological site in Illinois, United States

- U.S. National Register of Historic Places
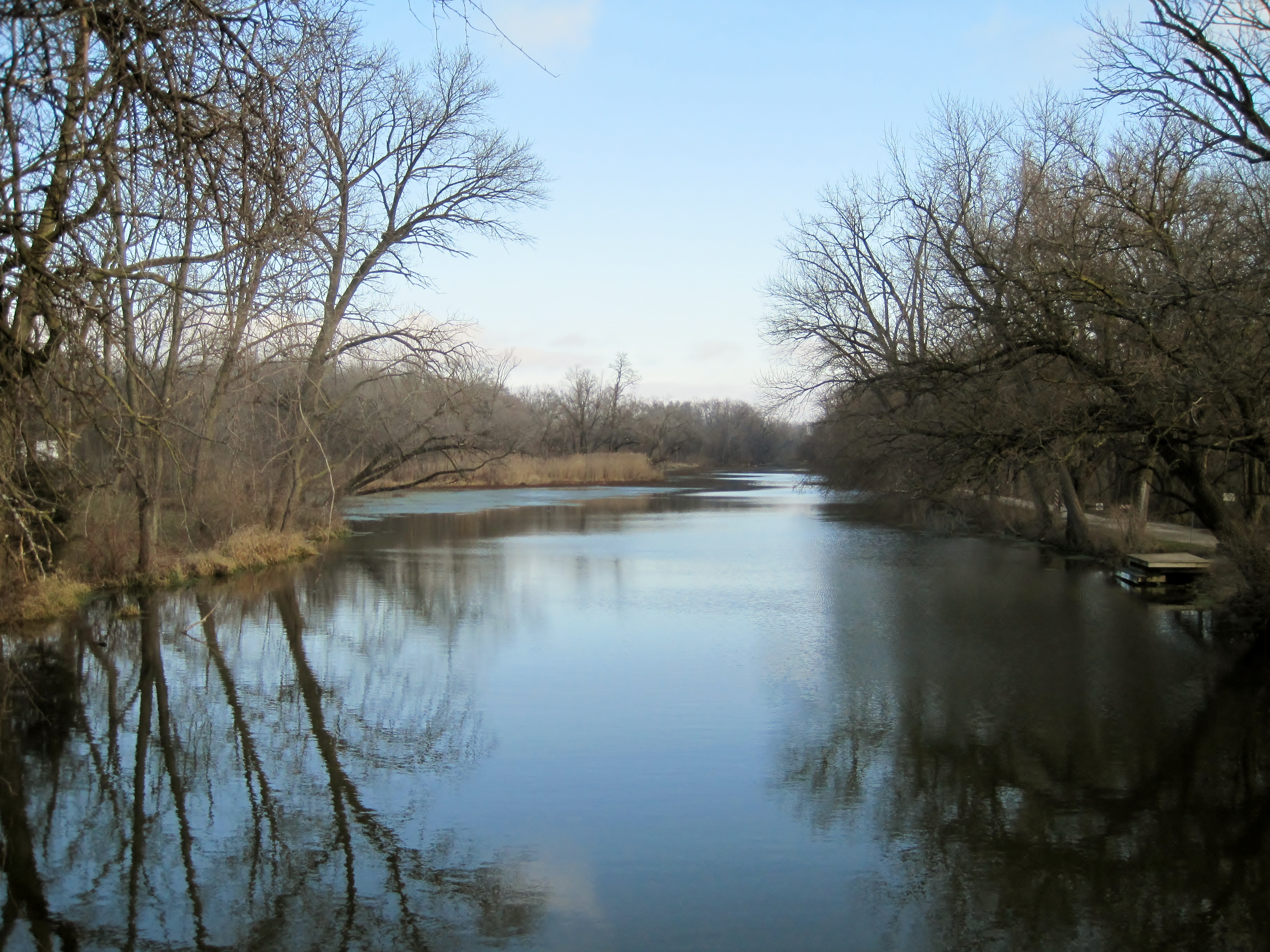

- Location within Illinois Location within the United States
- Location: East Washington St., Morris, Illinois
- Coordinates: 41°21′59″N 88°24′12″W
- Area: 2 acres (0.81 ha)
- NRHP reference No.: 99001708
- Added to NRHP: February 4, 2000

The Morris Wide Water Canal Boat Site is an archaeological site in Morris, Illinois, which contains the remains of seven canal boats sunk in the Illinois & Michigan Canal. The boats were likely built between 1865 and 1885 and were abandoned at the site between 1895 and 1915, after which they gradually sank. All of the boats were flat-bottomed with a rounded bow and stern. The hulls of the boats are in good condition and provide insight into construction methods used in canal boats of the period. As no fully intact Illinois canal boats from the period survive, the remains of these boats are some of the few pieces of physical evidence which can be used to study canal travel during the era. The remains were first discovered in 1978 after a storm exposed the part of the canal bed containing the boats; another storm in 1996 again exposed the boats and allowed further studies to be conducted on them.

The site was added to the National Register of Historic Places on February 4, 2000.
