= Erienna Township, Grundy County, Illinois =

Erienna Township
- Township
- Location in Grundy County

- Grundy County's location in Illinois
- Coordinates: 41°20′58″N 88°31′38″W
- Country: United States
- State: Illinois
- County: Grundy
- Established: November 6, 1849

Area
  - Total: 21.55 sq mi (55.8 km^{2})
  - Land: 20.82 sq mi (53.9 km^{2})
  - Water: 0.73 sq mi (1.9 km^{2}) 3.40%
- Elevation: 522 ft (159 m)

Population (2020)
  - Total: 2,408
  - Density: 115.7/sq mi (44.66/km^{2})
- Time zone: UTC-6 (CST)
  - Summer (DST): UTC-5 (CDT)
- ZIP codes: 60450, 61360
- FIPS code: 17-063-24400
- Website: eriennatownship.org

Erienna Township is one of seventeen townships in Grundy County, Illinois, USA. As of the 2020 census, its population was 2,408 and it contained 974 housing units.

== Geography ==
According to the 2021 census gazetteer files, Erienna Township has a total area of 21.55 square miles (55.81 km^{2}), of which 20.82 square miles (53.92 km^{2}) (or 96.60%) is land and 0.73 square miles (1.89 km^{2}) (or 3.40%) is water.

=== Cities, towns, villages ===
- Morris (west quarter)
- Seneca (east edge)

=== Unincorporated towns ===
- Heatherfield at 41.366699°N 88.466458°W
- Stockdale at 41.351143°N 88.492569°W

(This list is based on USGS data and may include former settlements.)

=== Cemeteries ===
The township contains Mount Carmel Cemetery.

=== Major highways ===
- U.S. Route 6

== Demographics ==
As of the 2020 census there were 2,408 people, 896 households, and 684 families residing in the township. The population density was 111.75 inhabitants per square mile (43.15/km^{2}). There were 974 housing units at an average density of 45.20 per square mile (17.45/km^{2}). The racial makeup of the township was 89.95% White, 0.58% African American, 0.66% Native American, 1.54% Asian, 0.04% Pacific Islander, 1.45% from other races, and 5.77% from two or more races. Hispanic or Latino of any race were 5.86% of the population.

There were 896 households, out of which 27.50% had children under the age of 18 living with them, 69.75% were married couples living together, 5.47% had a female householder with no spouse present, and 23.66% were non-families. 20.40% of all households were made up of individuals, and 15.20% had someone living alone who was 65 years of age or older. The average household size was 2.52 and the average family size was 2.92.

The township's age distribution consisted of 21.6% under the age of 18, 4.7% from 18 to 24, 18.8% from 25 to 44, 20.6% from 45 to 64, and 34.2% who were 65 years of age or older. The median age was 49.2 years. For every 100 females, there were 81.5 males. For every 100 females age 18 and over, there were 78.6 males.

The median income for a household in the township was $90,938, and the median income for a family was $99,907. Males had a median income of $76,895 versus $41,192 for females. The per capita income for the township was $39,036. About 2.0% of families and 7.2% of the population were below the poverty line, including 5.2% of those under age 18 and 14.6% of those age 65 or over.

Historical population
Census	Pop.	Note	%±
2000	1,417		—
2010	2,217		56.5%
2020	2,408		8.6%
U.S. Decennial Census

== Political districts ==
- Illinois' 11th congressional district
- State House District 75
- State Senate District 38
