= Garfield Township, Grundy County, Illinois =

Garfield Township
- Township
- Location in Grundy County

- Grundy County's location in Illinois
- Coordinates: 41°09′47″N 88°19′46″W
- Country: United States
- State: Illinois
- County: Grundy
- Established: March 10, 1903

Area
  - Total: 18.16 sq mi (47.0 km^{2})
  - Land: 18.11 sq mi (46.9 km^{2})
  - Water: 0.04 sq mi (0.10 km^{2}) 0.24%
- Elevation: 594 ft (181 m)

Population (2020)
  - Total: 1,454
  - Density: 80.29/sq mi (31.00/km^{2})
- Time zone: UTC-6 (CST)
  - Summer (DST): UTC-5 (CDT)
- ZIP code: 60424
- FIPS code: 17-063-28677

Garfield Township is one of seventeen townships in Grundy County, Illinois, USA. As of the 2020 census, its population was 1,454 and it contained 659 housing units.

== History ==
Garfield township was formed from Greenfield township on March 10, 1903. The area contained coal mines.

== Geography ==
According to the 2021 census gazetteer files, Garfield Township has a total area of 18.16 square miles (47.03 km^{2}), of which 18.11 square miles (46.90 km^{2}) (or 99.76%) is land and 0.04 square miles (0.10 km^{2}) (or 0.24%) is water.

=== Cities, towns, villages ===
- Gardner (vast majority)

=== Cemeteries ===
The township contains Grand Prairie Lutheran Cemetery.

=== Major highways ===
- Interstate 55
- Illinois Route 53

== Demographics ==
As of the 2020 census there were 1,454 people, 608 households, and 443 families residing in the township. The population density was 80.08 inhabitants per square mile (30.92/km^{2}). There were 659 housing units at an average density of 36.30 per square mile (14.02/km^{2}). The racial makeup of the township was 91.88% White, 0.48% African American, 0.55% Native American, 0.55% Asian, 0.00% Pacific Islander, 1.72% from other races, and 4.81% from two or more races. Hispanic or Latino of any race were 6.53% of the population.

There were 608 households, out of which 24.30% had children under the age of 18 living with them, 65.95% were married couples living together, 5.10% had a female householder with no spouse present, and 27.14% were non-families. 20.70% of all households were made up of individuals, and 6.40% had someone living alone who was 65 years of age or older. The average household size was 2.50 and the average family size was 2.94.

The township's age distribution consisted of 15.8% under the age of 18, 12.0% from 18 to 24, 27% from 25 to 44, 29.7% from 45 to 64, and 15.6% who were 65 years of age or older. The median age was 43.4 years. For every 100 females, there were 113.0 males. For every 100 females age 18 and over, there were 119.6 males.

The median income for a household in the township was $67,159, and the median income for a family was $70,893. Males had a median income of $56,591 versus $40,410 for females. The per capita income for the township was $35,365. About 4.7% of families and 5.8% of the population were below the poverty line, including 8.3% of those under age 18 and 7.6% of those age 65 or over.

Historical population
| Census | Pop. | Note | %± |
|---|---|---|---|
| 2000 | 1,533 | | — |
| 2010 | 1,586 | | 3.5% |
| 2020 | 1,454 | | −8.3% |
U.S. Decennial Census

== School districts ==
- Herscher Community Unit School District 2

== Political districts ==
- Illinois' 11th congressional district
- State House District 75
- State Senate District 38
