= Morris Downtown Commercial Historic District =

Historic district in Illinois, United States

- U.S. National Register of Historic Places
- U.S. Historic district
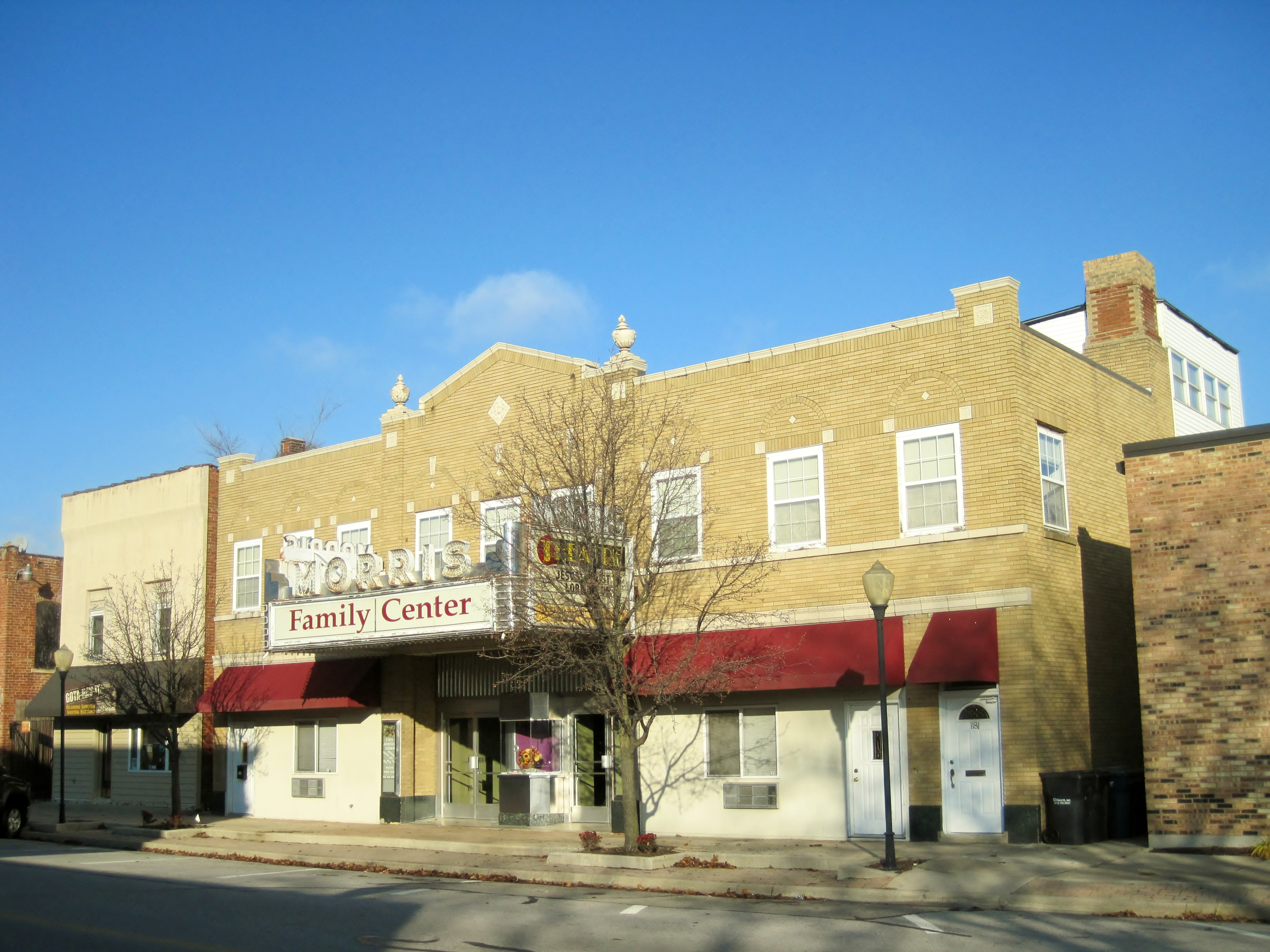

- Location within Illinois Location within the United States
- Location: Liberty St., roughly bounded by the RR, Illinois St., Fulton and Wauponsee Sts and Franklin, Morris, Illinois
- Coordinates: 41.35919°N 88.42381°W
- Area: 24 acres (9.7 ha)
- Built: 1911
- NRHP reference No.: 05001603
- Added to NRHP: January 31, 2006

The Morris Downtown Commercial Historic District is a historic district in downtown Morris. The district includes 116 buildings and a monument; 105 of these are commercial buildings, and 87 are contributing properties to the district.

== History ==
The historic district reflects the history of Morris, Illinois, as a canal town on the Illinois & Michigan Canal. Named after canal commissioner Isaac N. Morris, the town became the Grundy County seat in 1841 and was originally platted a year later. The earliest of the buildings were built in the 1850s, shortly after the canal's construction. Then, the Chicago, Rock Island & Pacific Railroad were completed in 1848 and 1853, respectively. Morris became an important transportation hub. Commercial development began north of the canal along Illinois (originally Canal) and Washington Streets which was home to livery, blacksmith, and harness businesses. Lyman Ray, future Lieutenant Governor of Illinois, opened the town's first dry goods store.

The district was added to the National Register of Historic Places on January 31, 2006.

== Architecture ==
The district mainly consists of brick or sandstone commercial buildings of uniform size, and its character is considered typical of a small town business district. The buildings in the district were designed in a wide variety of architectural styles, including Commercial, Italianate, Queen Anne, Classical Revival, Renaissance Revival, and Tudor Revival. The district also contains two prominent government buildings, the Grundy County Courthouse and the Morris Post Office. There is also an interurban railway station.
