= Robert C. Underwood =

American jurist (1915–1988)

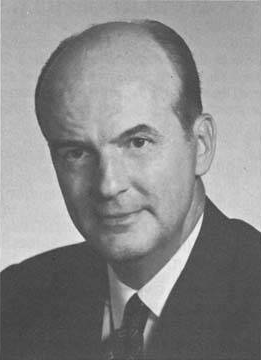
Underwood's official photograph, c. 1973.

Robert Charles Underwood (October 27, 1915 – March 30, 1988) was an American jurist.

Born in Gardner, Illinois, Underwood received his bachelor's degree from Illinois Wesleyan University in 1937 and his bachelor's degree from University of Illinois College of Law in 1939. Underwood practiced law in Normal, Illinois. Underwood served as Normal City Attorney and as circuit court judge for McLean County, Illinois. He also served as an assistant state's attorney for McLean County. Underwood was a Republican. Underwood served on the Illinois Supreme Court from 1962 until his retirement in 1984. He served as chief justice from 1969 until 1976, longer than any other jurist. Underwood died of a heart attack at his home in Normal, Illinois.
