= Goodfarm Township, Grundy County, Illinois =

Goodfarm Township
- Township
- Location in Grundy County

- Grundy County's location in Illinois
- Coordinates: 41°09′12″N 88°24′49″W
- Country: United States
- State: Illinois
- County: Grundy
- Established: November 6, 1849

Area
  - Total: 35.76 sq mi (92.6 km^{2})
  - Land: 35.62 sq mi (92.3 km^{2})
  - Water: 0.14 sq mi (0.36 km^{2}) 0.39%
- Elevation: 610 ft (186 m)

Population (2020)
  - Total: 353
  - Density: 9.91/sq mi (3.83/km^{2})
- Time zone: UTC-6 (CST)
  - Summer (DST): UTC-5 (CDT)
- ZIP codes: 60420, 60424, 60444
- FIPS code: 17-063-30432

Goodfarm Township is one of seventeen townships in Grundy County, Illinois, United States. As of the 2020 census, its population was 353 and it contained 138 housing units.

== Geography ==
According to the 2021 census gazetteer files, Goodfarm Township has a total area of 35.76 square miles (92.62 km^{2}), of which 35.62 square miles (92.26 km^{2}) (or 99.61%) is land and 0.14 square miles (0.36 km^{2}) (or 0.39%) is water.

=== Cities, towns, villages ===
- Dwight (north quarter)

=== Cemeteries ===
The township contains Goodfarm Cemetery.

=== Major highways ===
- Interstate 55
- Illinois Route 47

=== Airports and landing strips ===
- Dwight Airport

== Demographics ==
As of the 2020 census, there were 353 people, 99 households, and 62 families residing in the township. The population density was 9.87 inhabitants per square mile (3.81/km^{2}). There were 138 housing units at an average density of 3.86 per square mile (1.49/km^{2}). The racial makeup of the township was 88.39% White, 0.57% African American, 0.00% Native American, 3.40% Asian, 0.00% Pacific Islander, 2.27% from other races, and 5.38% from two or more races. Hispanic or Latino of any race were 7.65% of the population.

There were 99 households, out of which 17.20% had children under the age of 18 living with them, 52.53% were married couples living together, 10.10% had a female householder with no spouse present, and 37.37% were non-families. 16.20% of all households were made up of individuals, and 16.20% had someone living alone who was 65 years of age or older. The average household size was 2.59 and the average family size was 3.18.

The township's age distribution consisted of 17.2% under the age of 18, 8.2% from 18 to 24, 29.3% from 25 to 44, 32.4% from 45 to 64, and 12.9% who were 65 years of age or older. The median age was 40.3 years. For every 100 females, there were 77.8 males. For every 100 females age 18 and over, there were 81.2 males.

The median income for a family was $91,389. Males had a median income of $74,773 versus $28,625 for females. The per capita income for the township was $30,721. None of the population was below the poverty line.

Historical population
Census	Pop.	Note	%±
2000	401		—
2010	376		−6.2%
2020	353		−6.1%
U.S. Decennial Census

== Political districts ==
- Illinois' 11th congressional district (from 2003 to 2013)
- State House District 75
- State Senate District 38
