= Nettle Creek, Illinois =

- Unincorporated community
- Location within Illinois Location within the United States
- Coordinates: 41°26′33″N 88°34′41″W
- Country: United States
- State: Illinois
- County: Grundy
- Elevation: 676 ft (206 m)
- Time zone: UTC-6 (Central (CST))
  - Summer (DST): UTC-5 (CDT)
- Area codes: 815 & 779
- GNIS feature ID: 423014

Nettle Creek (also Nettlecreek) is an unincorporated community in Nettle Creek Township, Grundy County, Illinois, United States.
