= Nettle Creek Township, Grundy County, Illinois =

Nettle Creek Township
- Township
- Location in Grundy County

- Grundy County's location in Illinois
- Coordinates: 41°25′N 88°33′W
- Country: United States
- State: Illinois
- County: Grundy
- Established: November 6, 1849

Area
  - Total: 35.82 sq mi (92.8 km^{2})
  - Land: 35.79 sq mi (92.7 km^{2})
  - Water: 0.03 sq mi (0.078 km^{2}) 0.09%
- Elevation: 610 ft (186 m)

Population (2020)
  - Total: 501
  - Density: 14.0/sq mi (5.40/km^{2})
- Time zone: UTC-6 (CST)
  - Summer (DST): UTC-5 (CDT)
- ZIP codes: 60450, 60541, 61360
- FIPS code: 17-063-52038

Nettle Creek Township (T34N R6E) is one of seventeen townships in Grundy County, Illinois, USA. As of the 2020 census, its population was 501 and it contained 193 housing units.

== Geography ==
According to the 2021 census gazetteer files, Nettle Creek Township has a total area of 35.82 square miles (92.77 km^{2}), of which 35.79 square miles (92.70 km^{2}) (or 99.91%) is land and 0.03 square miles (0.08 km^{2}) (or 0.09%) is water.

=== Unincorporated towns ===
- Nettle Creek at 41.253°N 88.578°W

(This list is based on USGS data and may include former settlements.)

=== Cemeteries ===
The township contains Holderman and Hoge Cemetery.

=== Major highways ===
- Interstate 80
- U.S. Route 6

== Demographics ==
As of the 2020 census there were 501 people, 217 households, and 177 families residing in the township. The population density was 13.99 inhabitants per square mile (5.40/km^{2}). There were 193 housing units at an average density of 5.39 per square mile (2.08/km^{2}). The racial makeup of the township was 87.43% White, 0.20% African American, 0.00% Native American, 2.00% Asian, 0.00% Pacific Islander, 2.59% from other races, and 7.78% from two or more races. Hispanic or Latino of any race were 7.39% of the population.

There were 217 households, out of which 48.40% had children under the age of 18 living with them, 75.12% were married couples living together, 6.45% had a female householder with no spouse present, and 18.43% were non-families. 14.70% of all households were made up of individuals, and 6.00% had someone living alone who was 65 years of age or older. The average household size was 3.02 and the average family size was 3.36.

The township's age distribution consisted of 32.8% under the age of 18, 5.6% from 18 to 24, 20.6% from 25 to 44, 33% from 45 to 64, and 8.1% who were 65 years of age or older. The median age was 38.2 years. For every 100 females, there were 105.0 males. For every 100 females age 18 and over, there were 121.6 males.

The median income for a household in the township was $112,708, and the median income for a family was $115,393. Males had a median income of $73,125 versus $34,625 for females. The per capita income for the township was $38,791. No families and 1.8% of the population were below the poverty line, including 2.3% of those under age 18 and none of those age 65 or over.

Historical population
| Census | Pop. | Note | %± |
|---|---|---|---|
| 2000 | 489 | | — |
| 2010 | 503 | | 2.9% |
| 2020 | 501 | | −0.4% |
U.S. Decennial Census

== Political districts ==
- Illinois' 11th congressional district
- State House District 75
- State Senate District 38
