= Braceville Township, Grundy County, Illinois =

Braceville Township
- Township
- Location in Grundy County

- Grundy County's location in Illinois
- Coordinates: 41°14′43″N 88°16′35″W
- Country: United States
- State: Illinois
- County: Grundy
- Established: November 6, 1849

Area
  - Total: 18.07 sq mi (46.8 km^{2})
  - Land: 17.87 sq mi (46.3 km^{2})
  - Water: 0.20 sq mi (0.52 km^{2}) 1.11%
- Elevation: 571 ft (174 m)

Population (2020)
  - Total: 6,463
  - Density: 361.7/sq mi (139.6/km^{2})
- Time zone: UTC-6 (CST)
  - Summer (DST): UTC-5 (CDT)
- ZIP codes: 60407, 60416, 60424
- FIPS code: 17-063-07653

Braceville Township is one of seventeen townships in Grundy County, Illinois, USA. As of the 2010 census, its population was 6,463 and it contained 2,617 housing units.

== Geography ==
According to the 2021 census gazetteer files, Braceville Township has a total area of 18.07 square miles (46.80 km^{2}), of which 17.87 square miles (46.28 km^{2}) (or 98.89%) is land and 0.20 square miles (0.52 km^{2}) (or 1.11%) is water.

=== Cities, towns, villages ===
- Braceville
- Coal City (south three-quarters)
- Diamond (south quarter)
- Godley (west half)

=== Unincorporated towns ===
- Central City at 41.23781°N 88.281729°W
- Mazonia at 41.209199°N 88.281172°W

(This list is based on USGS data and may include former settlements.)

=== Extinct towns ===
- Centerville at 41.256421°N 88.293952°W

(These towns are listed as "historical" by the USGS.)

=== Cemeteries ===
The township contains Cotton Cemetery.

=== Major highways ===
- Interstate 55
- Illinois Route 53

== Demographics ==
As of the 2020 census there were 6,463 people, 2,386 households, and 1,657 families residing in the township. The population density was 357.59 inhabitants per square mile (138.07/km^{2}). There were 2,617 housing units at an average density of 144.79 per square mile (55.90/km^{2}). The racial makeup of the township was 91.06% White, 0.59% African American, 0.29% Native American, 0.31% Asian, 0.00% Pacific Islander, 1.18% from other races, and 6.58% from two or more races. Hispanic or Latino of any race were 6.00% of the population.

There were 2,386 households, out of which 40.20% had children under the age of 18 living with them, 51.01% were married couples living together, 10.94% had a female householder with no spouse present, and 30.55% were non-families. 25.20% of all households were made up of individuals, and 11.60% had someone living alone who was 65 years of age or older. The average household size was 2.62 and the average family size was 3.05.

The township's age distribution consisted of 28.0% under the age of 18, 6.7% from 18 to 24, 29.6% from 25 to 44, 26.3% from 45 to 64, and 9.3% who were 65 years of age or older. The median age was 36.7 years. For every 100 females, there were 121.4 males. For every 100 females age 18 and over, there were 103.4 males.

The median income for a household in the township was $78,542, and the median income for a family was $96,941. Males had a median income of $66,844 versus $38,472 for females. The per capita income for the township was $35,883. About 4.1% of families and 6.3% of the population were below the poverty line, including 6.2% of those under age 18 and 8.0% of those age 65 or over.

Historical population
Census	Pop.	Note	%±
2000	4,914		—
2010	6,467		31.6%
2020	6,463		−0.1%
U.S. Decennial Census

== School districts ==
- Coal City Community Unit School District 1

== Political districts ==
- Illinois' 11th congressional district
- State House District 75
- State Senate District 38
