= Coleman Hardware Company Building =

- U.S. National Register of Historic Places
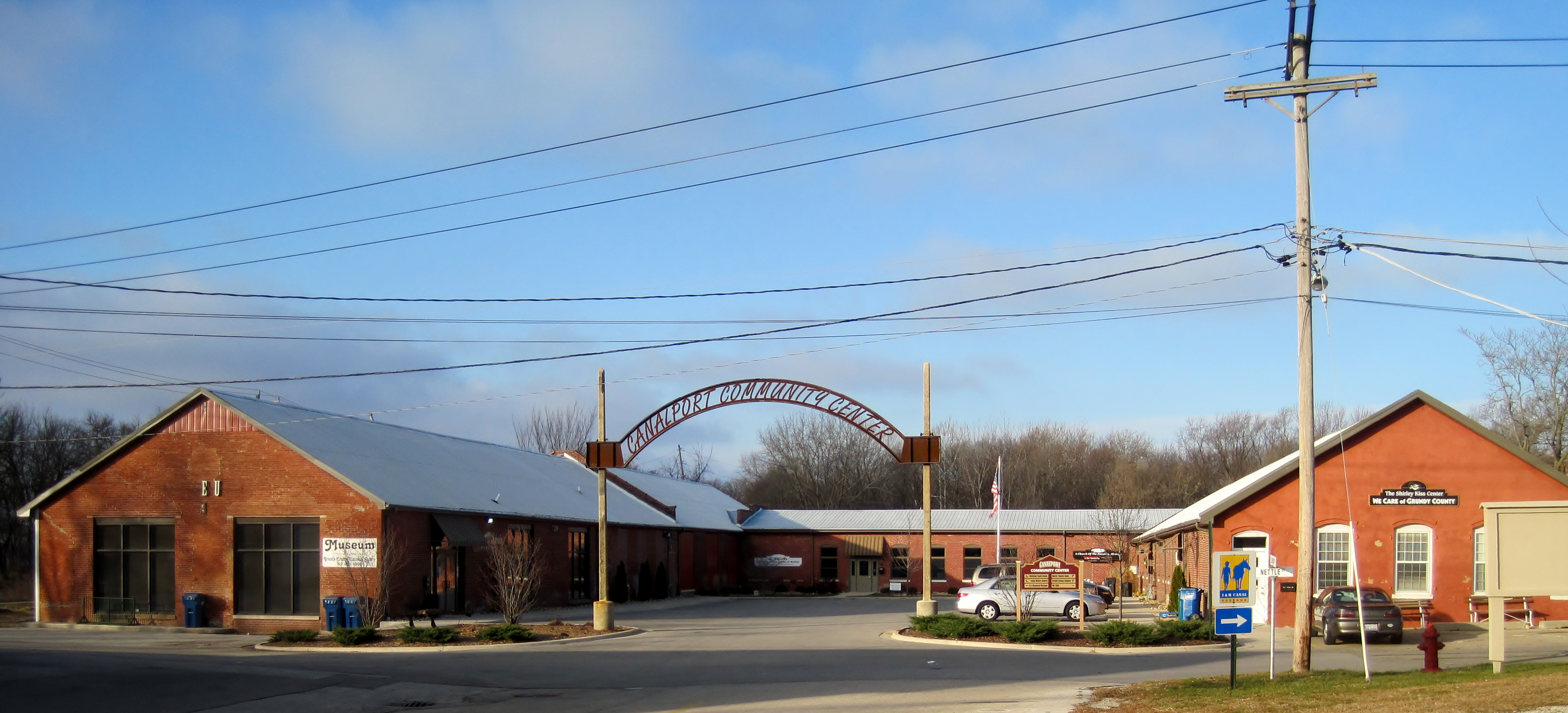

- Location within Illinois Location within the United States
- Location: 100 Nettle St., Morris, Illinois
- Coordinates: 41°21′24″N 88°25′45″W
- Area: 1.6 acres (0.65 ha)
- Architectural style: Late Victorian
- NRHP reference No.: 94000980
- Added to NRHP: August 16, 1994

The Coleman Hardware Company Building is a historic building located at 100 Nettle St. in Morris, Illinois.

== History ==
The U-shaped building has three distinct wings surrounding a gravel courtyard. Mr. J. H. Hall constructed the building in 1873, intending to use it as a furniture factory, but his company went bankrupt before he could begin production. The Sherwood School Furniture Company moved into the building soon afterward and made extensive improvements to the structure in 1874. The company added a new foundry building, put an addition on the original building, and built a new smokestack. The Sherwood Company brought economic prosperity to Morris by employing 140 new workers and purchasing resources from other local industries. The building's location on the Illinois & Michigan Canal helped the company grow, as it used the canal to transport goods and as a water source.

In 1876, the company built a new structure to replace a building lost to a fire; this structure is now the building's south wing. The company changed its name to the Ohio Butt Company in 1880 and then changed it again to the Coleman Hardware Company in 1887, after president Joseph G. Coleman.

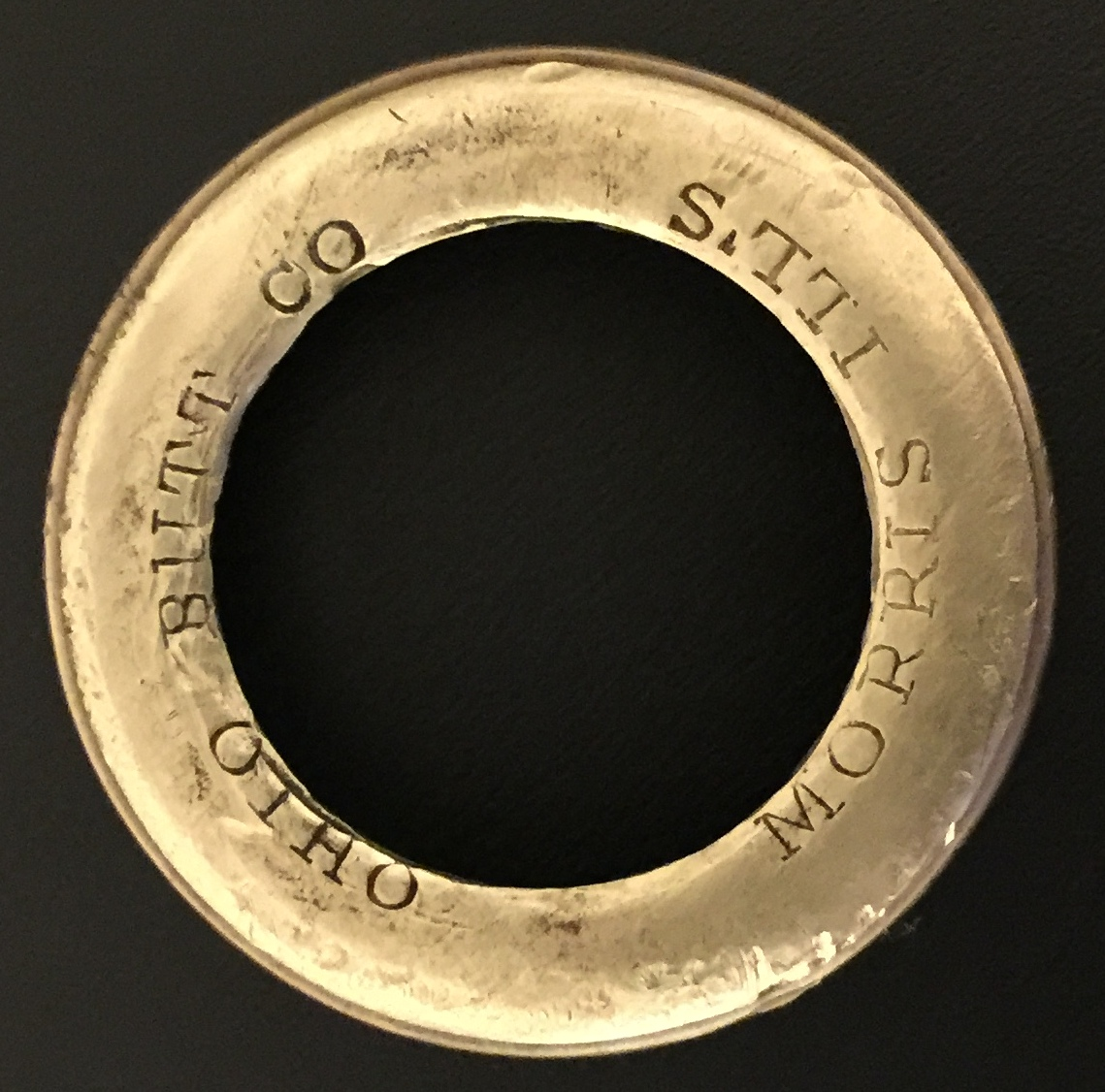
Caster Ring

During this time, the company changed its production from furniture to cast iron fixtures and other hardware. The company was sold in 1935, and the factory was sold along with it; it has since been used by various industrial companies and is now a community center.

The building was added to the National Register of Historic Places on August 16, 1994.
