= East Brooklyn, Illinois =

East Brooklyn
- Village
- Location of East Brooklyn in Grundy County, Illinois.
- Coordinates: 41°10′22″N 88°15′58″W
- Country: United States
- State: Illinois
- County: Grundy

Area
  - Total: 0.050 sq mi (0.13 km^{2})
  - Land: 0.050 sq mi (0.13 km^{2})
  - Water: 0 sq mi (0.00 km^{2})
- Elevation: 584 ft (178 m)

Population (2020)
  - Total: 80
  - Density: 1,553/sq mi (599.6/km^{2})
- Time zone: UTC-6 (CST)
  - Summer (DST): UTC-5 (CDT)
- ZIP code: 60474
- Area codes: 815 & 779
- FIPS code: 17-21579
- GNIS ID: 2398770

East Brooklyn is a village in Grundy County, Illinois, United States. The population was 80 at the 2020 census.

== Geography ==
According to the 2021 census gazetteer files, East Brooklyn has a total area of 0.05 square miles (0.13 km^{2}), all land.

== Demographics ==
Historical population
Census	Pop.	Note	%±
1910	446		—
1920	204		−54.3%
1930	79		−61.3%
1940	68		−13.9%
1950	65		−4.4%
1960	68		4.6%
1970	72		5.9%
1980	84		16.7%
1990	80		−4.8%
2000	123		53.8%
2010	106		−13.8%
2020	80		−24.5%
U.S. Decennial Census

As of the 2020 census there were 80 people, 32 households, and 14 families residing in the village. The population density was 1,538.46 inhabitants per square mile (594.00/km^{2}). There were 42 housing units at an average density of 807.69 per square mile (311.85/km^{2}). The racial makeup of the village was 93.75% White, 1.25% African American, 0.00% Native American, 0.00% Asian, 0.00% Pacific Islander, 0.00% from other races, and 5.00% from two or more races. Hispanic or Latino of any race were 2.50% of the population.

There were 32 households, out of which none had children under the age of 18 living with them, 43.75% were married couples living together, none had a female householder with no husband present, and 56.25% were non-families. 40.63% of all households were made up of individuals, and 28.13% had someone living alone who was 65 years of age or older. The average household size was 2.43 and the average family size was 1.78.

The village's age distribution consisted of 0.0% under the age of 18, 7.0% from 18 to 24, 24.6% from 25 to 44, 42.1% from 45 to 64, and 26.3% who were 65 years of age or older. The median age was 57.2 years. For every 100 females, there were 83.9 males. For every 100 females age 18 and over, there were 83.9 males.

The median income for a household in the village was $91,250, and the median income for a family was $98,500. Males had a median income of $62,917 versus $16,875 for females. The per capita income for the village was $41,647.None of the population was below the poverty line.

== Education ==
It is in the South Wilmington Consolidated School District 74 and the Gardner-South Wilmington Township High School District.
