= Verona, Illinois =

Verona
- Village
- Location of Verona in Grundy County, Illinois.
- Coordinates: 41°12′56″N 88°30′09″W
- Country: United States
- State: Illinois
- County: Grundy

Government
  - Mayor: Dennis Finch

Area
  - Total: 0.17 sq mi (0.43 km^{2})
  - Land: 0.17 sq mi (0.43 km^{2})
  - Water: 0 sq mi (0.00 km^{2})
- Elevation: 630 ft (190 m)

Population (2020)
  - Total: 208
  - Density: 1,257.0/sq mi (485.32/km^{2})
- Time zone: UTC-6 (CST)
  - Summer (DST): UTC-5 (CDT)
- ZIP code: 60479
- Area codes: 815 & 779
- FIPS code: 17-77707
- GNIS feature ID: 2400065

Verona is a village in Grundy County, Illinois. The population was 208 at the 2020 census.

The community was established circa 1876 by George D. Smith as a station on the Chicago, Pekin and Southwestern Railroad. Smith named the town for his birthplace Verona, New York.

== Geography ==
According to the 2021 census gazetteer files, Verona has a total area of 0.17 square miles (0.44 km^{2}), all land.

== Demographics ==
Historical population
Census	Pop.	Note	%±
1880	163		—
1890	212		30.1%
1910	188		—
1920	184		−2.1%
1930	279		51.6%
1940	211		−24.4%
1950	205		−2.8%
1960	192		−6.3%
1970	220		14.6%
1980	251		14.1%
1990	242		−3.6%
2000	257		6.2%
2010	215		−16.3%
2020	208		−3.3%
U.S. Decennial Census

As of the 2020 census there were 208 people, 119 households, and 60 families residing in the village. The population density was 1,260.61 inhabitants per square mile (486.72/km^{2}). There were 90 housing units at an average density of 545.45 per square mile (210.60/km^{2}). The racial makeup of the village was 80.29% White, 0.00% African American, 0.96% Native American, 3.85% Asian, 0.00% Pacific Islander, 7.21% from other races, and 7.69% from two or more races. Hispanic or Latino of any race were 16.35% of the population.

There were 119 households, out of which 27.7% had children under the age of 18 living with them, 37.82% were married couples living together, 9.24% had a female householder with no husband present, and 49.58% were non-families. 47.06% of all households were made up of individuals, and 14.29% had someone living alone who was 65 years of age or older. The average household size was 3.28 and the average family size was 2.18.

The village's age distribution consisted of 25.9% under the age of 18, 9.7% from 18 to 24, 27% from 25 to 44, 25.2% from 45 to 64, and 12.4% who were 65 years of age or older. The median age was 35.3 years. For every 100 females, there were 127.2 males. For every 100 females age 18 and over, there were 131.3 males.

The median income for a household in the village was $42,188, and the median income for a family was $68,333. Males had a median income of $33,750 versus $25,938 for females. The per capita income for the village was $26,351. About 20.0% of families and 21.2% of the population were below the poverty line, including 50.7% of those under age 18 and 6.3% of those age 65 or over.

== Education ==
It is in the Mazon-Verona-Kinsman Elementary School District 2C and the Seneca Township High School District 160.
