= Kinsman, Illinois =

Kinsman
- Village
- Location of Kinsman in Grundy County, Illinois.
- Coordinates: 41°11′25″N 88°34′12″W
- Country: United States
- State: Illinois
- County: Grundy

Area
  - Total: 0.069 sq mi (0.18 km^{2})
  - Land: 0.069 sq mi (0.18 km^{2})
  - Water: 0 sq mi (0.00 km^{2})
- Elevation: 659 ft (201 m)

Population (2020)
  - Total: 90
  - Density: 1,327/sq mi (512.3/km^{2})
- Time zone: UTC-6 (CST)
  - Summer (DST): UTC-5 (CDT)
- ZIP code: 60437
- Area code: 815
- FIPS code: 17-40143
- GNIS feature ID: 2398356

Kinsman is a village in Grundy County, Illinois, United States. The population was 90 at the 2020 census.

== Geography ==
According to the 2021 census gazetteer files, Kinsman has a total area of 0.07 square miles (0.18 km^{2}), all land.

== Demographics ==
Historical population
Census	Pop.	Note	%±
1890	129		—
1900	174		34.9%
1910	219		25.9%
1920	167		−23.7%
1930	150		−10.2%
1940	164		9.3%
1950	147		−10.4%
1960	134		−8.8%
1970	153		14.2%
1980	153		0.0%
1990	112		−26.8%
2000	109		−2.7%
2010	99		−9.2%
2020	90		−9.1%
U.S. Decennial Census

As of the 2020 census there were 90 people, 31 households, and 27 families residing in the village. The population density was 1,323.53 inhabitants per square mile (511.02/km^{2}). There were 45 housing units at an average density of 661.76 per square mile (255.51/km^{2}). The racial makeup of the village was 94.44% White, 1.11% African American, 0.00% Native American, 0.00% Asian, 0.00% Pacific Islander, 1.11% from other races, and 3.33% from two or more races. Hispanic or Latino of any race were 4.44% of the population.

There were 31 households, out of which 45.2% had children under the age of 18 living with them, 83.87% were married couples living together, 3.23% had a female householder with no husband present, and 12.90% were non-families. 12.90% of all households were made up of individuals, and 3.23% had someone living alone who was 65 years of age or older. The average household size was 3.41 and the average family size was 3.10.

The village's age distribution consisted of 18.8% under the age of 18, 19.8% from 18 to 24, 40.7% from 25 to 44, 16.6% from 45 to 64, and 4.2% who were 65 years of age or older. The median age was 29.5 years. For every 100 females, there were 84.6 males. For every 100 females age 18 and over, there were 73.3 males.

The median income for a household in the village was $81,875, and the median income for a family was $97,750. Males had a median income of $42,083 versus $16,000 for females. The per capita income for the village was $34,721. About 3.7% of families and 2.1% of the population were below the poverty line, including none of those under age 18 and none of those age 65 or over.

== 2009 FBI Raid ==
In October 2009, the Federal Bureau of Investigation, along with immigration officials and the state police, conducted a raid on an Islamic slaughterhouse in Kinsman. The town mayor, county sheriff, and local residents were very surprised by this action. After the raid, authorities revealed that two individuals associated with the slaughterhouse were charged with terrorism-related offenses.

== Education ==
It is in the Mazon-Verona-Kinsman Elementary School District 2C and the Seneca Township High School District 160.
