= Godley, Illinois =

Godley
- Village
- Location of Godley in Will County, Illinois.
- Coordinates: 41°14′17″N 88°14′54″W
- Country: United States
- State: Illinois
- Counties: Grundy, Will

Area
  - Total: 1.08 sq mi (2.81 km^{2})
  - Land: 1.08 sq mi (2.81 km^{2})
  - Water: 0 sq mi (0.00 km^{2})
- Elevation: 584 ft (178 m)

Population (2020)
  - Total: 566
  - Density: 522.5/sq mi (201.74/km^{2})
- Time zone: UTC-6 (CST)
  - Summer (DST): UTC-5 (CDT)
- ZIP code: 60407
- Area codes: 815 & 779
- FIPS code: 17-30120
- GNIS feature ID: 2398985

Godley is a village in Grundy and Will counties, Illinois, United States. The population was 566 at the 2020 census.

== Geography ==
According to the 2021 census gazetteer files, Godley has a total area of 1.08 square miles (2.80 km^{2}), of which 1.08 square miles (2.80 km^{2}) (or 99.91%) is land and 0.00 square miles (0.00 km^{2}) (or 0.09%) is water.

== Demographics ==
Historical population
Census	Pop.	Note	%±
1890	296		—
1900	329		11.1%
1910	194		−41.0%
1920	83		−57.2%
1930	60		−27.7%
1940	85		41.7%
1950	102		20.0%
1960	97		−4.9%
1970	242		149.5%
1980	373		54.1%
1990	322		−13.7%
2000	594		84.5%
2010	601		1.2%
2020	566		−5.8%
U.S. Decennial Census

=== 2020 census ===
Godley village, Illinois – Racial and ethnic composition Note: the US Census treats Hispanic/Latino as an ethnic category. This table excludes Latinos from the racial categories and assigns them to a separate category. Hispanics/Latinos may be of any race.
Race / Ethnicity (NH = Non-Hispanic)	Pop 2000	Pop 2010	Pop 2020	% 2000	% 2010	% 2020
White alone (NH)	555	549	509	93.43%	91.35%	89.93%
Black or African American alone (NH)	1	5	5	0.17%	0.83%	0.88%
Native American or Alaska Native alone (NH)	0	3	3	0.00%	0.50%	0.53%
Asian alone (NH)	0	0	1	0.00%	0.00%	0.18%
Native Hawaiian or Pacific Islander alone (NH)	0	0	0	0.00%	0.00%	0.00%
Other race alone (NH)	0	1	0	0.00%	0.17%	0.00%
Mixed race or Multiracial (NH)	2	19	22	0.34%	3.16%	3.89%
Hispanic or Latino (any race)	36	24	26	6.06%	3.99%	4.59%
Total	594	601	566	100.00%	100.00%	100.00%

As of the 2020 census there were 566 people, 281 households, and 189 families residing in the village. The population density was 522.14 inhabitants per square mile (201.60/km^{2}). There were 239 housing units at an average density of 220.48 per square mile (85.13/km^{2}). The racial makeup of the village was 91.17% White, 0.88% African American, 0.53% Native American, 0.18% Asian, 0.00% Pacific Islander, 2.12% from other races, and 5.12% from two or more races. Hispanic or Latino of any race were 4.59% of the population.

There were 281 households, out of which 28.8% had children under the age of 18 living with them, 41.64% were married couples living together, 21.71% had a female householder with no husband present, and 32.74% were non-families. 26.33% of all households were made up of individuals, and 10.68% had someone living alone who was 65 years of age or older. The average household size was 2.94 and the average family size was 2.46.

The village's age distribution consisted of 17.2% under the age of 18, 8.0% from 18 to 24, 28.7% from 25 to 44, 29.4% from 45 to 64, and 16.8% who were 65 years of age or older. The median age was 42.9 years. For every 100 females, there were 104.4 males. For every 100 females age 18 and over, there were 97.2 males.

The median income for a household in the village was $42,031, and the median income for a family was $51,875. Males had a median income of $56,875 versus $26,771 for females. The per capita income for the village was $28,144. About 18.5% of families and 18.2% of the population were below the poverty line, including 23.6% of those under age 18 and 16.4% of those age 65 or over.

== Education ==
Portions in Will County are in the Reed Custer Community Unit School District 255U.

Portions in Grundy County are in the Braceville School District 75 and the Gardner-South Wilmington Township High School District.
