= Carbon Hill, Illinois =

Carbon Hill
- Village
- Location of Carbon Hill in Grundy County, Illinois
- Coordinates: 41°17′49″N 88°18′00″W
- Country: United States
- State: Illinois
- County: Grundy

Government
  - Mayor: Adam Johnson

Area
  - Total: 0.18 sq mi (0.47 km^{2})
  - Land: 0.18 sq mi (0.47 km^{2})
  - Water: 0 sq mi (0.00 km^{2})
- Elevation: 558 ft (170 m)

Population (2020)
  - Total: 372
  - Density: 2,048.4/sq mi (790.91/km^{2})
- Time zone: UTC-6 (CST)
  - Summer (DST): UTC-5 (CDT)
- ZIP code: 60416
- Area codes: 815 & 779
- FIPS code: 17-11176
- GNIS feature ID: 2397551
- Website: https://villageofcarbonhill-il.gov/

Carbon Hill is a village in Grundy County, Illinois, United States. The population was 372 at the 2020 census.

== Geography ==
According to the 2021 census gazetteer files, Carbon Hill has a total area of 0.18 square miles (0.47 km^{2}), all land.

== Demographics ==
Historical population
Census	Pop.	Note	%±
1900	1,252		—
1910	820		−34.5%
1920	281		−65.7%
1930	165		−41.3%
1940	141		−14.5%
1950	158		12.1%
1960	236		49.4%
1970	317		34.3%
1980	406		28.1%
1990	362		−10.8%
2000	392		8.3%
2010	345		−12.0%
2020	372		7.8%
U.S. Decennial Census

As of the 2020 census there were 372 people, 139 households, and 96 families residing in the village. The population density was 2,089.89 inhabitants per square mile (806.91/km^{2}). There were 154 housing units at an average density of 865.17 per square mile (334.04/km^{2}). The racial makeup of the village was 90.32% White, 0.81% African American, 0.00% Native American, 1.08% Asian, 0.00% Pacific Islander, 3.23% from other races, and 4.57% from two or more races. Hispanic or Latino of any race were 9.41% of the population.

There were 139 households, out of which 36.7% had children under the age of 18 living with them, 60.43% were married couples living together, 6.47% had a female householder with no husband present, and 30.94% were non-families. 28.06% of all households were made up of individuals, and 9.35% had someone living alone who was 65 years of age or older. The average household size was 3.43 and the average family size was 2.78.

The village's age distribution consisted of 33.9% under the age of 18, 4.9% from 18 to 24, 26% from 25 to 44, 19.1% from 45 to 64, and 16.1% who were 65 years of age or older. The median age was 30.8 years. For every 100 females, there were 89.2 males. For every 100 females age 18 and over, there were 94.7 males.

The median income for a household in the village was $66,250, and the median income for a family was $72,500. Males had a median income of $42,404 versus $34,643 for females. The per capita income for the village was $26,937. About 7.3% of families and 7.1% of the population were below the poverty line, including 9.4% of those under age 18 and 1.6% of those age 65 or over.

== Education ==
It is in the Coal City Community Unit School District 1.
