= Wauponsee Township, Grundy County, Illinois =

Wauponsee Township
- Township
- Location in Grundy County

- Grundy County's location in Illinois
- Coordinates: 41°19′16″N 88°25′08″W
- Country: United States
- State: Illinois
- County: Grundy
- Established: November 6, 1849

Area
  - Total: 27.98 sq mi (72.5 km^{2})
  - Land: 26.79 sq mi (69.4 km^{2})
  - Water: 1.19 sq mi (3.1 km^{2}) 4.25%
- Elevation: 551 ft (168 m)

Population (2020)
  - Total: 2,289
  - Density: 85.44/sq mi (32.99/km^{2})
- Time zone: UTC-6 (CST)
  - Summer (DST): UTC-5 (CDT)
- ZIP codes: 60444, 60450
- FIPS code: 17-063-79345
- Website: www.wauponseetownship.org

Wauponsee Township is one of seventeen townships in Grundy County, Illinois, USA. As of the 2020 census, its population was 2,289 and it contained 953 housing units.

== Geography ==
According to the 2021 census gazetteer files, Wauponsee Township has a total area of 27.98 square miles (72.47 km^{2}), of which 26.79 square miles (69.39 km^{2}) (or 95.75%) is land and 1.19 square miles (3.08 km^{2}) (or 4.25%) is water.

=== Cities, towns, villages ===
- Morris (south edge)

=== Unincorporated towns ===
- Bradley Subdivision at 41.333921°N 88.457568°W
- Claypool at 41.345865°N 88.387289°W
- Claypool Woods at 41.344199°N 88.400067°W
- Gaslight Village at 41.34531°N 88.393678°W
- Lori-Sue Subdivision at 41.338365°N 88.3959°W
- Paytonville at 41.336699°N 88.431179°W
- Pebble Beach at 41.339476°N 88.400067°W
- Pine Grove at 41.339476°N 88.404511°W
- Pine Meadow Estates at 41.341421°N 88.413400°W
- Richards Park at 41.336699°N 88.424234°W
- Van Peterson Subdivision at 41.336976°N 88.4009°W
- Willow Ridge at 41.338365°N 88.423956°W

(This list is based on USGS data and may include former settlements.)

=== Cemeteries ===
The township contains Sample Cemetery.

=== Major highways ===
- Illinois Route 47

== Demographics ==
As of the 2020 census there were 2,289 people, 1,015 households, and 654 families residing in the township. The population density was 81.82 inhabitants per square mile (31.59/km^{2}). There were 953 housing units at an average density of 34.06 per square mile (13.15/km^{2}). The racial makeup of the township was 91.44% White, 0.13% African American, 0.09% Native American, 0.61% Asian, 0.00% Pacific Islander, 2.14% from other races, and 5.59% from two or more races. Hispanic or Latino of any race were 7.12% of the population.

There were 1,015 households, out of which 20.90% had children under the age of 18 living with them, 49.16% were married couples living together, 5.52% had a female householder with no spouse present, and 35.57% were non-families. 22.30% of all households were made up of individuals, and 6.30% had someone living alone who was 65 years of age or older. The average household size was 2.06 and the average family size was 2.36.

The township's age distribution consisted of 11.3% under the age of 18, 6.3% from 18 to 24, 21.8% from 25 to 44, 41% from 45 to 64, and 19.6% who were 65 years of age or older. The median age was 49.9 years. For every 100 females, there were 111.4 males. For every 100 females age 18 and over, there were 112.8 males.

The median income for a household in the township was $86,042, and the median income for a family was $97,500. Males had a median income of $67,697 versus $31,196 for females. The per capita income for the township was $45,199. About 1.2% of families and 4.5% of the population were below the poverty line, including 10.5% of those under age 18 and 7.5% of those age 65 or over.

Historical population
Census	Pop.	Note	%±
2000	2,476		—
2010	2,483		0.3%
2020	2,289		−7.8%
U.S. Decennial Census

== School districts ==
- Coal City Community Unit School District 1
- Morris Community High School and Morris Elementary School District

== Political districts ==
- Illinois's 11th congressional district
- State House District 75
- State Senate District 38
