= Grundy County, Illinois =

County in Illinois, United States

- County
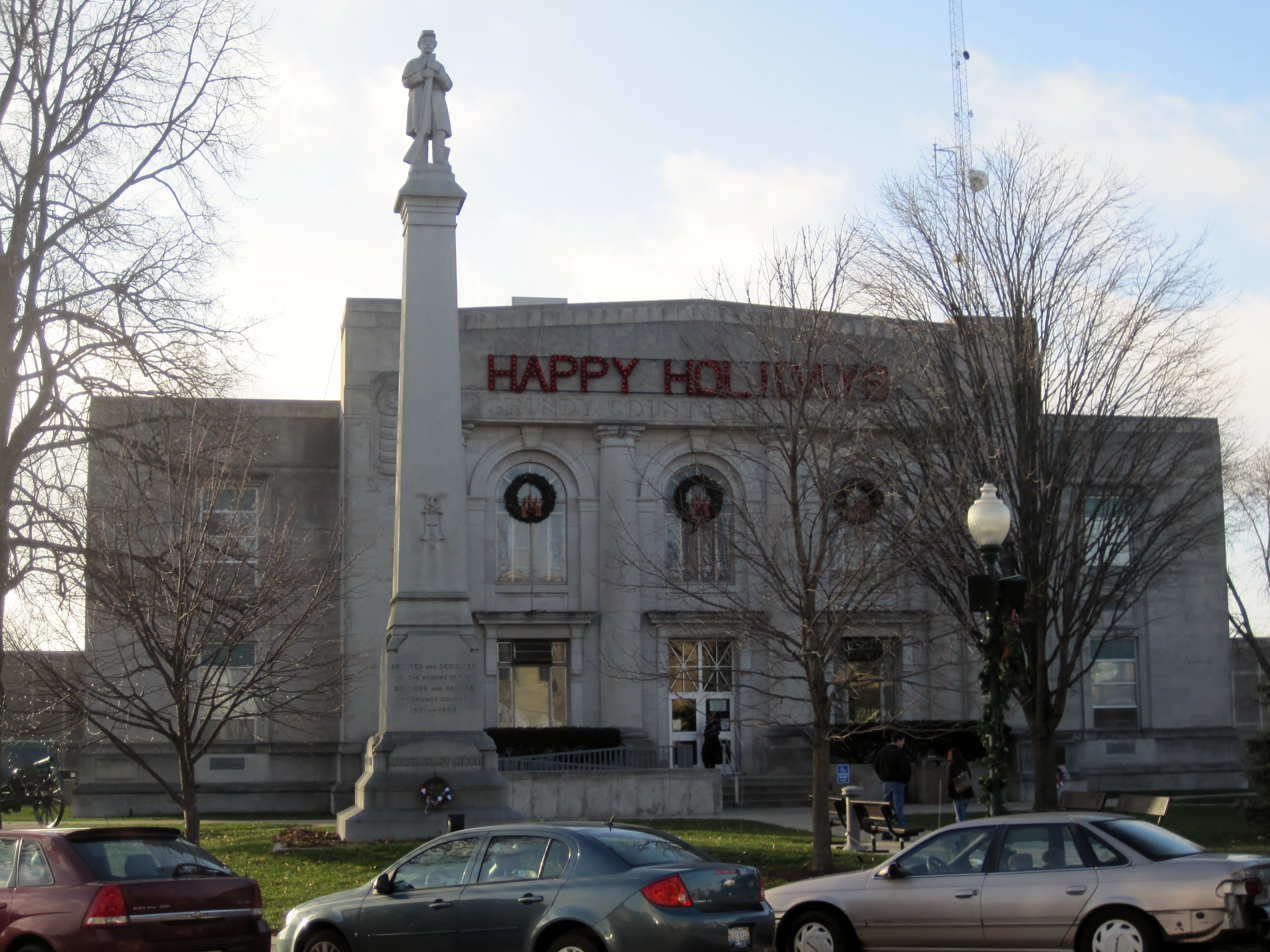
- Grundy County Courthouse

- Flag Seal

- Location within the U.S. state of Illinois
- Coordinates: 41°17′N 88°26′W
- Country: United States
- State: Illinois
- Founded: February 17, 1841
- Named for: Felix Grundy
- Seat: Morris
- Largest city: Morris

Area
  - Total: 430 sq mi (1,100 km^{2})
  - Land: 418 sq mi (1,080 km^{2})
  - Water: 12 sq mi (31 km^{2}) 2.9%

Population (2020)
  - Total: 52,533
  - Estimate (2025): 54,052 ▲
  - Density: 126/sq mi (48.5/km^{2})
- Time zone: UTC−6 (Central)
  - Summer (DST): UTC−5 (CDT)
- Congressional district: 16th
- Website: www.grundycountyil.gov

Grundy County is located in the U.S. state of Illinois. According to the 2020 census, it has a population of 52,533. Its county seat is Morris. Grundy County is part of the Chicago metropolitan area.

In 2010, the center of population of Illinois was in Grundy County, just northeast of the village of Mazon.

Illinois's state fossil is the Tully Monster (Tullimonstrum gregarium), a fossil organism first discovered in the Mazon Creek fossil beds. Grundy County is home to the Dresden Generating Station, a nuclear power plant that was the first privately financed nuclear power plant built in the United States. The county is also the location of the Morris Operation, a former nuclear fuel storage facility that has been described as the only de facto high-level radioactive waste storage site in the United States.

== History ==
Grundy County was established on February 17, 1841. It was formed out of LaSalle County and named after U.S. Attorney General Felix Grundy. The county was well known for its coal mines and attracted miners from Pennsylvania and other regions to work its deposits. The 1883 Diamond Mine Disaster occurred in Grundy County. The disaster took the lives of 69 men and boys who were trapped underground when water broke through into the mine after days of heavy rain and the pumps could not keep up with the rising water. 22 bodies were eventually recovered, the remaining 44 were left in the mine and the mine was sealed. Today a marker stands near where it was believed the majority of victims were entombed.

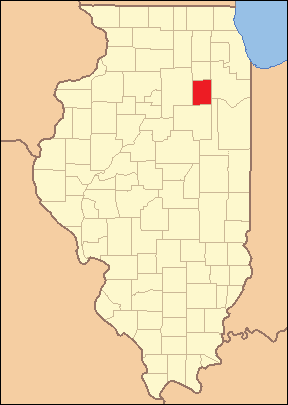
Grundy County at the time of its creation in 1841

== Geography ==
According to the U.S. Census Bureau, the county has a total area of 430 square miles (1,100 km^{2}), of which 418 square miles (1,080 km^{2}) is land and 12 square miles (31 km^{2}) (2.9%) is water.

=== Climate and weather ===
Morris, Illinois

Climate chart (precipitation, max. and min. temperature)
J	F	M	A	M	J	J	A	S	O	N	D
1.8 30 13	1.6 35 18	2.7 47 29	3.5 61 39	4 73 50	4.2 83 59	3.7 85 63	3.4 83 61	3 76 53	2.5 64 41	3.1 48 31	2.4 35 19
- █ Average max. and min. temperatures in °F
- █ Precipitation totals in inches
- Source: The Weather Channel
Metric conversion
J	F	M	A	M	J	J	A	S	O	N	D
44 −1 −11	40 2 −8	70 8 −2	90 16 4	100 23 10	106 28 15	94 29 17	86 28 16	75 24 12	65 18 5	78 9 −1	60 2 −7
- █ Average max. and min. temperatures in °C
- █ Precipitation totals in mm

In recent years, average temperatures in the county seat of Morris have ranged from a low of 13 °F (−11 °C) in January to a high of 85 °F (29 °C) in July, although a record low of −24 °F (−31 °C) was recorded in January 1985 and a record high of 103 °F (39 °C) was recorded in June 1988. Average monthly precipitation ranged from 1.59 inches (40 mm) in February to 4.16 inches (106 mm) in June.

=== Major highways ===
- I-55
- I-80
- US 6
- IL 17
- IL 47
- IL 53
- IL 113

=== Adjacent counties ===
- Kendall (north)
- Will (east)
- Kankakee (southeast)
- Livingston (south)
- LaSalle (west)

== Demographics ==
Historical population
Census	Pop.	Note	%±
1850	3,023		—
1860	10,379		243.3%
1870	14,938		43.9%
1880	16,732		12.0%
1890	21,024		25.7%
1900	24,136		14.8%
1910	24,162		0.1%
1920	18,580		−23.1%
1930	18,678		0.5%
1940	18,398		−1.5%
1950	19,217		4.5%
1960	22,350		16.3%
1970	26,535		18.7%
1980	30,582		15.3%
1990	32,337		5.7%
2000	37,535		16.1%
2010	50,063		33.4%
2020	52,533		4.9%
2025 (est.)	54,052	▲	2.9%
U.S. Decennial Census; 1790-1960 1900-1990; 1990-2000 2010

2000 census age pyramid for Grundy County

=== 2020 census ===
As of the 2020 census, the county had a population of 52,533, a median age of 38.7 years, 25.0% of residents were under the age of 18, 15.2% were 65 years of age or older, there were 99.7 males for every 100 females, and there were 96.9 males for every 100 females age 18 and over.

The racial makeup of the county was 85.9% White, 1.6% Black or African American, 0.4% American Indian and Alaska Native, 0.9% Asian, less than 0.1% Native Hawaiian and Pacific Islander, 3.4% from some other race, and 7.8% from two or more races; Hispanic or Latino residents of any race comprised 10.9% of the population.

Seventy-five percent of residents lived in urban areas, while 25.0% lived in rural areas.

There were 20,038 households in the county, of which 34.5% had children under the age of 18 living in them, 53.1% were married-couple households, 17.5% were households with a male householder and no spouse or partner present, 21.9% were households with a female householder and no spouse or partner present, 24.9% were made up of individuals, and 11.0% had someone living alone who was 65 years of age or older.

There were 21,174 housing units, of which 5.4% were vacant, 73.5% of the occupied housing units were owner-occupied, and 26.5% were renter-occupied; the homeowner vacancy rate was 1.3% and the rental vacancy rate was 7.0%.

=== Racial and ethnic composition ===
Grundy County, Illinois – Racial and ethnic composition Note: the US Census treats Hispanic/Latino as an ethnic category. This table excludes Latinos from the racial categories and assigns them to a separate category. Hispanics/Latinos may be of any race.
Race / Ethnicity (NH = Non-Hispanic)	Pop 1980	Pop 1990	Pop 2000	Pop 2010	Pop 2020	% 1980	% 1990	% 2000	% 2010	% 2020
White alone (NH)	29,838	31,433	35,502	44,526	43,472	97.57%	97.20%	94.58%	88.94%	82.75%
Black or African American alone (NH)	41	15	67	577	833	0.13%	0.05%	0.18%	1.15%	1.59%
Native American or Alaska Native alone (NH)	35	35	81	68	48	0.11%	0.11%	0.22%	0.14%	0.09%
Asian alone (NH)	108	105	112	318	466	0.35%	0.32%	0.30%	0.64%	0.89%
Native Hawaiian or Pacific Islander alone (NH)	x	x	2	12	16	x	x	0.01%	0.02%	0.03%
Other race alone (NH)	49	1	3	25	122	0.16%	0.00%	0.01%	0.05%	0.23%
Mixed race or Multiracial (NH)	x	x	216	441	1,864	x	x	0.58%	0.88%	3.55%
Hispanic or Latino (any race)	511	748	1,552	4,096	5,712	1.67%	2.31%	4.13%	8.18%	10.87%
Total	30,582	32,337	37,535	50,063	52,533	100.00%	100.00%	100.00%	100.00%	100.00%

=== 2010 census ===
As of the 2010 United States census, there were 50,063 people, 18,546 households, and 13,431 families residing in the county. The population density was 119.8 inhabitants per square mile (46.3/km^{2}). There were 19,996 housing units at an average density of 47.8 per square mile (18.5/km^{2}). The racial makeup of the county was 93.7% white, 1.2% black or African American, 0.7% Asian, 0.2% American Indian, 2.7% from other races, and 1.5% from two or more races. Those of Hispanic or Latino origin made up 8.2% of the population. In terms of ancestry, 28.3% were German, 23.0% were Irish, 12.7% were Italian, 9.4% were Polish, 8.6% were English, 7.1% were Norwegian, and 3.0% were American.

Of the 18,546 households, 38.6% had children under the age of 18 living with them, 57.8% were married couples living together, 9.7% had a female householder with no husband present, 27.6% were non-families, and 22.5% of all households were made up of individuals. The average household size was 2.69 and the average family size was 3.16. The median age was 36.1 years.

The median income for a household in the county was $64,297 and the median income for a family was $75,000. Males had a median income of $58,491 versus $36,592 for females. The per capita income for the county was $27,895. About 5.2% of families and 6.9% of the population were below the poverty line, including 8.0% of those under age 18 and 6.5% of those age 65 or over.

== Communities ==
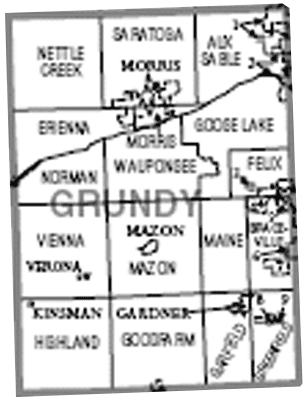
Map of Grundy County, Illinois.

=== City ===
- Morris

=== Villages ===
- Braceville
- Carbon Hill
- Channahon (part)
- Coal City (part)
- Diamond (part)
- Dwight (part)
- East Brooklyn
- Gardner
- Godley (part)
- Kinsman
- Mazon
- Minooka (mostly)
- Seneca (part)
- South Wilmington
- Verona

=== Former Communities ===
- Jugtown

=== Townships ===
Grundy County is divided into seventeen townships:

- Aux Sable
- Braceville
- Erienna
- Felix
- Garfield
- Goodfarm
- Goose Lake
- Greenfield
- Highland
- Maine
- Mazon
- Morris
- Nettle Creek
- Norman
- Saratoga
- Vienna
- Wauponsee

=== Unincorporated communities ===
- Paytonville
- Nettle Creek
- Wauponsee

== Politics ==
Grundy County is a Republican stronghold. It has only strayed from voting for Republicans in any election a handful of times. The greatest Democratic margin occurred in 1996, by less than four percent and off the back of Ross Perot's third party candidacy. The county has not voted for a Democratic governor since 1852.

United States presidential election results for Grundy County, Illinois
Year	Republican		Democratic		Third party(ies)	
Year	No.	%	No.	%	No.	%
1892	2,159	50.26%	1,892	44.04%	245	5.70%
1896	3,246	59.68%	2,074	38.13%	119	2.19%
1900	3,735	65.50%	1,687	29.59%	280	4.91%
1904	3,448	69.73%	841	17.01%	656	13.27%
1908	3,127	63.08%	1,359	27.42%	471	9.50%
1912	1,919	36.41%	1,172	22.24%	2,179	41.35%
1916	4,811	66.37%	2,241	30.91%	197	2.72%
1920	4,647	80.05%	803	13.83%	355	6.12%
1924	4,337	63.97%	742	10.94%	1,701	25.09%
1928	5,126	61.54%	3,174	38.11%	29	0.35%
1932	4,491	48.21%	4,755	51.05%	69	0.74%
1936	5,360	52.63%	4,481	44.00%	344	3.38%
1940	6,593	61.38%	4,105	38.22%	43	0.40%
1944	6,310	63.89%	3,544	35.88%	22	0.22%
1948	5,954	64.44%	3,255	35.23%	31	0.34%
1952	7,347	70.12%	3,118	29.76%	13	0.12%
1956	7,640	74.46%	2,618	25.51%	3	0.03%
1960	6,948	61.88%	4,276	38.08%	4	0.04%
1964	5,522	51.28%	5,246	48.72%	0	0.00%
1968	6,607	59.50%	3,407	30.68%	1,091	9.82%
1972	8,725	70.70%	3,584	29.04%	32	0.26%
1976	7,581	57.43%	5,534	41.92%	86	0.65%
1980	8,397	63.59%	3,970	30.07%	837	6.34%
1984	9,595	66.98%	4,671	32.61%	59	0.41%
1988	8,743	60.88%	5,525	38.47%	93	0.65%
1992	6,346	39.02%	6,122	37.64%	3,797	23.34%
1996	6,177	41.45%	6,759	45.36%	1,966	13.19%
2000	8,709	52.51%	7,516	45.32%	359	2.16%
2004	11,198	56.47%	8,463	42.68%	170	0.86%
2008	10,687	48.07%	11,063	49.76%	482	2.17%
2012	11,343	53.22%	9,451	44.34%	519	2.44%
2016	13,454	57.90%	8,065	34.71%	1,718	7.39%
2020	16,523	61.75%	9,626	35.98%	607	2.27%
2024	16,997	63.74%	9,143	34.28%	528	1.98%

== Education ==
K-12 school districts include:

- Coal City Community Unit School District 1
- Herscher Community Unit School District 2

Secondary school districts include:

- Dwight Township High School District 230
- Gardner-South Wilmington Township High School District
- Minooka Community High School District 111
- Morris Community High School District 101
- Newark Community High School District 18
- Seneca Township High School District 160

Elementary school districts include:

- Braceville School District 75
- Dwight Common School District 232
- Gardner Community Consolidated School District 72C
- Lisbon Community Consolidated School District 90
- Mazon-Verona-Kinsman Elementary School District 2C
- Miller Township Community Consolidated School District
- Minooka Community Consolidated School District 201
- Morris School District 54
- Nettle Creek Community Consolidated School District 24C
- Saratoga Community Consolidated School District 60C
- Seneca Community Consolidated School District 170
- South Wilmington Consolidated School District 74

== See also ==
- National Register of Historic Places listings in Grundy County, Illinois
