= Gardner, Illinois =

Gardner
- Village
- Location of Gardner in Grundy County, Illinois.
- Coordinates: 41°11′35″N 88°18′52″W
- Country: United States
- State: Illinois
- County: Grundy

Government
  - Mayor: Mike Serena (as of 2023)

Area
  - Total: 2.94 sq mi (7.62 km^{2})
  - Land: 2.91 sq mi (7.54 km^{2})
  - Water: 0.027 sq mi (0.07 km^{2})
- Elevation: 577 ft (176 m)

Population (2020)
  - Total: 1,366
  - Density: 469.1/sq mi (181.11/km^{2})
- Time zone: UTC-6 (CST)
  - Summer (DST): UTC-5 (CDT)
- ZIP code: 60424
- Area code: 815
- FIPS code: 17-28638
- GNIS feature ID: 2398944
- Website: www.villageofgardner.org

Gardner is a village in Grundy County, Illinois, United States. The population was 1,366 at the 2020 census.

== History ==
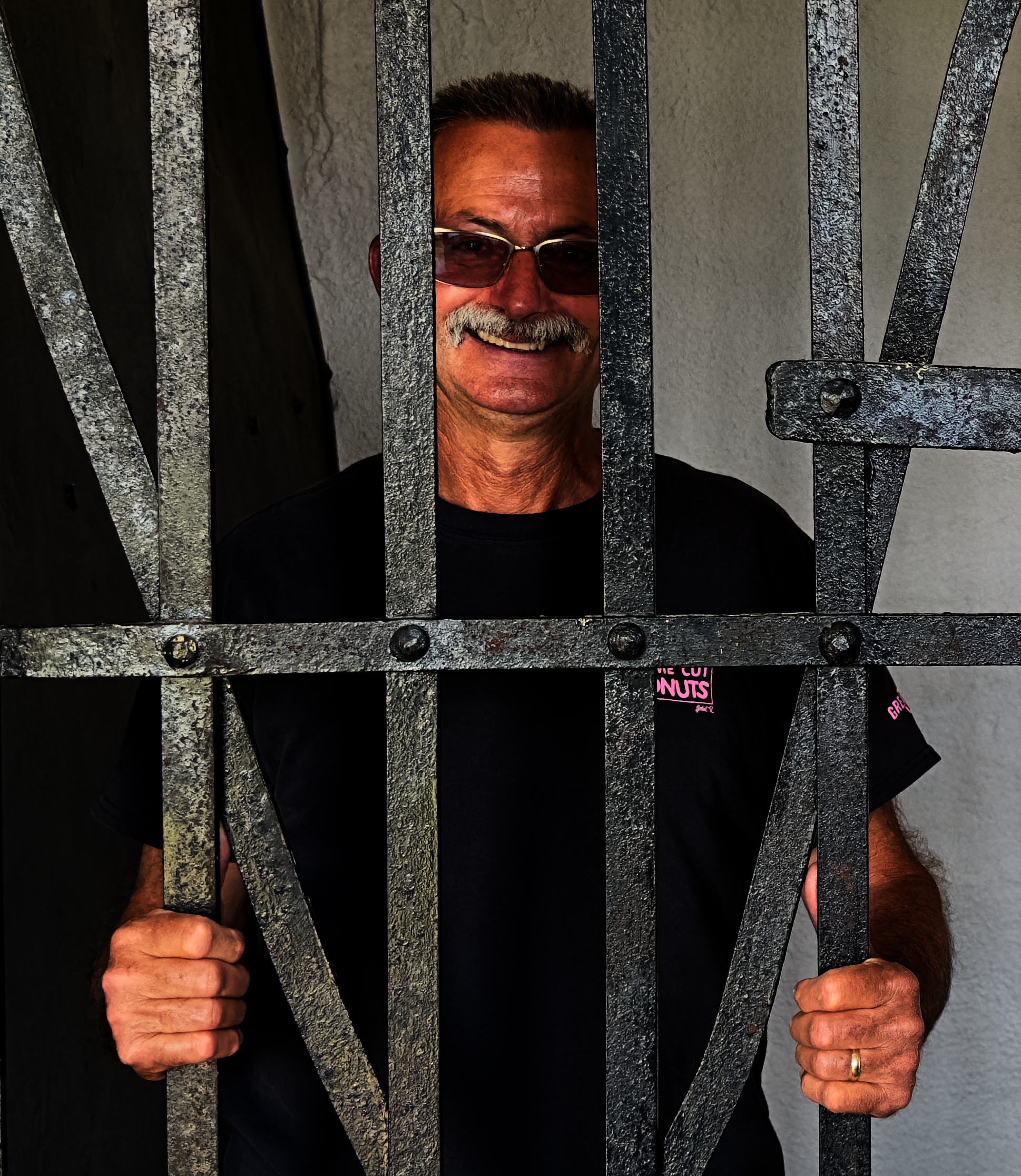
Mayor Serena in Gardner's historic two-celled jail (May 2024)

Gardner is named for its founder, Henry C. Gardner. In 2023, Mike Serena was reelected as mayor of Gardner.

== Geography ==
According to the 2021 census gazetteer files, Gardner has a total area of 2.94 square miles (7.61 km^{2}), of which 2.91 square miles (7.54 km^{2}) (or 99.01%) is land and 0.03 square miles (0.08 km^{2}) (or 0.99%) is water.

== Demographics ==
Historical population
Census	Pop.	Note	%±
1870	940		—
1880	786		−16.4%
1890	1,094		39.2%
1900	1,036		−5.3%
1910	946		−8.7%
1920	937		−1.0%
1930	869		−7.3%
1940	864		−0.6%
1950	981		13.5%
1960	1,041		6.1%
1970	1,212		16.4%
1980	1,322		9.1%
1990	1,237		−6.4%
2000	1,406		13.7%
2010	1,463		4.1%
2020	1,366		−6.6%
U.S. Decennial Census

=== 2020 census ===
As of the 2020 census, Gardner had a population of 1,366. The median age was 41.6 years. 20.6% of residents were under the age of 18 and 16.7% of residents were 65 years of age or older. For every 100 females there were 104.2 males, and for every 100 females age 18 and over there were 104.7 males age 18 and over.

0.0% of residents lived in urban areas, while 100.0% lived in rural areas.

There were 577 households in Gardner, of which 26.7% had children under the age of 18 living in them. Of all households, 46.8% were married-couple households, 22.9% were households with a male householder and no spouse or partner present, and 22.2% were households with a female householder and no spouse or partner present. About 31.7% of all households were made up of individuals and 12.3% had someone living alone who was 65 years of age or older.

There were 619 housing units, of which 6.8% were vacant, at an average density of 210.47 per square mile (81.26/km^{2}). The homeowner vacancy rate was 3.3% and the rental vacancy rate was 6.5%. The population density was 464.47 inhabitants per square mile (179.33/km^{2}).

Racial composition as of the 2020 census
Race	Number	Percent
White	1,254	91.8%
Black or African American	7	0.5%
American Indian and Alaska Native	8	0.6%
Asian	8	0.6%
Native Hawaiian and Other Pacific Islander	0	0.0%
Some other race	22	1.6%
Two or more races	67	4.9%
Hispanic or Latino (of any race)	89	6.5%

=== Income and poverty ===
The median income for a household in the village was $67,441, and the median income for a family was $71,544. Males had a median income of $56,250 versus $40,383 for females. The per capita income for the village was $35,716. About 5.1% of families and 6.2% of the population were below the poverty line, including 9.3% of those under age 18 and 8.4% of those age 65 or over.

== Education ==
It is in the Gardner Community Consolidated School District 72C and the Gardner-South Wilmington Township High School District.

== Notable people ==
- Charles L. Phillips – U.S. Army brigadier general (1856–1937)
- Robert C. Underwood – American jurist (1915–1988)
