= Morris, Illinois =

- City
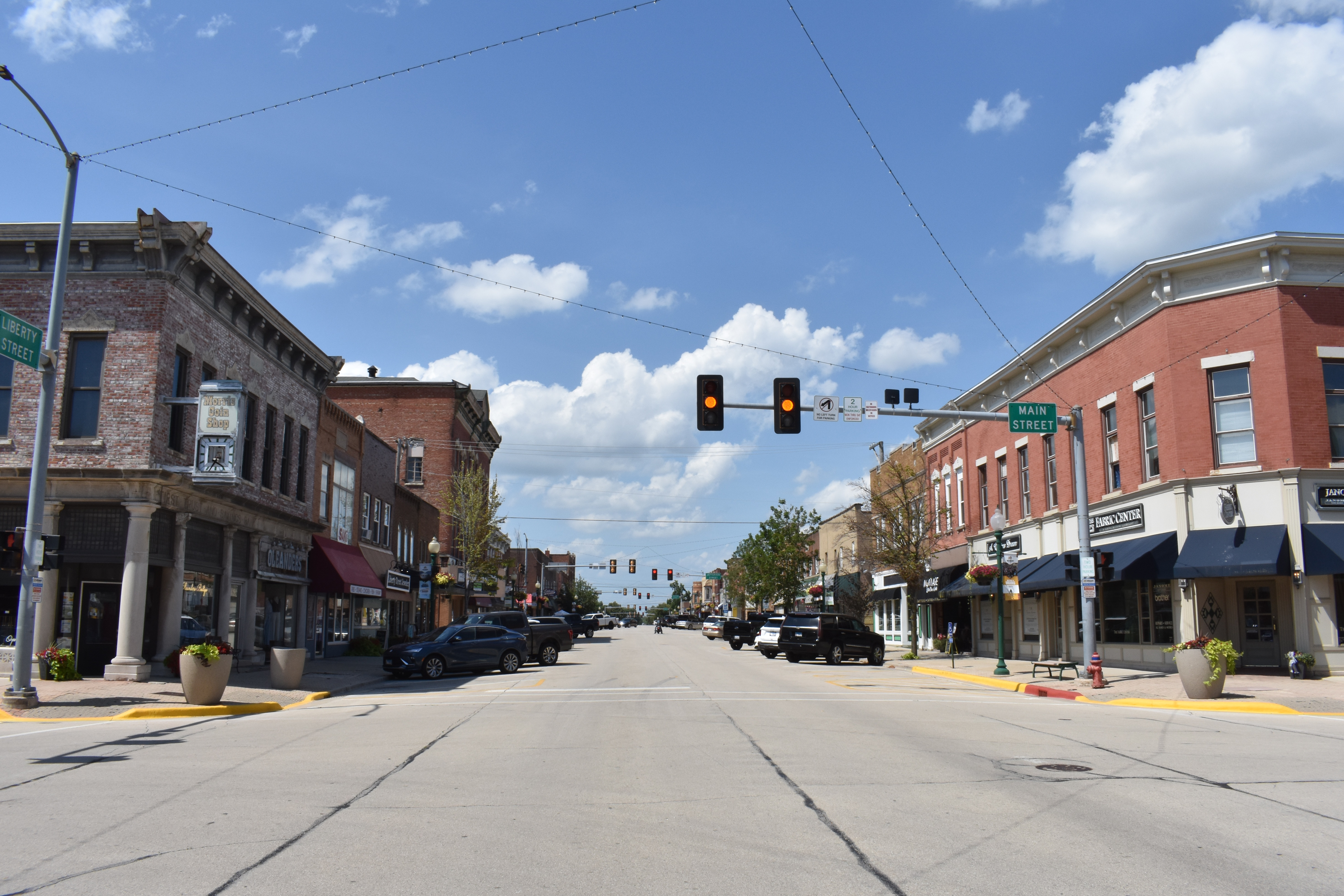
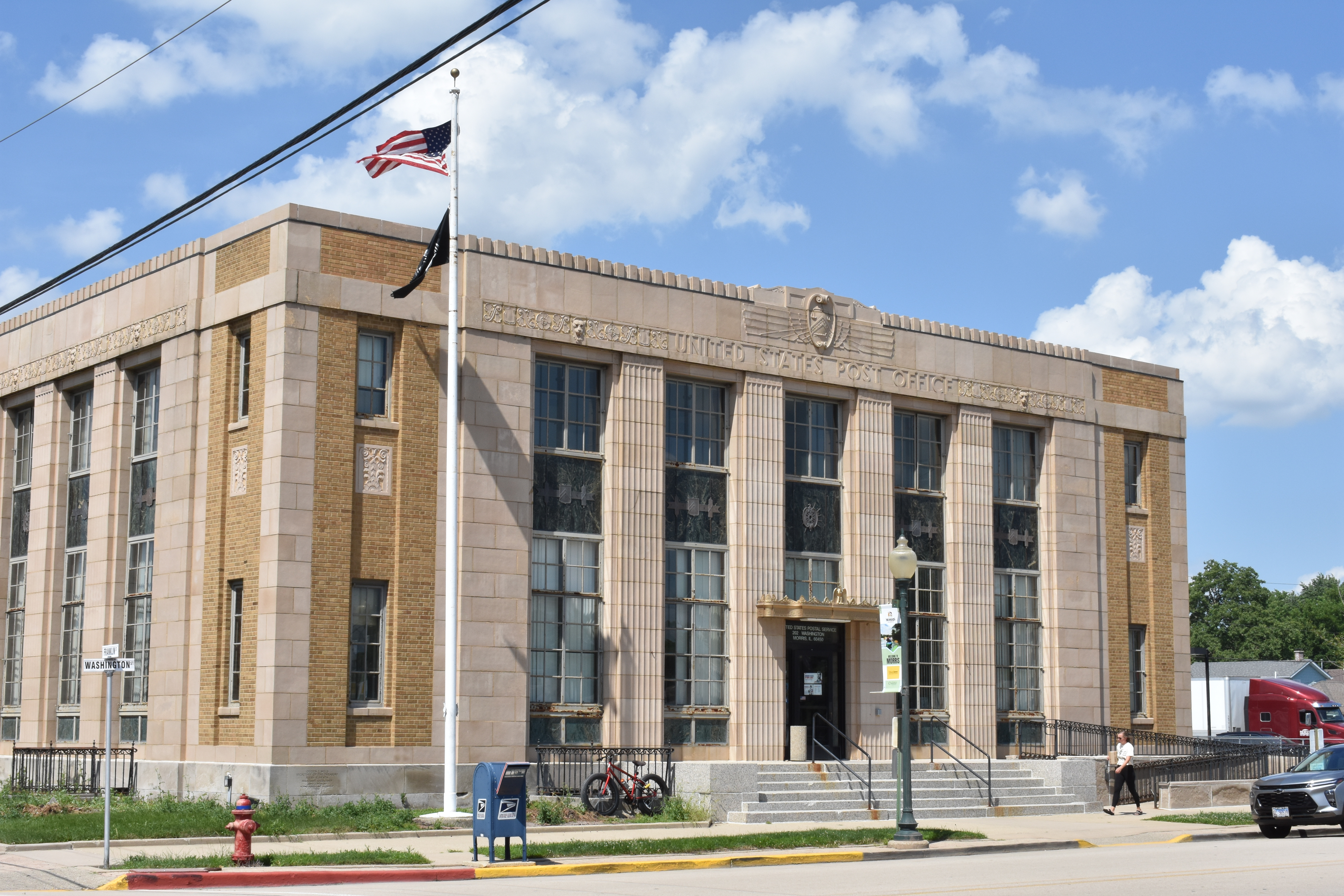
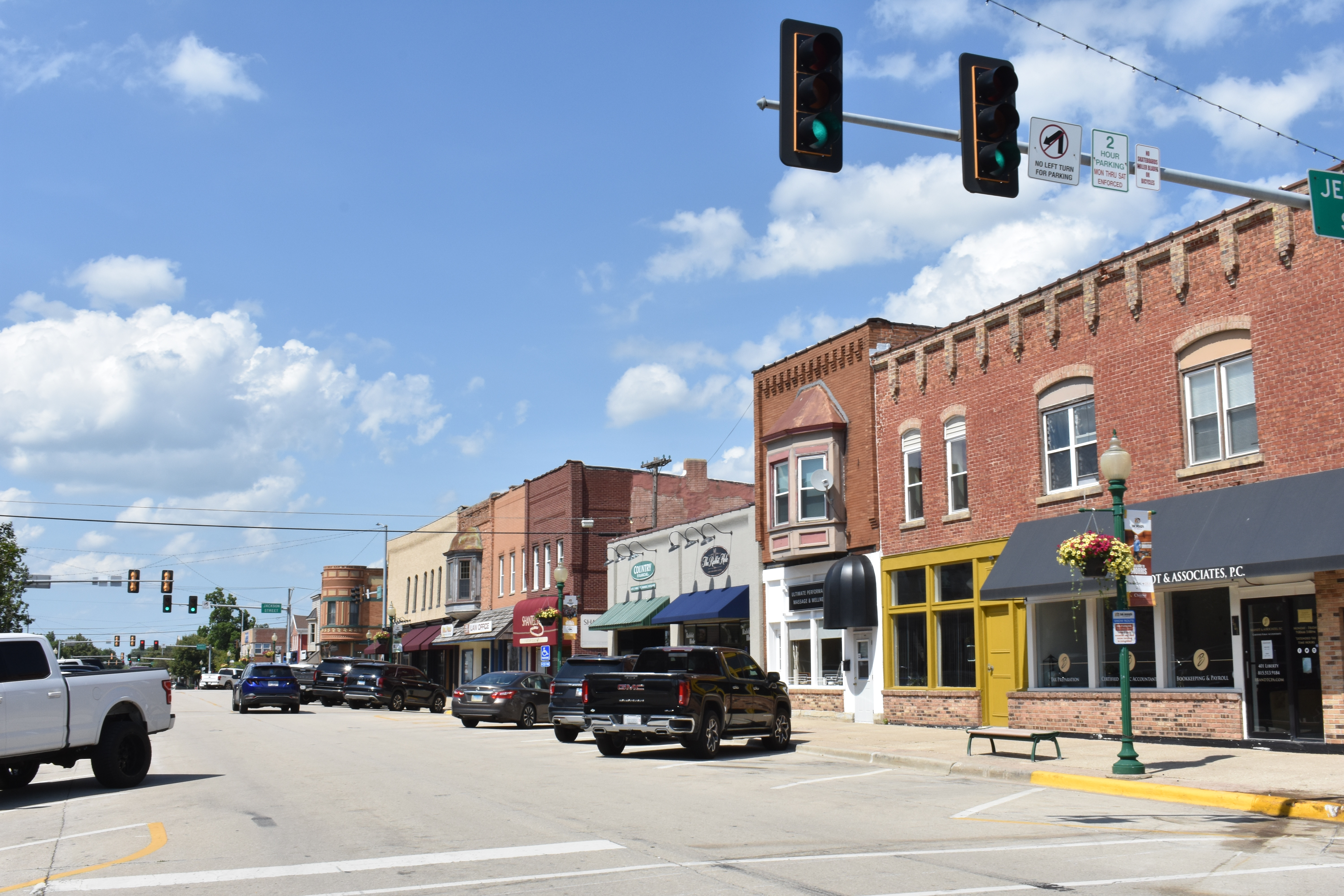
- Morris Downtown Commercial Historic District Post Office Liberty Street
- Interactive map of Morris, Illinois
- Location within Illinois Location within the United States
- Coordinates: 41°22′48″N 88°25′28″W
- Country: United States
- State: Illinois
- County: Grundy
- Townships: Morris, Erienna, Saratoga, Wauponsee
- Founded: 1842

Area
  - Total: 11.64 sq mi (30.15 km^{2})
  - Land: 11.28 sq mi (29.22 km^{2})
  - Water: 0.36 sq mi (0.93 km^{2})
- Elevation: 528 ft (161 m)

Population (2020)
  - Total: 14,163
  - Density: 1,255.2/sq mi (484.65/km^{2})
- Time zone: UTC-6 (CST)
  - Summer (DST): UTC-5 (CDT)
- ZIP code: 60450
- Area codes: 815/779
- FIPS code: 17-50491
- GNIS feature ID: 2395407
- Website: morrisil.org

Morris is a city in and the county seat of Grundy County, Illinois, United States and part of the southwest Chicago metropolitan area. The population was 14,163 as of the 2020 census.

A team of ten anthropologists and sociologists from the nearby University of Chicago studied the city in depth and reported its findings in W. Lloyd Warner, editor, Democracy in Jonesville: A Study of Quality and Inequality (1949).

== Geography ==
Morris is located in northeast Grundy County along U.S. Route 6 and Illinois Route 47 and on the north side of the Illinois River at an elevation of 515 feet (157 m).

According to the 2021 census gazetteer files, Morris has a total area of 11.64 square miles (30.15 km^{2}), of which 11.28 square miles (29.22 km^{2}) (or 96.92%) is land and 0.36 square miles (0.93 km^{2}) (or 3.08%) is water.

=== Climate ===
The annual precipitation for Morris is about 40 inches. The record high for Morris is 109 °F (43 °C) on July 14, 1936. The record low for Morris is -26 °F (−32 °C) in December 1924. The average high temperature for Morris in July is 84.5 °F (43 °C), while the average January low is 15.4 °F (-9.2 °C).

Morris has not been struck by any major tornadoes in recent history, although they occur in Northern Illinois annually. Morris was the first town hit by the Super Outbreak of April 3–4, 1974. However, the damage within the city was relatively minor, and nobody was injured.

The city can receive heavy snowfall and experience blizzards periodically.

Climate data for Morris, Illinois (1991–2020 normals, extremes 1912–present)
Month	Jan	Feb	Mar	Apr	May	Jun	Jul	Aug	Sep	Oct	Nov	Dec	Year
Record high °F (°C)	68 (20)	74 (23)	85 (29)	93 (34)	103 (39)	106 (41)	109 (43)	107 (42)	103 (39)	95 (35)	82 (28)	72 (22)	109 (43)
Mean daily maximum °F (°C)	31.2 (−0.4)	35.6 (2.0)	47.7 (8.7)	60.9 (16.1)	72.1 (22.3)	81.7 (27.6)	84.9 (29.4)	82.7 (28.2)	77.4 (25.2)	64.4 (18.0)	49.0 (9.4)	36.7 (2.6)	60.4 (15.8)
Daily mean °F (°C)	23.4 (−4.8)	27.4 (−2.6)	38.3 (3.5)	50.3 (10.2)	61.6 (16.4)	71.4 (21.9)	75.0 (23.9)	72.8 (22.7)	66.1 (18.9)	53.6 (12.0)	40.3 (4.6)	29.1 (−1.6)	50.8 (10.4)
Mean daily minimum °F (°C)	15.7 (−9.1)	19.3 (−7.1)	28.9 (−1.7)	39.6 (4.2)	51.0 (10.6)	61.2 (16.2)	65.0 (18.3)	63.0 (17.2)	54.8 (12.7)	42.8 (6.0)	31.6 (−0.2)	21.5 (−5.8)	41.2 (5.1)
Record low °F (°C)	−23 (−31)	−22 (−30)	−19 (−28)	12 (−11)	24 (−4)	34 (1)	41 (5)	34 (1)	26 (−3)	12 (−11)	−9 (−23)	−56 (−49)	−26 (−32)
Average precipitation inches (mm)	2.09 (53)	1.79 (45)	2.23 (57)	3.34 (85)	4.39 (112)	4.72 (120)	4.92 (125)	4.01 (102)	3.55 (90)	3.23 (82)	2.50 (64)	2.02 (51)	38.79 (985)
Average snowfall inches (cm)	7.4 (19)	7.5 (19)	2.9 (7.4)	0.5 (1.3)	0.0 (0.0)	0.0 (0.0)	0.0 (0.0)	0.0 (0.0)	0.0 (0.0)	0.0 (0.0)	1.1 (2.8)	5.3 (13)	24.7 (63)
Average precipitation days (≥ 0.01 in)	10.0	8.2	9.2	10.8	13.4	11.2	9.3	9.5	8.1	10.2	8.1	9.4	117.4
Average snowy days (≥ 0.1 in)	5.9	4.3	1.8	0.5	0.0	0.0	0.0	0.0	0.0	0.1	1.0	4.0	17.6
Source: NOAA

== Demographics ==
Historical population
Census	Pop.	Note	%±
1860	2,105		—
1870	3,138		49.1%
1880	3,486		11.1%
1890	3,053		−12.4%
1900	4,273		40.0%
1910	4,563		6.8%
1920	4,505		−1.3%
1930	5,568		23.6%
1940	6,145		10.4%
1950	6,926		12.7%
1960	7,935		14.6%
1970	8,194		3.3%
1980	8,833		7.8%
1990	10,270		16.3%
2000	11,928		16.1%
2010	13,636		14.3%
2020	14,163		3.9%
U.S. Decennial Census

=== 2020 census ===
As of the 2020 census, Morris had a population of 14,163. The median age was 39.9 years. 22.9% of residents were under the age of 18 and 18.6% of residents were 65 years of age or older. For every 100 females there were 96.5 males, and for every 100 females age 18 and over there were 92.4 males age 18 and over.

99.8% of residents lived in urban areas, while 0.2% lived in rural areas.

There were 5,921 households in Morris, of which 28.8% had children under the age of 18 living in them. Of all households, 43.7% were married-couple households, 20.1% were households with a male householder and no spouse or partner present, and 28.2% were households with a female householder and no spouse or partner present. About 33.0% of all households were made up of individuals and 15.1% had someone living alone who was 65 years of age or older.

There were 6,286 housing units, of which 5.8% were vacant. The homeowner vacancy rate was 1.1% and the rental vacancy rate was 7.7%.

Racial composition as of the 2020 census
Race	Number	Percent
White	11,753	83.0%
Black or African American	309	2.2%
American Indian and Alaska Native	53	0.4%
Asian	166	1.2%
Native Hawaiian and Other Pacific Islander	9	0.1%
Some other race	685	4.8%
Two or more races	1,188	8.4%
Hispanic or Latino (of any race)	1,884	13.3%

=== Income and poverty ===
The median income for a household in the city was $61,419, and the median income for a family was $73,750. Males had a median income of $47,209 versus $32,672 for females. The per capita income for the city was $32,024. About 6.5% of families and 10.2% of the population were below the poverty line, including 18.3% of those under age 18 and 8.2% of those age 65 or over.

== Economy ==
The Allen Paper Car Wheel Works were based on East North Street in Morris, which supplied the Pullman Palace Car Company in Chicago from 1867 to 1890 with composite wheels for their railway carriages. By the 1920s, the paper mill had become one of the largest employers in Morris, producing cardboard boxes of various shapes, sizes, and colors that were shipped throughout the US.

The Lyondell Chemical Company is located about five miles (8 km) from the city center. The plant, located just off U.S. Route 6 heading eastbound away from Morris, employs many Morris residents. In addition to the chemical plant, three nuclear power plants are located within a 15-mile (24 km) radius of the center of Morris. The closest nuclear plant is only three miles (5 km) away, called the Dresden Nuclear Power Station. The LaSalle Nuclear Station is 14–15 miles (23–24 km) away, and Braidwood Generating Station is about 13 miles (21 km) away. All of the stations are owned by Exelon Corp. Among the stations, Dresden Generating Station generates energy for Chicago and surrounding areas.

=== Telephone switching history ===
In early 1960, the world's first electronic switching system was installed at the Morris central office. The system was a milestone in telephone switching history, an experiment whose planning started in the early 1950s, and led to the largest sustained research and development program toward a single goal in the Bell System. After conversion of the existing manual telephone system using telephone operators for completing telephone calls, with an automatic electromechanical crossbar switching system starting in ca. 1958, a few hundred subscribers received dial service from June 1960 through January 1962 from the first mostly electronic system, that used cold-cathode electron tubes, instead of mechanical relays and switches. For telephone subscribers, the most notable characteristic of what is usually called the Morris System was the use of electronic tone ringers which used up to eight different tones produced by a tweeter, rather than the traditional bell ringer.

== Education ==
Much of Morris is in the Morris School District 54. Parts to the north are in the Saratoga Community Consolidated School District 60C, and some parts to the west are in the Nettle Creek Community Consolidated School District 24C. All of Morris is in the Morris Community High School District 101.

== Notable people ==
- Jessie Bartlett Davis, (c. 1859–1861–1905), operatic singer and actress
- Jack Boyle, (1889–1971), third baseman for the Philadelphia Phillies
- Ed Brady, (b. 1960), former NFL linebacker
- Kelly Dransfeldt, (b. 1975), former shortstop for the Texas Rangers and Chicago White Sox
- Careen M. Gordon, (b. 1972), Member of the Illinois House of Representatives from the 75th district from 2003 to 2011
- Philip C. Hayes, (1833–1916), congressman
- Albert Kingsbury, (1863–1943), engineer, inventor and entrepreneur
- Eric J. Magnuson, (b. 1951), lawyer and Chief Justice of the Minnesota Supreme Court
- Billy Petrick, (b. 1984), former pitcher for the Chicago Cubs
- Walter M. Pierce, (1861–1954), congressman from Oregon's 2nd congressional district and 17th governor of Oregon
- Lyman Beecher Ray (1831–1916), lieutenant governor of Illinois 1889–93, politician and Morris shopkeeper
- Scott Spiezio, (b. 1972), former Major League Baseball third baseman
- Ronald Steel, (b. 1931), award-winning writer, historian, and professor
- James R. Washburn (1921–2007), Illinois state representative and mayor of Morris
- Jerry Weller, (b. 1957), former congressman from the 11th District of Illinois
- Anne Yatco, (b. 1984), voice actress
