= Volunteer (disambiguation) =

Volunteering is the practice of people working on behalf of others without being motivated by financial or material gain.

Volunteer or volunteers may also refer to:

== Volunteerism ==
- Voluntears, Disney cast members who volunteer their time for charitable or community causes
- Loyal Volunteers, a white settler movement in the Conococheague Valley of colonial Pennsylvania sometimes known as the Black Boys Rebellion

=== Military and paramilitary ===
- Military volunteer, may refer to either non-conscripts, or to reservists

==== American and Irish ====
- Volunteer (Irish republican), a member of various paramilitary organisations
- Volunteer (Ulster loyalist), a title used by a number of paramilitary organisations
- Volunteers of Ireland, a Loyalist American regiment of Irish ancestry 1778–84
- Irish Volunteers, a former paramilitary organisation
- Irish Volunteers (18th century), formed to support the Irish Patriot Party 1778–85

==== British ====
- British Volunteer Corps, a home defence force raised as part of the British anti-invasion preparations of 1803–1805
- Volunteer Force, a home defence force from 1857 to 1908

=== Religious ===
- Volunteers of America, a social welfare group

== Film and television ==
- The Volunteer (1917 film), an American silent drama film
- The Volunteer (1944 film), a recruitment short
- Volunteers (1958 film), a Soviet feature film
- Volunteers (1985 film), a comedy starring John Candy and Tom Hanks
- "Volunteers" (Abbott Elementary), a 2025 episode of the workplace sitcom
- "The Volunteer" (Full House), a 1991 episode of the family sitcom

== Books ==
- The Auschwitz Volunteer: Beyond Bravery, a 2012 book reprinting a report by Witold Pilecki
- The Volunteer: One Man's Mission to Lead an Underground Army Inside Auschwitz and Stop the Holocaust, a 2019 book by Jack Fairweather about Pilecki

== Music ==
- Volunteers (Jefferson Airplane album), 1969
- Volunteer (Sham 69 album), 1988
- Volunteers (Spear of Destiny album), 2001
- Volunteer (Old Crow Medicine Show album), 2018
- The Volunteers (album) (2004), by onelinedrawing
- "Volunteers" (song), by Jefferson Airplane
- "The Volunteer" (1966), a single by Autry Inman

== Places ==
- Volunteer Hotel, Balmain, a former pub in Sydney, Australia
- The Volunteer, Sale, a public house in Greater Manchester, England
- Volunteer Island, among the Line Islands of Kiribati
- Volunteer Park, Armadale, a football ground in West Lothian, Scotland
- Volunteer Point, Falkland Islands

=== United States ===
- Volunteer, North Carolina, an unincorporated community
- Volunteer Park (Seattle), a park in Washington
- Volunteer State Community College, in Gallatin, Tennessee
- The Volunteer State, nickname for Tennessee

== Ships ==
- Volunteer (yacht), winner of the 1887 America's Cup
- HMS Volunteer, the name of more than one ship of the British Royal Navy
- The Volunteer (canal boat), operational replica of a 19th-century canal boat based in Illinois, United States
- USS Volunteer, the name of more than one United States Navy ship

== Sports ==
- Volunteer State Athletic Conference, a defunct Tennessee college conference
- Volunteer 500, the original name of the Sharpie 500 NASCAR race
- Tennessee Volunteers, the sports teams of the University of Tennessee

== Other uses ==
- Volunteer (botany), a desirable plant that grows on its own, rather than being planted
- Volunteer (capital punishment), a prisoner who wishes to be sentenced to death
- A Volunteer, an 1860 painting by Henry Nelson O'Neil

== See also ==
- Voluntarism (disambiguation)
- Voluntary (disambiguation)
- The Volunteers (disambiguation)
