= Chicago and Joliet Electric Railway =

Interurban railway in Chicago

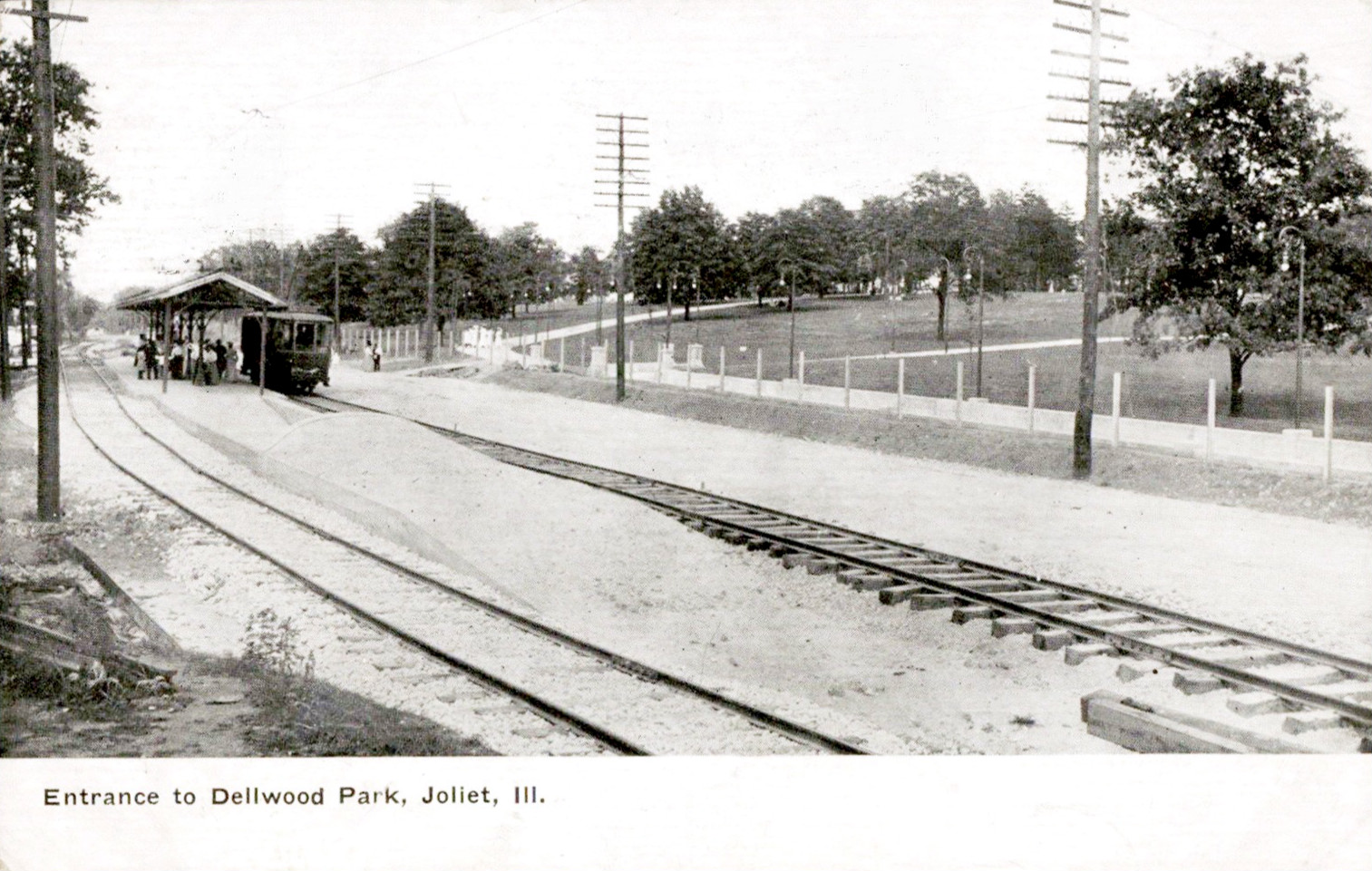
- The stop at the entrance to Dellwood Park

Overview
- Main region: Southwest suburbs of Chicago
- Locale: Joliet–Chicago
- Dates of operation: 1900–1934

The Chicago and Joliet Electric Railway, or C&JE, was an electric interurban railway linking the cities of Chicago and Joliet, Illinois. It was the only interurban between those cities and provided a link between the streetcar network of Chicago and the cities along the Des Plaines River Valley in north central Illinois, which were served by the Illinois Valley Division of the Illinois Traction System.

== History ==
The C&JE was an outgrowth of the Joliet streetcar system, which was acquired by the American Railways Company of Philadelphia at the start of the 20th century. In 1900 a line was built north from Joliet to Lemont, with an extension to Chicago opening in September 1901. The line ran along the DesPlaines River from downtown Joliet to the corner of Archer Avenue and Cicero Avenue on the edge of Chicago, with an across-the-platform connection with Chicago City Railway (Chicago Surface Lines after 1914) Archer Ave. streetcars.

A carbarn and transformer were built in Lyons Township (Bedford Park after 1940)) at Roberts Road, the railway's property behind it was sold for a large corn processing plant. "Argo" (annexed by Summit in 1911) had heavy traffic. Bethnia and Resurrection cemeteries and nearby restaurants attracted riders, and further west forest preserves were popular on the weekends.

To promote ridership on the south part of the line, the railway built an amusement park called Dellwood Park in Lockport. The park opened on July 4, 1905, at a cost to the railway of almost $300,000. Dellwood Park's carousel, boat rides, picnic areas and sulky races with a grandstand brought up to 15,000 visitors to the park on weekends in its peak years. It operated for more than thirty years; the park burned down in the 1930s.

In 1915 the C&JE became a subsidiary of Central Illinois Public Service Company, which was owned by Samuel Insull. Despite the use of modern suburban-type interurban cars, C&JE ridership plummeted with the onset of the Great Depression and on November 16, 1933, the rail line between Lockport and Argo was abandoned.

In 1933 the railway's subsidiary Chicago and Joliet Transportation Co. replaced most rail operation with buses. The heavy traffic Cicero-Argo segment stayed in service until 1934, when it became a CSL local bus route. In 1928 the route was extended to downtown Chicago. In 1936 the route was sold to Bluebird Coach, in time it would be operated by West Suburban Transit (1965), Valley Transit and subsidiary S.W.I.F.T. (1973), Joliet Mass Transit District (1975), and Pace (1990). In 2016 parts of the route are used by Pace, but it is no longer a through route.

== Route ==
The North Terminal was at Archer and Cicero Aves., where there was a twin-loop arrangement with CCRy (CSL after 1914) Archer Ave streetcars. There was a shared station and cross platform changes could be made between the two. The two loops were not physically connected, and there was no joint trackage. There also was a stub track in Archer Ave. to store cars.

The track went west down both sides of Archer to Harlem Ave. The discontinuance of the line made possible the widening of Archer Ave. from two lanes to four. At Harlem Ave. the rails came together in the middle of the street pavement and continued west. At today's 1st. Ave. interchange the rails went around a curve where Archer turns south and changes from Avenue to Road. The Lyons branch went north from here. Going south on Archer Rd. double track continued to Argo at 63rd St. Just south the rails combined to a single track to cross the Indiana Harbor Belt Railroad at grade then split to both sides of the road. At Roberts Road a six car carbarn and substation #3 was on the north-west side of Archer Rd., aligned with Roberts Rd. The tracks continued on both sides of Archer Rd. past Resurrection and Bethania cemetery, then south-west to Willow Springs, where they ran on the north side of the road.

The tracks left Willow Springs westbound along Archer Rd. At Sag (today's State Route 83 and 171 intersection) Archer Rd. turned south. The track combined, and single track continued west alongside the tracks of the Chicago and Alton Railroad's Joliet Subdivision, crossing the Calumet Feeder Canal (Cal-Sag Channel after 1911) on its own trestle. The tracks then aligned with Main St. Lemont, returned to double track, and continued west into town. Substation #2 was just west of Stephen St. The tracks then went west, turned south on today's New Ave., rejoined Archer Rd., and entered Lockport.

Lockport was the original north terminal of the line, after the interurban line was closed rail service south from there continued until replaced by Joliet city buses in 1934. The tracks went down State St. (on Archer Rd. alignment) past the company office, and Dellwood Park then`into Joliet on Collins Ave. At Cass St. the line turned west onto local streetcar tracks, at Ottawa St. it turned south and went one block to the terminal at Ottawa and Clinton Sts.

The Lyons branch was a single track streetcar line. It began at Ogden and Lawndale Aves. in Lyons, the end of a Chicago Consolidated Traction Co. (Chicago and West Towns Railway after 1913) streetcar line. It went south in Lawndale Ave., crossed Joliet Rd., and went down into the river valley. It crossed the Des Plaines River, Chicago Sanitary and Ship Canal, and Illinois and Michigan Canal on road bridges, went under the Chicago & Alton RR and then climbed up to the Archer Ave./Rd. intersection. Runs which connected with the interurban stopped here, Argo runs continued down the main line to 63rd St.

== Remnants ==
In 2015 the shared terminal at Archer and Cicero Aves. had been commercially developed, only a small CTA bus turnaround off Cicero Ave. remained. The Roberts Road carbarn had been a banquet hall and catering service, "The Landmark". The business closed in 2015. The right-of-way is still visible in parts of Willow Springs and parts are now used for parking. In Lockport Dellwood Park is in the Lockport Township Park District.
