= Chicago, Ottawa and Peoria Railway =

Overview
- Main region: Illinois River Valley
- Locale: Princeton–Joliet; Ladd–Spring Valley; Streator–Ottawa
- Dates of operation: 1904–1934
Route map
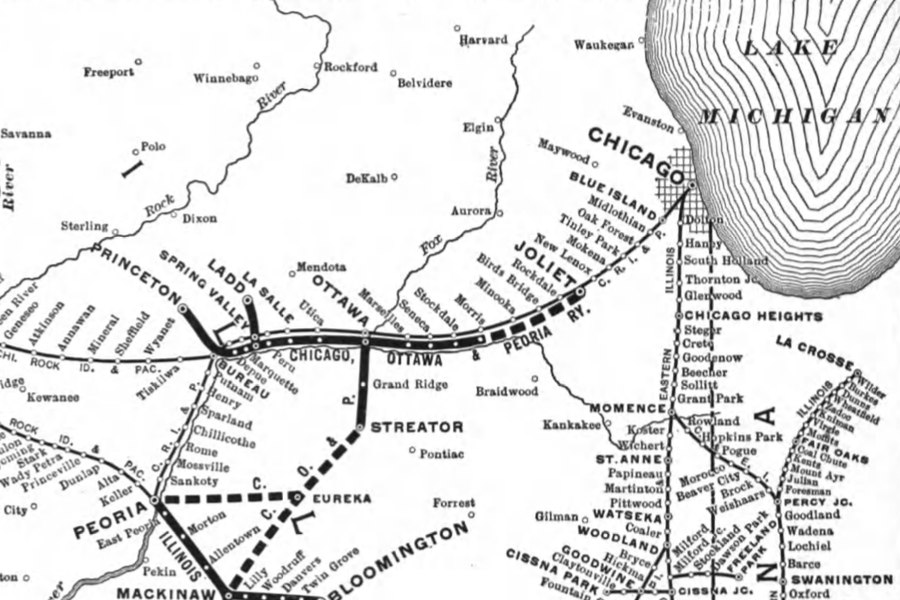

The Chicago, Ottawa and Peoria Railway, or CO&P, was an electric interurban railway running along the Illinois River Valley between Joliet and Princeton. It was one of the longest lines in the state and was unique as an isolated section of the Illinois Traction System. Intended to be a part of the planned Chicago-Peoria-St. Louis system, the section between the CO&P at Streator and the ITS at Mackinaw Junction was never built, leaving the former line separate from the rest of the ITS. The CO&P provided regular service to the cities along the Illinois Valley until its failure at the height of the Great Depression.

== History ==
The CO&P was constructed in several different sections. The first segment, from Ladd through Peru and LaSalle to Ottawa, was constructed in 1904, with an extension from Ottawa east to Marseilles completed later that year. Two years later the line was extended in both directions, west from Marquette to Princeton and east from Marseilles to Seneca. Construction continued eastward, the route reaching Morris in 1909 and Joliet in 1912, where it connected with the Chicago and Joliet Electric Railway. A branch to Streator was built in 1908.

In 1923 the CO&P became the Illinois Valley Division of the Illinois Traction System, and beginning in 1924 the rolling stock used was modernized from heavy wooden combines to lightweight steel coaches. The line was lightly built and never carried much freight, depending almost entirely on passenger service. Service out of Joliet was hourly with alternating trains west of Spring Valley terminating at Princeton and Ladd, plus two-hour service to Streator.

The first abandonment along the Illinois Valley Division ("Iv-Div") was the branch from Spring Valley to Ladd, which was abandoned in 1924. In 1929 the Streator branch was abandoned and the west end of the mainline was cut back to Depue. The Great Depression proved too much for the railway to bear, and in 1934 the entire route was abandoned.

Several of the lightweight cars used during the final decade of service on the Illinois Valley Division were transferred to the suburban operations in St. Louis run by the Illinois Terminal Railroad, successor to the ITS, and these cars operated in this service until 1958. Two of the former Illinois Valley Division lightweights, cars 62 and 64 (later ITRR 410 and 415 respectively) are preserved, 62/410 at the National Museum of Transportation and 64/415 at the Illinois Railway Museum.

== Bibliography ==
- Hilton, George W. & Due, John Fitzgerald (1960). The Electric Interurban Railways in America. Stanford, California: Stanford University Press. p. 339. OCLC 237973.
