= Involuntary =

Involuntary means unintended. An involuntary action is one that is unintentional, i.e. without volition or will; see volition (psychology) and will (philosophy). Involuntary may also refer to:

- Involuntary (film), a 2008 Swedish film by Ruben Östlund
- "Involuntary" (Masters of Sex), a 2013 television episode
- "Involuntary", a song on the M. Ward album Transfiguration of Vincent
- Involuntary action of the body, also known as reflex
- Involuntary commitment, psychiatric examination and/or treatment without patient's consent (including inability to give consent)
- Involuntary Witness, Italian novel
- Involuntary park, reclaimed urban region
- Involuntary celibate
- Involuntary dismissal, court procedure
- Involuntary unemployment, unemployment based on wage
- Involuntary euthanasia, criminal form of euthanasia

== See also ==
- Voluntary (disambiguation)
