= Illinois River =

River in Illinois, USA

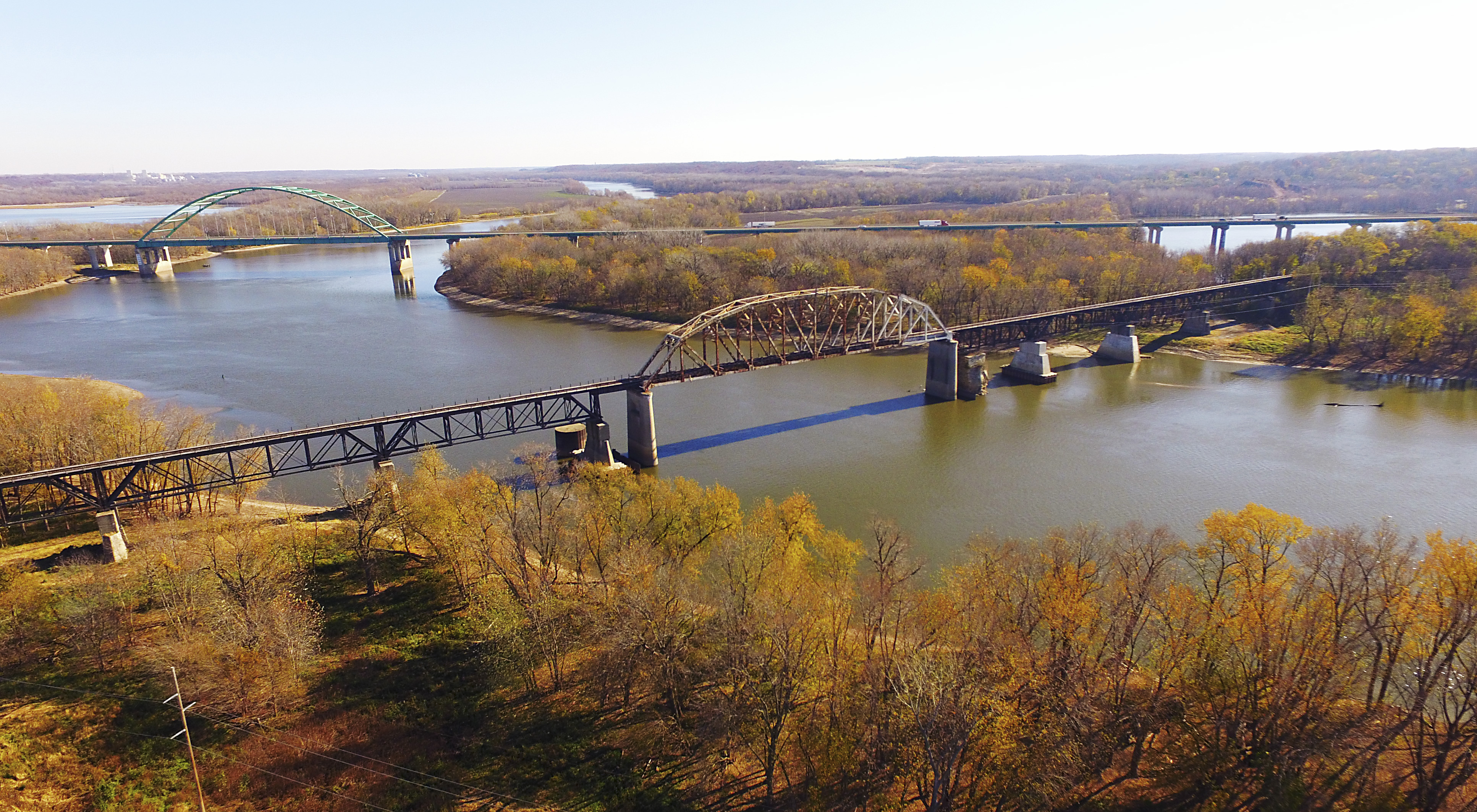
- Illinois River valley, Abraham Lincoln Memorial Bridge, and LaSalle Rail Bridge near LaSalle, Illinois

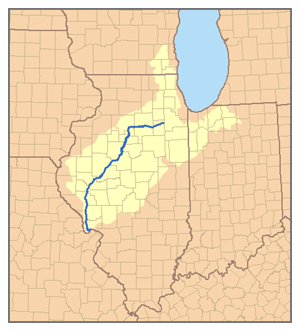
- Map of the Illinois River watershed

Location
- Country: United States
- State: Illinois

Physical characteristics
- Source: Confluence of the Kankakee and Des Plaines Rivers
  - location: Grundy County
  - coordinates: 41°23′37″N 88°15′37″W
  - elevation: 505 ft (154 m)
- Mouth: Mississippi River
  - location: Grafton
  - coordinates: 38°58′13″N 90°27′15″W
  - elevation: 417 ft (127 m)
- Length: 273 mi (439 km)
- Basin size: 28,070 sq mi (72,700 km^{2})
- Discharge
  - location: Valley City, about 61.8 mi (99.5 km) from the mouth
  - average: 23,280 cu ft/s (659 m^{3}/s)
  - minimum: 1,330 cu ft/s (38 m^{3}/s)
  - maximum: 123,000 cu ft/s (3,500 m^{3}/s)

Basin features
- Progression: Illinois → Mississippi → Gulf of Mexico
- Tributaries
  - left: Kankakee River, Mazon River, Vermilion River, Mackinaw River, Sangamon River
  - right: Des Plaines River, Fox River, Illinois and Michigan Canal

The Illinois River (Miami-Illinois: Inoka Siipiiwi) is a principal tributary of the Mississippi River at approximately 273 miles (439 km) in length. Located in the U.S. state of Illinois, the river has a drainage basin of 28,756.6 square miles (74,479 km^{2}). The Illinois River begins with the confluence of the Des Plaines and Kankakee rivers in the Chicago metropolitan area, and it generally flows to the southwest across Illinois, until it empties into the Mississippi near Grafton, Illinois. Its drainage basin extends into southeastern Wisconsin, northwestern Indiana, and a very small area of southwestern Michigan in addition to central Illinois. Along its banks are several river ports, including the largest, Peoria, Illinois. Historic and recreation areas on the river include Starved Rock, and the internationally important wetlands of the Emiquon Complex and Dixon Waterfowl Refuge.

The river was important among Native Americans and French traders as the principal water route connecting the Great Lakes with the Mississippi. The French colonial settlements along these rivers formed the heart of the area known as the Illinois Country in the 17th and 18th centuries. After the construction of the Illinois and Michigan Canal and the Hennepin Canal in the 19th century, the role of the river as link between Lake Michigan and the Mississippi was extended into the era of modern industrial shipping. The Illinois now forms the basis for the Illinois Waterway, extending the river's capabilities for navigation and commercial shipping.

== Hydrography ==
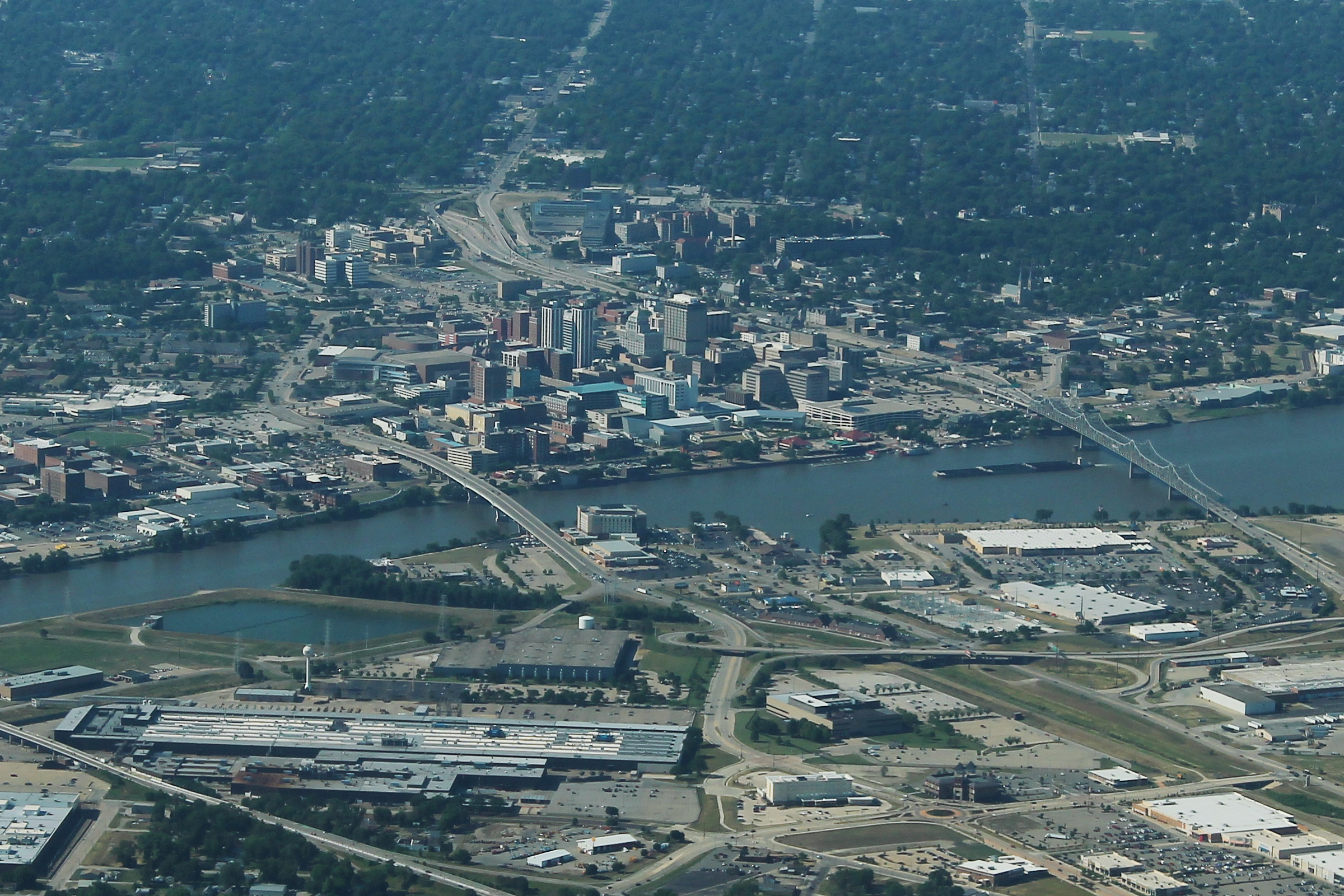
Peoria, Illinois is the largest city on the river

The Illinois River is formed by the confluence of the Kankakee River and the Des Plaines River in eastern Grundy County, approximately 10 miles (16 km) southwest of Joliet. Its other major tributaries include the Fox, Vermilion, Macoupin, Mackinaw, Spoon, Sangamon, and La Moine. This river flows west across northern Illinois, passing Morris and Ottawa, where it is joined by the Mazon River and Fox River respectively. At LaSalle, the Illinois River is joined by the Vermilion River, and then it flows west past Peru and Spring Valley. In southeastern Bureau County it turns south at an area known as the "Great Bend", flowing southwest across western Illinois, past Lacon, Henry and downtown Peoria, the chief city on the river.

South of Peoria, the Illinois River goes by East Peoria and Creve Coeur and then Pekin in Tazewell County. It is then joined by the Mackinaw River, and then passes through the Chautauqua National Wildlife Refuge. Across from Havana, the Illinois is joined by the Spoon River coming from Fulton County, and across from Browning, it is joined by the Sangamon River, which passes through the state capital, Springfield, Illinois. The La Moine River flows into it approximately five miles (8 km) southwest of Beardstown, which is south of Peoria and Pekin and northwest of Lincoln and Springfield.

Near the confluence of the Illinois with the La Moine River, it turns south, flowing roughly parallel to the Mississippi across western Illinois. Macoupin Creek joins the Illinois on the border between Greene and Jersey counties, approximately 15 miles (24 km) upstream from the confluence with the Mississippi River.

For the last 20 miles (32 km) of its course, the Illinois is separated from the Mississippi River by only about five miles (8 km), by a peninsula of land that makes up Calhoun County. The Illinois joins the Mississippi near Grafton, approximately 25 miles (40 km) northwest of downtown St. Louis and about 20 miles (32 km) upstream from the confluence of the Missouri River and the Mississippi.

== Geology ==
South of Hennepin, the Illinois River follows the ancient channel of the Mississippi River. The Illinoian Stage, about 300,000 to 132,000 years ago, blocked the Mississippi near Rock Island, diverting it into its present channel. After the glacier melted, the Illinois River flowed into the ancient channel. The Hennepin Canal roughly follows the ancient channel of the Mississippi upstream of Rock Island.

The modern channel of the Illinois River was shaped in a matter of days by the Kankakee Torrent. During the melting of the Wisconsin Glacier about 18,500 years ago, a lake formed in present-day Indiana, comparable to one of the modern Great Lakes. The lake formed behind the terminal moraine of a substage of that glacier. Melting ice to the north eventually raised the level of the lake so that it overflowed the moraine. The dam burst, and the entire volume of the lake was released in a very short time, perhaps a few days.

Because of the manner of its formation, the Illinois River runs through a deep canyon with many rock formations. It has an "underutilized channel", one far larger than would be needed to contain any conceivable flow of the modern river.

== History ==
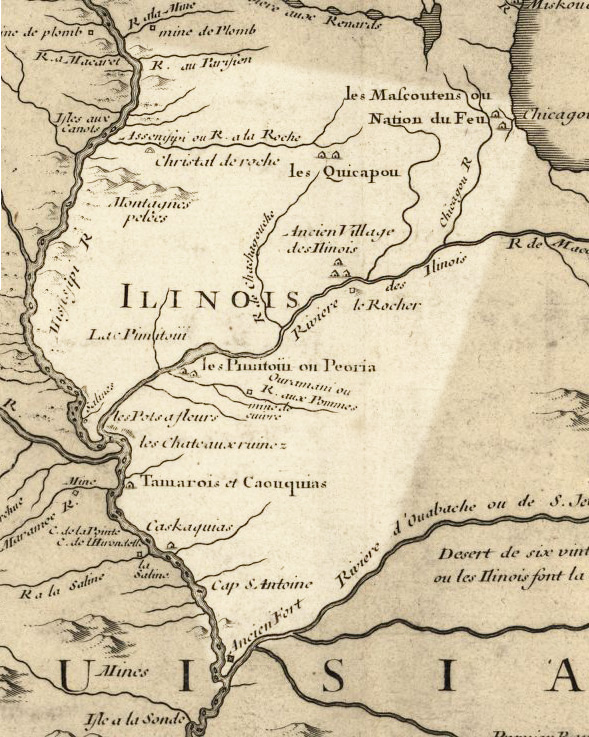
The Illinois River as mapped in 1718, approximation of modern Illinois state highlighted.

The Illinois River valley has long been an important transportation route for civilizations. The portages between the Des Plaines and Chicago Rivers and the Kankakee and St. Joseph rivers allowed Native Americans, Europeans, and later Americans access between the Great Lakes and the Mississippi basin. The first European presence in the area was the Jesuit mission founded in 1675 by Father Jacques Marquette on the banks of the Illinois across from Starved Rock at the Grand Village of the Illinois, near present-day Utica. The Illinois Confederation were the primary inhabitants of the valley. Marquette wrote of the river, "We have seen nothing like this river that we enter, as regards its fertility of soil, its prairies and woods; its cattle, elk, deer, wildcats, bustards, swans, ducks, parroquets, and even beaver. There are many small lakes and rivers. That on which we sailed is wide, deep, and still, for 65 leagues."

In 1680, René-Robert Cavelier, Sieur de La Salle built the first fort in Illinois, Ft. St. Louis, at Starved Rock to facilitate the fur trade and defend the Illinois against the Iroquois. Later the fort was relocated to the present site of Creve Coeur, near Peoria. The French retained a presence in the area, with small trading posts.

Prior to the construction of the Illinois & Michigan Canal, completed in 1845, Peoria was the only large settlement on the river. The river's trade flowed downstream to be dominated by St. Louis. After the I&M Canal was built, a string of cities, such as LaSalle, Peru, and Ottawa grew along the river, extending Chicago's influence into the Mississippi Valley. During the nineteenth and early twentieth centuries, the residents of the river towns were deeply involved in harvesting the river's fish, waterfowl, mussels, and ice. They were economically and culturally dependent on the river, building up industries such as tourism related to duck hunting and sport fishing, commercial fishing, musseling for the button factories, and ice cutting for early attempts at refrigeration for domestic and commercial use.

With the construction of the Chicago Sanitary and Ship Canal in the late 19th century, Chicago's sewage was pushed down the river rather than into Lake Michigan.

As the canal declined by the early 1900s, it was eventually replaced by the Illinois Waterway in 1933, which is still in use today.

=== Interpretation ===
As late as 2015, the Peoria Riverfront Museum contained a gallery, "Illinois River Encounter," that offered an interpretation of the river through an aquarium tank, and displays of the river's geology, ecology, social history, engineering, and commercial use. The Starved Rock Lock and Dam Visitor Center features exhibits on the Illinois River with a viewing area of the working lock in a site frequented by bald eagles.

=== Modern use ===
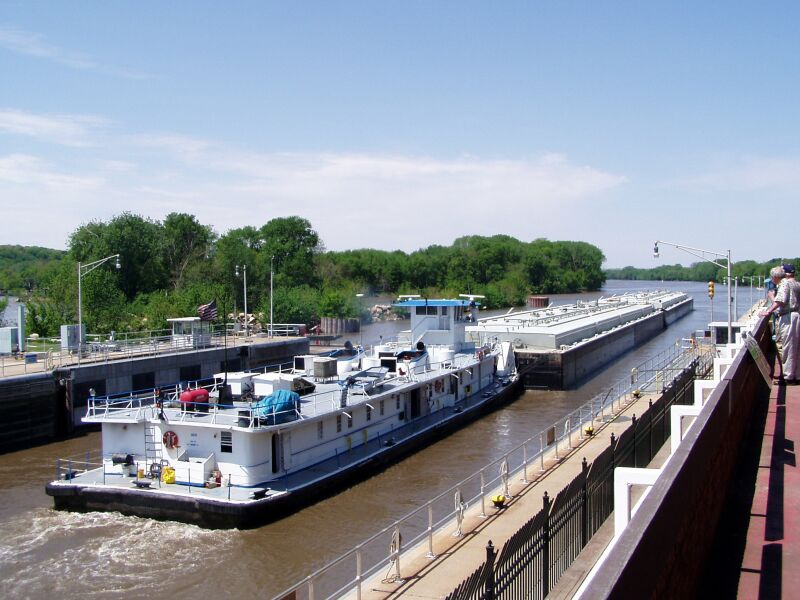
River tow leaving the Starved Rock Lock headed down river.

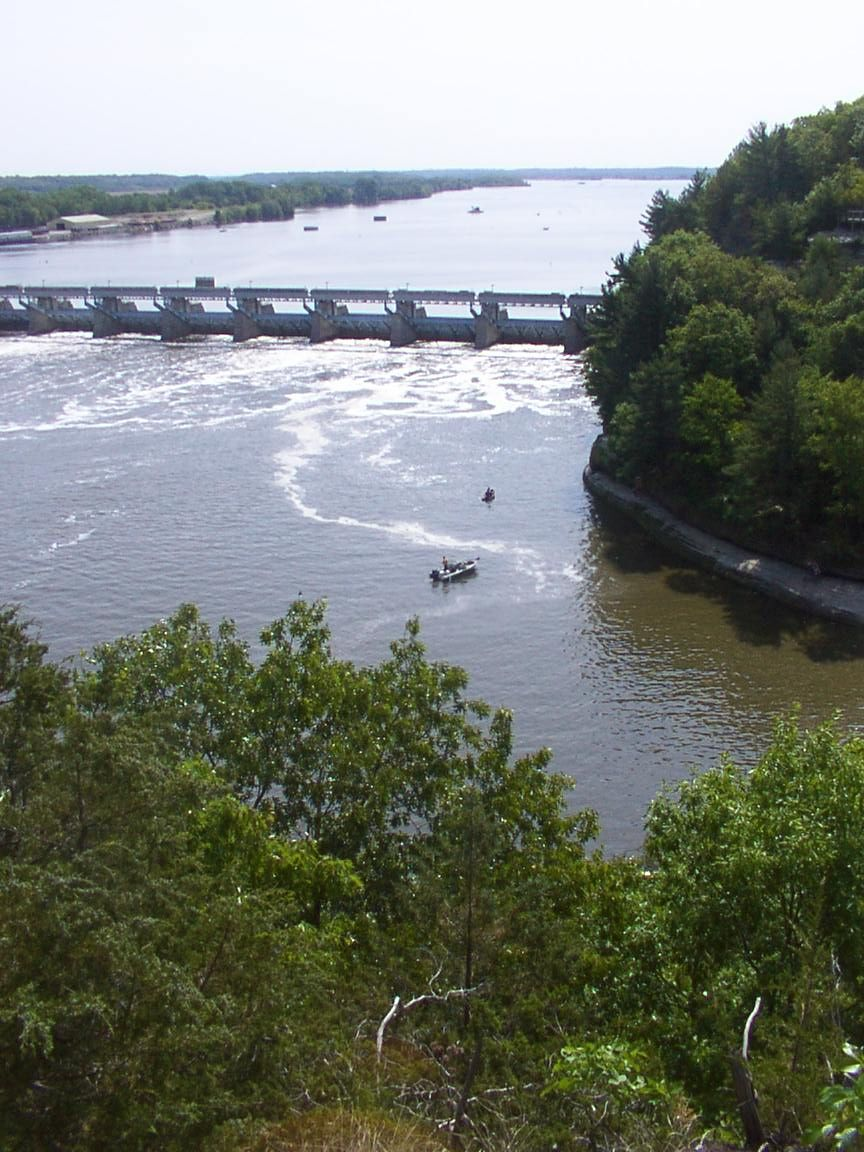
The Illinois River, as seen from Starved Rock State Park. The dam (upper-left center) is part of the infrastructure of the Illinois Waterway

From 1905 to 1915, more freshwater fish were harvested from the Illinois River than from any other river in the United States except for the Columbia River. The Illinois River was once a major source of mussels for the shell button industry. Overfishing, habitat loss from heavy siltation, and water pollution have eliminated most commercial fishing except for a small mussel harvest to provide shells to seed pearl oysters overseas. It is commercially fished downstream of the Rt. 89 bridge at Spring Valley. However, an infestation of invasive Asian carp has crowded out many game fish in the river. The Illinois River is still an important sports fishing waterway with a good sauger fishery.

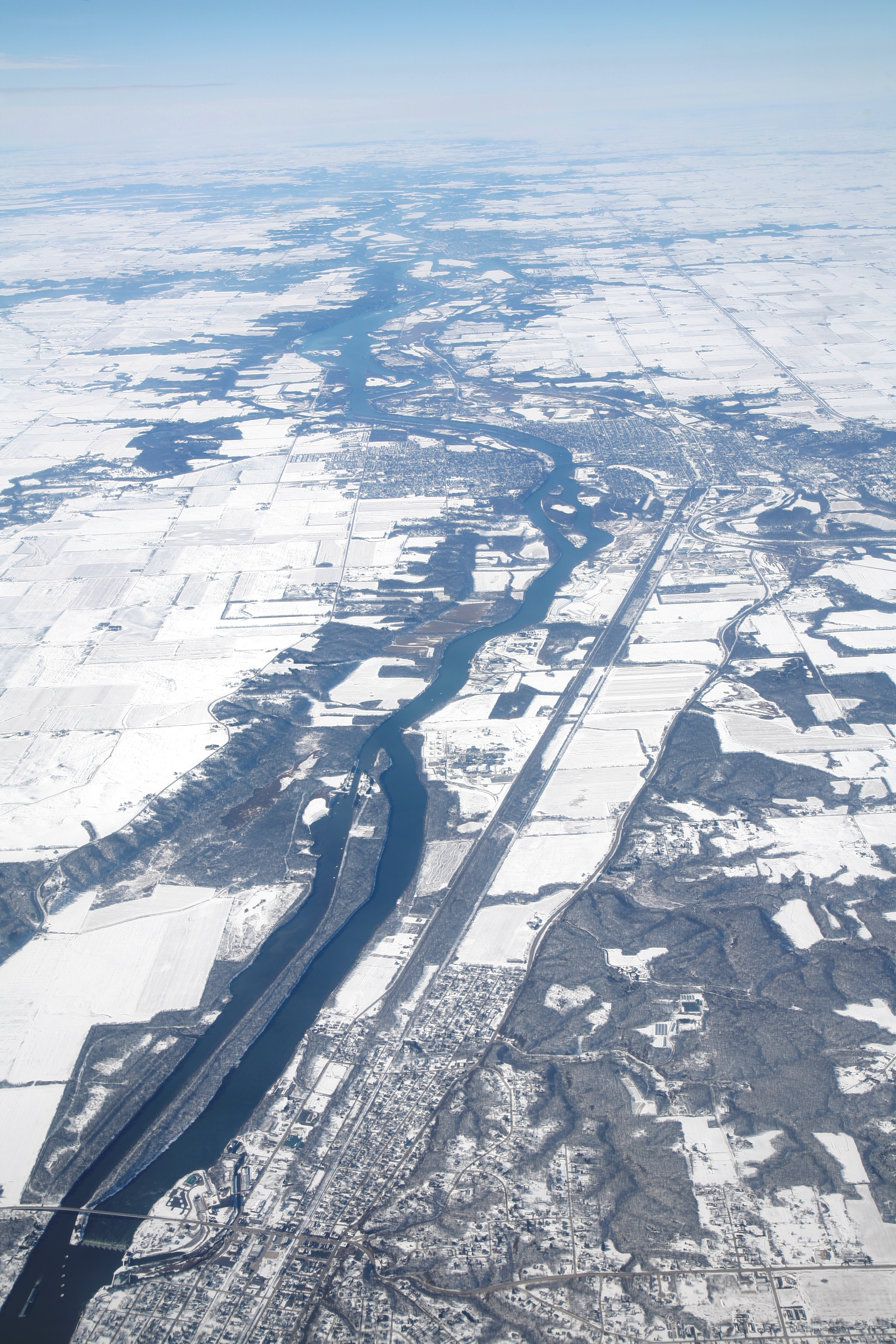
Aerial view in winter looking west along the Illinois River, with the river towns of Marseilles (bottom) and Ottawa (center frame).

The Illinois forms part of a modern waterway that connects the Great Lakes at Chicago to the Mississippi River. The waterway was originally established by the building of the Illinois and Michigan Canal that connected the Illinois River to the Chicago River. When the Sanitary District of Chicago later reversed the flow of the Chicago River, the pollution and sewage of the city of Chicago flowed down into the Illinois River. The Illinois and Michigan Canal has since been replaced by the Illinois Waterway, including the Chicago Sanitary and Ship Canal. River traffic and flood control is managed by eight locks and dams operated by the U.S. Army Corps of Engineers. As of 2011, all locks and dams on this waterway are closed to visitors for security reasons, except the Starved Rock Visitor Center, which offers an excellent interpretation of the entire system. The waterway is heavily used by barges transporting bulk goods such as grain and oil. It is used in the summer and early fall by tourists in pleasure boats cruising the Great Loop. The Illinois River is an important part of the Great Loop, the circumnavigation of Eastern North America by water.

The City of Peoria is developing a long-term plan to reduce combined sewer overflows to the Illinois River, as required by the U.S. Environmental Protection Agency and the Illinois Environmental Protection Agency. During dry weather, sewage flows safely through the city's sewers to the Greater Peoria Sanitation District wastewater treatment plant. However, about 28 times a year, melting snow or rainwater can overwhelm the sewers, causing untreated sewage to overflow into the Illinois River. Peoria was required to examine the sewer overflows and prepare a long-term control plan to meet Clean Water Act requirements and protect the Illinois River. The city had to submit its plan by December 2008 to U.S. EPA and Illinois EPA. The issue was still under discussion as recently as 2016.

The John Hartford song "Long Hot Summer Day" is written from the perspective of a barge worker on the Illinois River. It references the Illinois towns of Pekin, Beardstown, and Alton.

== Cities and towns ==
- Bath
- Beardstown
- Browning
- Chillicothe
- Chicago
- Channahon
- Creve Coeur
- East Peoria
- Florence
- Grafton
- Hardin
- Havana
- Hennepin
- Henry
- Kampsville
- Kingston Mines
- LaSalle
- Lacon
- Liverpool
- Marseilles
- Meredosia
- Morris
- Naplate
- Naples
- North Utica
- Oglesby
- Ottawa
- Pearl
- Pekin
- Peoria
- Peoria Heights
- Peru
- Rome
- Seneca
- Spring Bay
- Spring Valley
- Valley City

== See also ==
- Asian carp in North America
- Channahon State Park
- Gebhard Woods State Park
- Illinois and Michigan Canal
- List of crossings of the Illinois River
- List of rivers of Illinois
- Rivers of America Series
- Shabbona Trail
