= The Volunteers =

The Volunteers may refer to:

- The Volunteers (play), a 1692 comedy by Thomas Shadwell
- The Volunteers (painting), an 1860 painting by Frederick Daniel Hardy
- The Volunteers, a Korean band with lead singer Yerin Baek
- The Volunteers, a Norwegian band with lead singer Sivert Høyem
- The Volunteers, a 2004 album by Jonah Matranga recording as onelinedrawing
- The Volunteers, a musical farce about the Whiskey Rebellion, by Susanna Rowson
- Tennessee Volunteers, the sports teams of the University of Tennessee

== See also ==
- Volunteer (disambiguation)
