= USS Volunteer (1863) =

Gunboat of the United States Navy

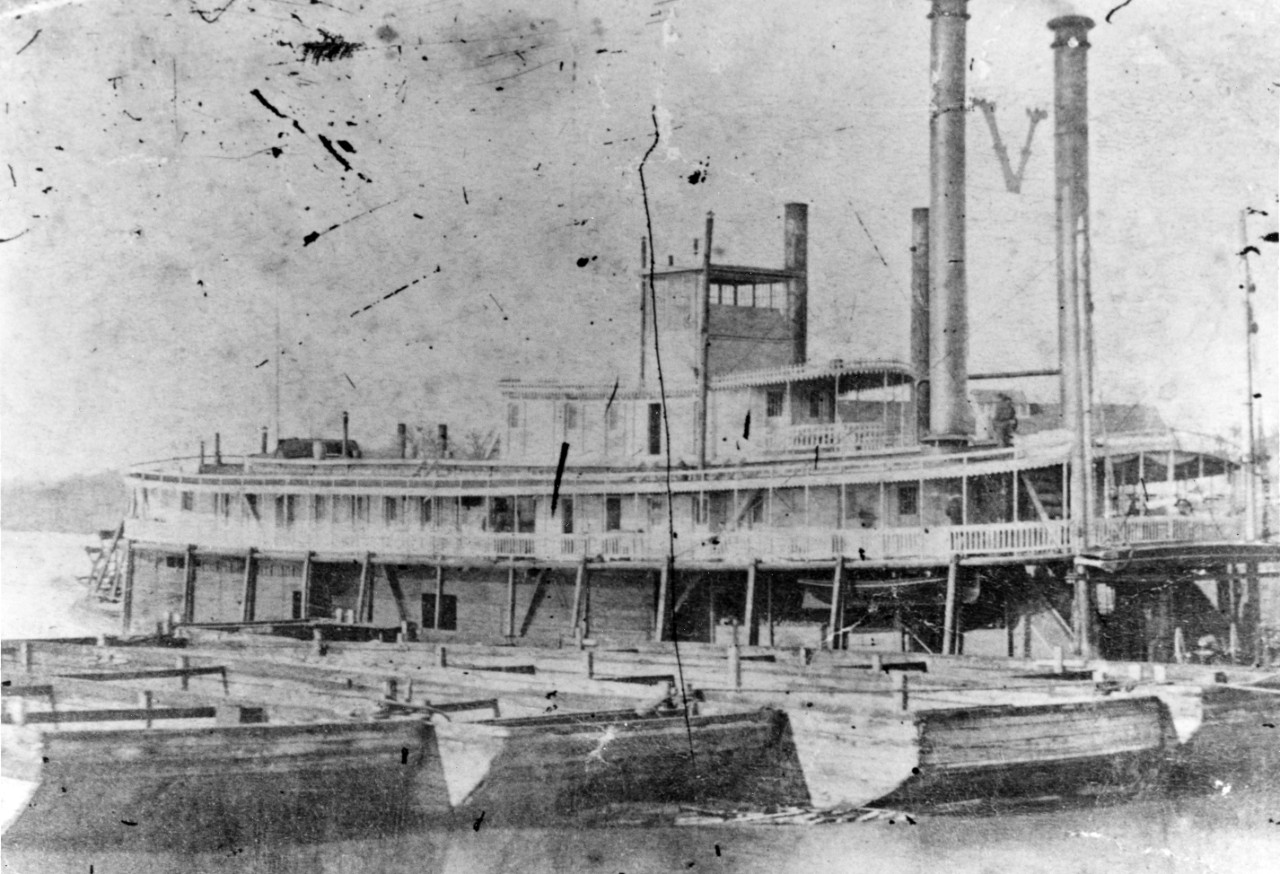
- USS Volunteer anchored of the Western Rivers.

History

United States
- Laid down: date unknown
- Launched: date unknown
- Acquired: 29 February 1864; at Springfield, Illinois
- Commissioned: circa 29 February 1864
- Decommissioned: summer 1865; at Mound City, Illinois
- Stricken: 1865 (est.)
- Captured: by Union Navy forces; 25 November 1863
- Fate: Sold, 29 November 1865

General characteristics
- Displacement: 209 tons
- Length: not known
- Beam: not known
- Draught: 5 ft (1.5 m)
- Propulsion: steam engine; side wheel-propelled
- Speed: 6 MPH
- Complement: not known
- Armament: one heavy 12-pounder smoothbore

The first USS Volunteer was a 209-ton steamer captured by the Union Navy and put to use by the Union during the American Civil War.

Virginia served the Navy in minor roles: as a dispatch boat and tugboat; however, at times, she would also be assigned as a patrolling gunboat.

== Captured by Union Navy forces ==
Volunteer—originally a Confederate steamer captured off Natchez Island, Mississippi, by Fort Hindman on 25 November 1863—was purchased by the Navy from the Springfield, Illinois, prize court on 29 February 1864.

== Civil War Union Navy service ==
Volunteer was assigned to the Mississippi Squadron and performed valuable service as a patrol, dispatch, and tow steamer.

Her one major engagement during the war occurred on 14 April 1864 when she helped to drive off a Confederate force which was attacking Fort Pillow, Tennessee.

== Post-war service ==
After the end of the war in April 1865, Volunteer convoyed naval stores up and down the Mississippi River as Union naval forces in the West deactivated.

== Decommissioning ==
That summer, she was decommissioned and laid up at Mound City, Illinois, and was sold at public auction there to B. F. Goodwin on 29 November.

== See also ==
- Confederate States Navy
- Anaconda Plan
