= Shabbona Trail =

Sports trail of Illinois, United States

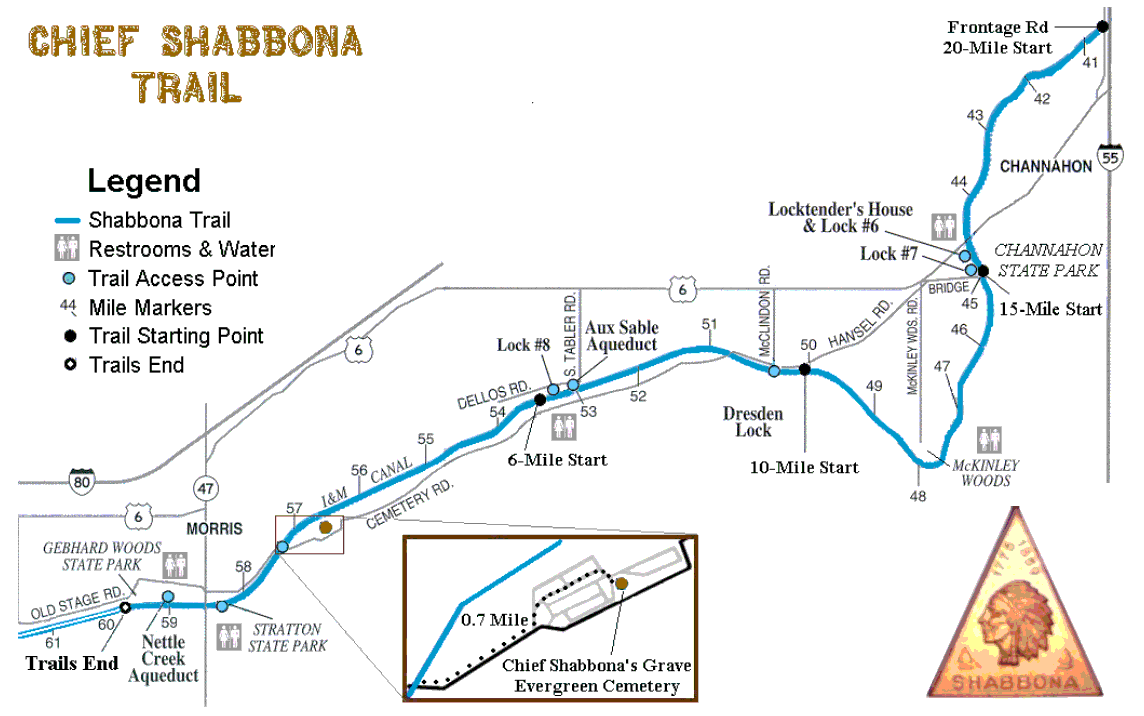
Click here for the trail map

The Chief Shabbona Trail is a hiking, bicycling, and canoeing trail located between Joliet and Morris, Illinois. The Shabbona Trail is a part of the 61-mile (98 km) long National Park Service Illinois and Michigan Canal National Heritage Corridor.

Hiking, bicycling, and canoeing are free. The trail is open year-round.

== Trail length ==
The Shabbona trail extends from frontage road access at Interstate 55 east of Channahon (41°28′5.7″N 88°11′51.4″W) to Gebhard Woods State Park in Morris (41°21′22.8″N 88°26′15.2″W).

The trail offers access points allowing a variety of trail lengths, but the length to earn the official Chief Shabbona Patch is the 15 miles (24 km) from Channahon to Gebhard Woods:

- 1 Mile: Stratton State Park to Gebhard Woods State Park
- 2 Miles: Stratton State Park to Gebhard Woods State Park and back
- 3 Miles: Gebhard Woods State Park to Chief Shabbona grave and back
- 6 Miles: Aux Sable Aqueduct (near Minooka, Illinois) to Gebhard Woods State Park
- 10 Miles: Dresden Lock to Woods State Park
- 12 Miles: Gebhard Woods State Park to Aux Sable Aqueduct and back
- 15 Miles: Channahon State Park to Gebhard Woods State Park -

Can also be canoed

- 20 Miles:

Interstate 55 frontage road access to Gebhard Woods State Park
Gebhard Woods State Park to Dresden Lock and back

== Trail options ==
The Shabbona Trail is compacted gravel and remarkably well protected from traffic and the elements. There is only one point where a rural two-lane road is crossed. The remainder of the trail is a National Park Service Trail, maintained by the State of Illinois. Trees line most of the trail. Much of the trail is near the Illinois River. You can:

- Hike or backpack
- Bicycle
- Canoe or kayak (up to 30 miles (48 km), round-trip)
- Cross-Country Ski

== Camping and boating ==
Camping is available at:

- Channahon State Park
- McKinley Woods (Frederick's Grove in Channahon, IL - Forest Preserve District of Will County)
- Gebhard Woods State Park (30-acre site in Morris, IL)
- Illinois River boating access is available at Stratton State Park

== Grave ==
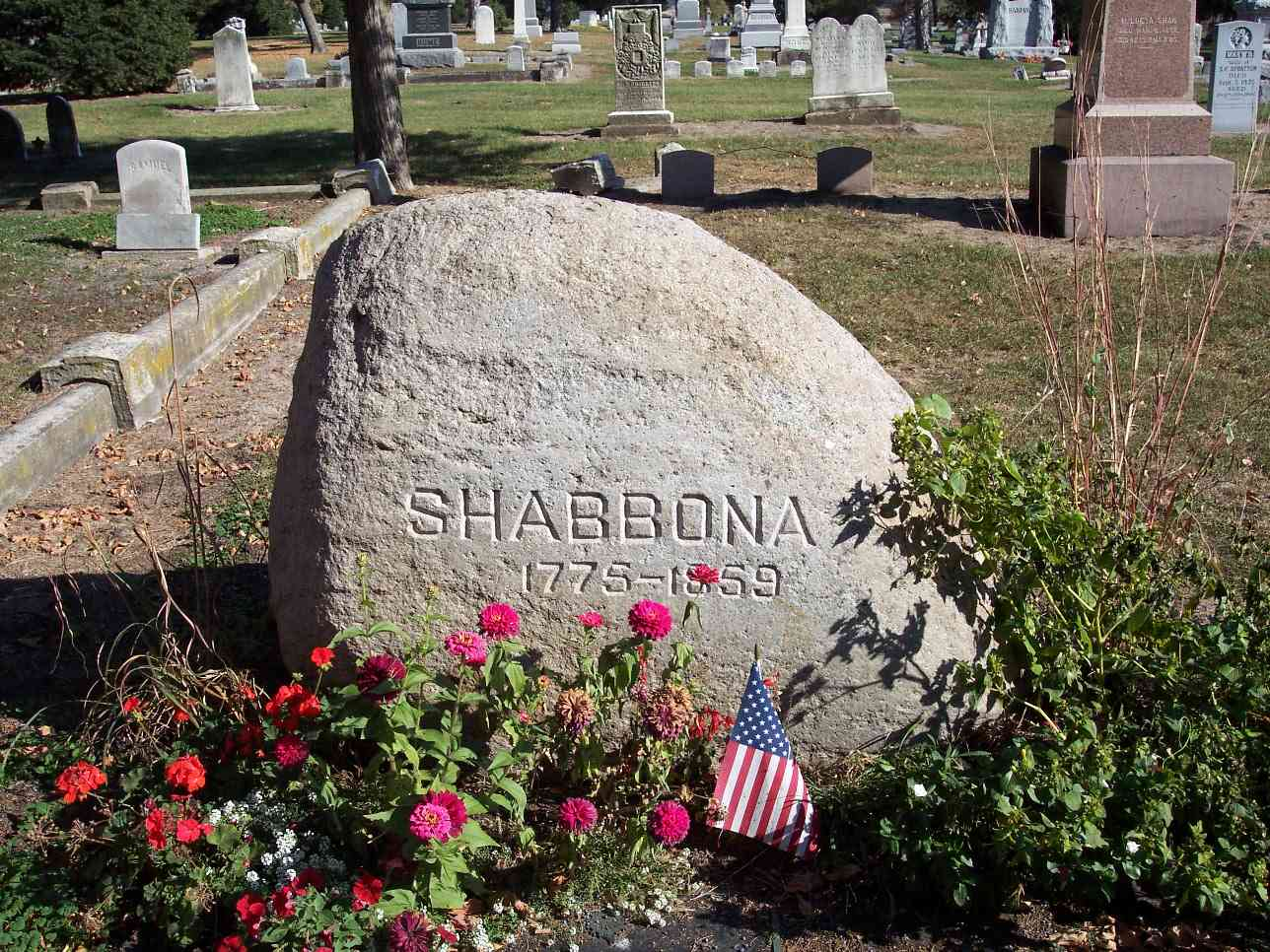

Chief Shabbona's grave is in the center of Evergreen Cemetery in Morris, Illinois. It is marked by a large granite boulder. A brass marker at the base includes this information:

Chief Shabbona
Born 1775
Died 17 July 1859

There is another marker 10 feet (3.0 m) south, showing where other family members are buried.

== History ==
The Chief Shabbona Historical Trail was established on July 30, 1960, by Troop 25. The trail is nationally approved by the Boy Scouts of America and follows the paths that Shabbona was known to have walked. By 1963, over 10,000 scouts hiked the trail. 2010 marks the 50th anniversary of the trail. Along the way, you will see full-size replicas of canal boats, a locktender's house, working stone locks, and fully restored stone aqueducts. These sites date back to when the Illinois and Michigan Canal was built in the mid-19th century.

== Wildlife and vegetation ==
The habitat ranges from open prairie grasslands to dense woods. The nearby Illinois River provides panoramic views in many areas. The trail is shaded in most areas by a variety of trees, including walnut, oak, ash, maple, sycamore, hawthorn, and cottonwood. Springtime wildflowers include trillium, bluebell, white trout lily, violets, wild ginger, phlox, and toothwort. Songbirds, mallards, wood ducks, green herons, and great blue herons feed and nest all along the trail. You can fish for bass, crappie, bluegill, catfish, and bullhead. Beaver, muskrat, mink, raccoon, and deer can often be seen.

== Flier ==
- Chief Shabbona Trail Flier is a printable trail map.

== See also ==
- Cycling in Chicago
- Illinois & Michigan Canal State Trail
