= Towpath =

Path allowing a boat to be towed beside a river

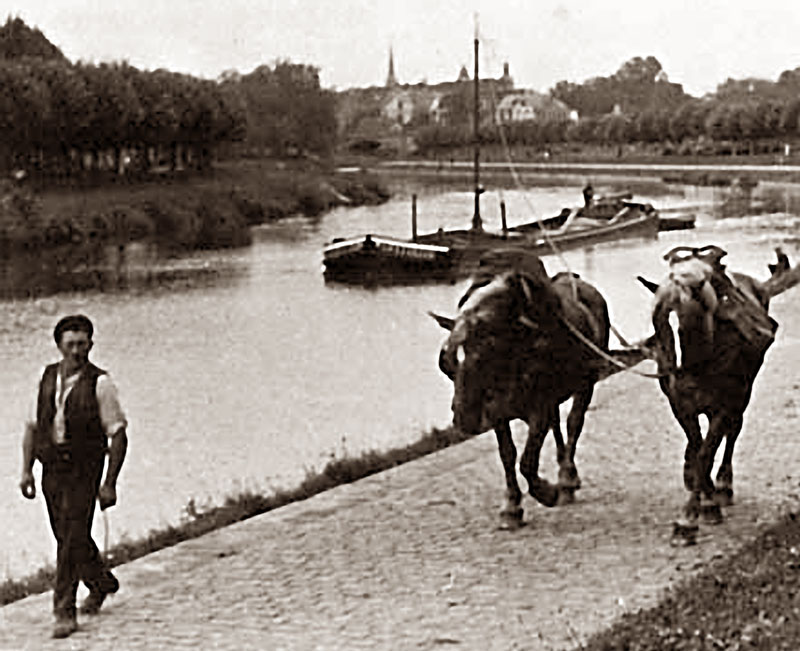
A towpath in use on the Finow Canal in Germany

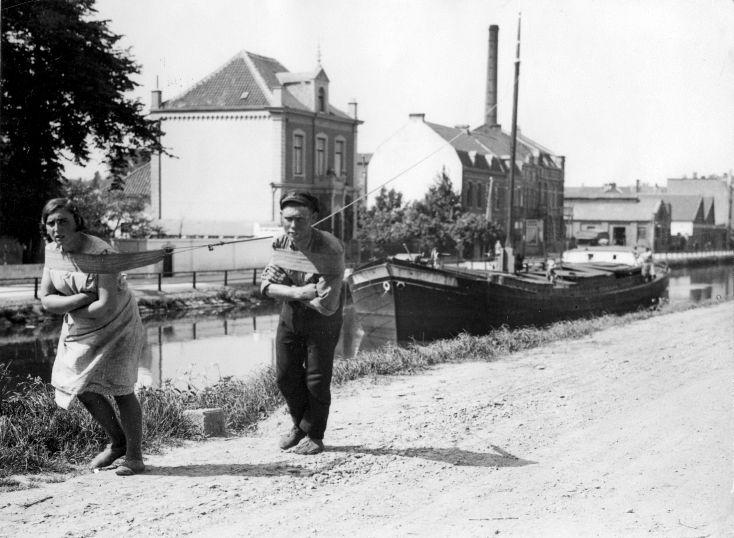
People towing a vessel in the Netherlands in 1931

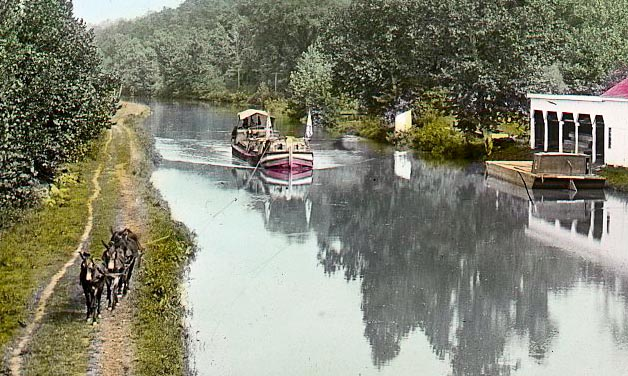
Mules pulling a boat on the Chesapeake and Ohio Canal

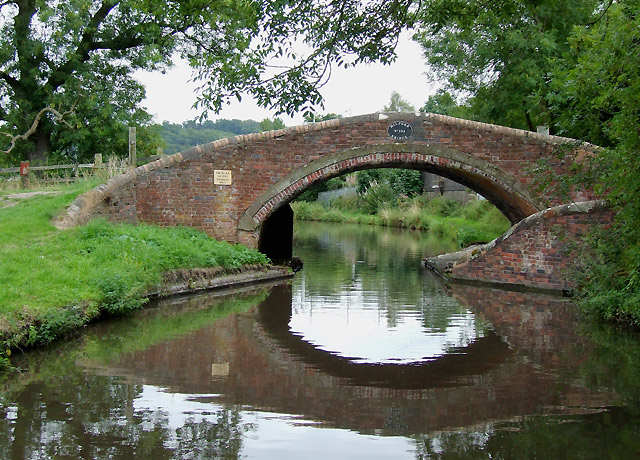
A roving bridge on the English Staffordshire and Worcestershire Canal. The towpath changes to the other side of the canal but the horse does not have to be unhitched.

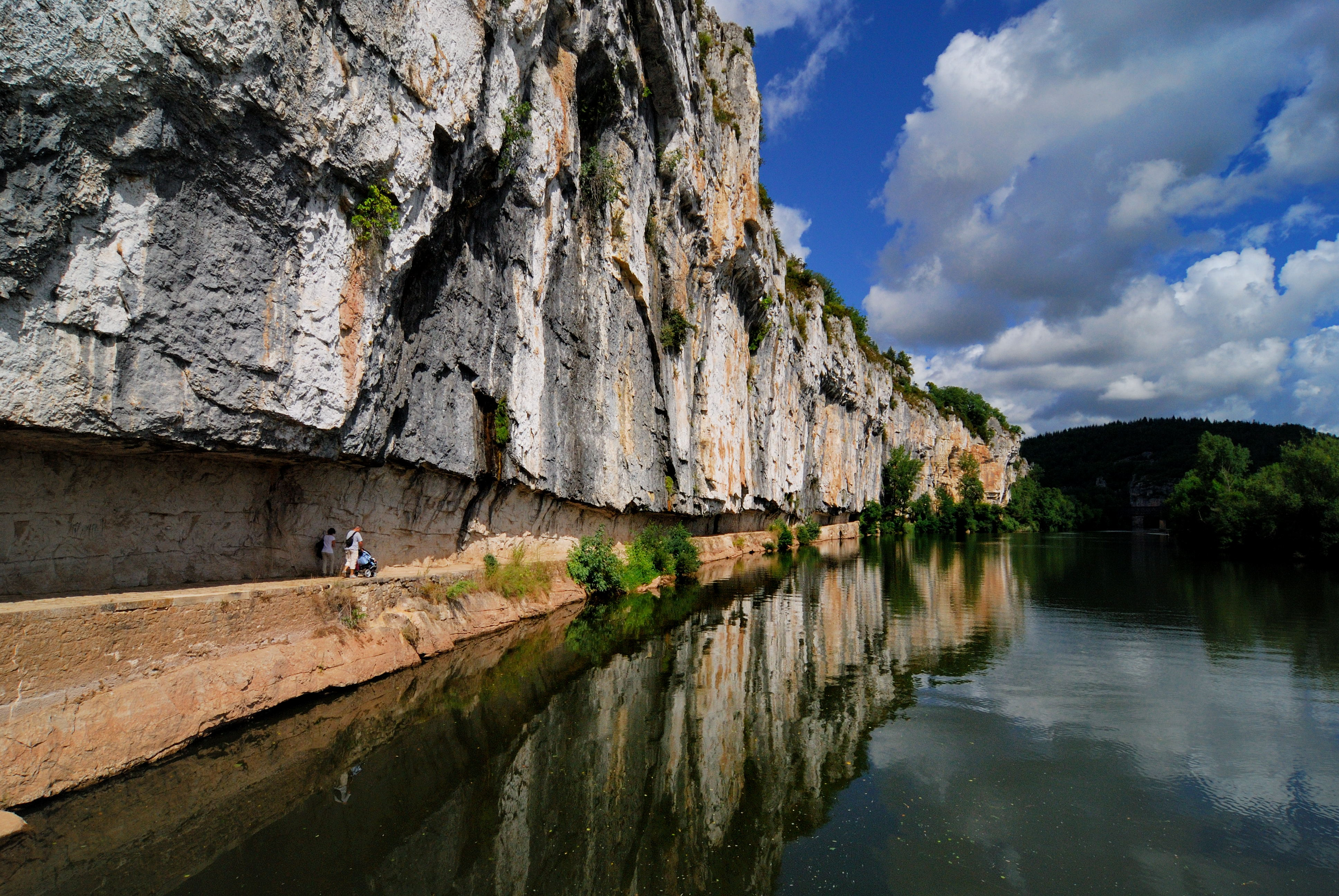
A towpath cut into the rock beside the Lot river in southwest France

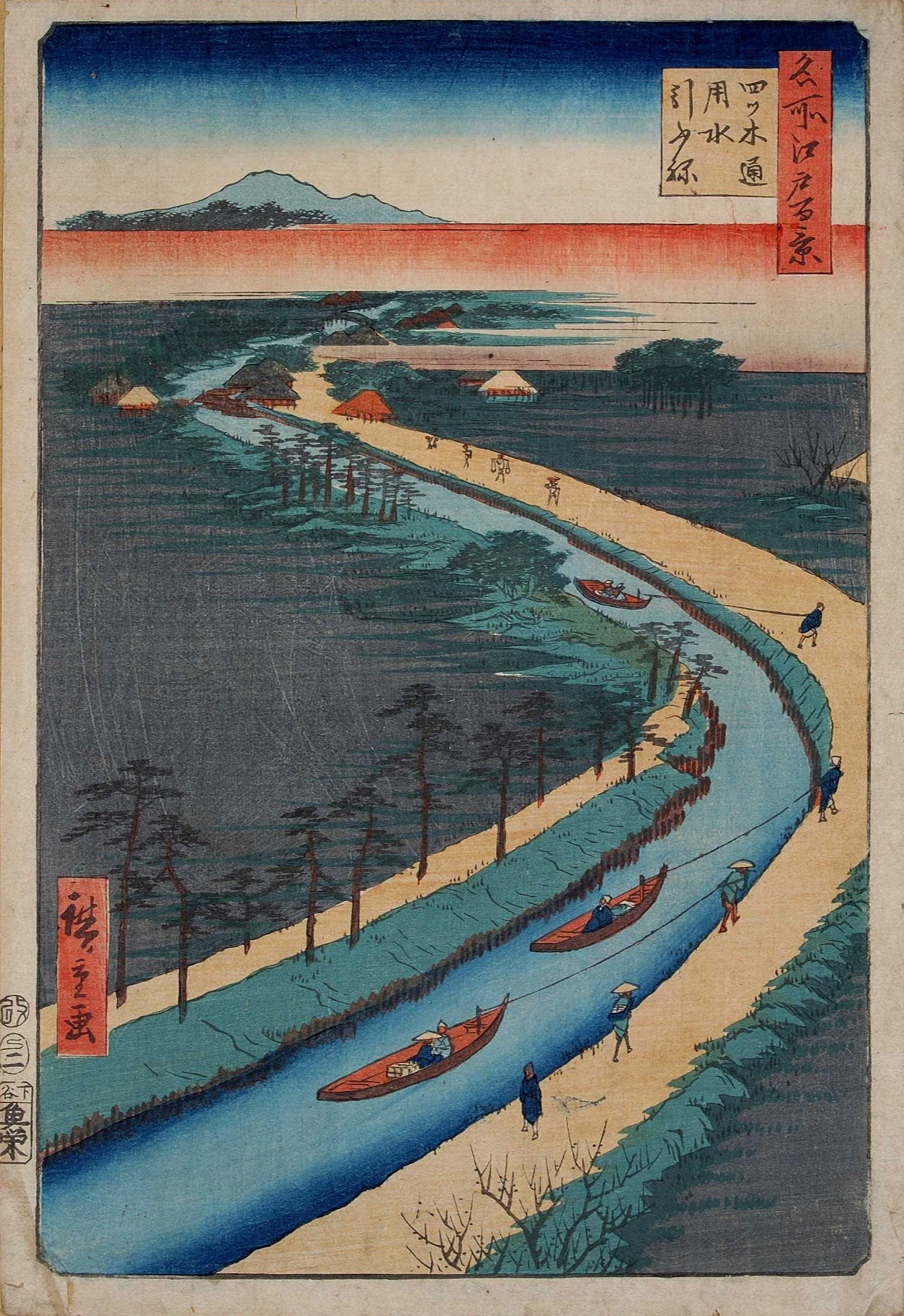
"Towboats Along the Yotsugi-dōri Canal" from Hiroshige's "One Hundred Famous Views of Edo" series, a depiction of a towpath in rural Tokyo, mid-19th century.

A towpath is a road or trail on the bank of a river, canal, or other inland waterway. The purpose of a towpath is to allow a land vehicle, beasts of burden, or a team of human pullers to tow a boat, often a barge. This mode of transport was common where sailing was impractical because of tunnels and bridges, unfavorable winds, or the narrowness of the channel.

After the Industrial Revolution, towing became obsolete when engines were fitted to boats and when railway transportation superseded the slow towing method. Since then, many of these towpaths have been converted to multi-use trails and footpaths. They are still named towpaths — although they are now only occasionally used for the purpose of towing boats.

== History ==
Some early towpaths were built by the Roman Empire and China. In preparation for his invasion of Dacia in 101, Roman emperor Trajan had a towpath cut along the Iron Gates, a gorge on the river Danube. During the reign of Chinese emperor Gaozong of Tang (649–683), towpaths were carved along a dangerous stretch of the Yellow River in an attempt to improve upstream grain transport to Luoyang. There were engineering projects including towpaths at the gorge Sanmenxia on the Yellow River during the Han and Tang dynasties. On the upper Yangtze River, there were early projects in the Tang and Song dynasties, more in the 1300s and 1400s, and even more in the 1700s and 1800s as the population of Sichuan grew and shipbuilding improved. However, towpaths could be quickly destroyed during high-water season due to erosion from agriculture near the river.

Early inland waterway transport used the rivers, and while barges could use sails to assist their passage when winds were favourable or the river was wide enough to allow tacking, in many cases this was not possible, and gangs of men were used to bow-haul the boats. As river banks were often privately owned, such teams worked their way along the river banks as best they could, but this was far from satisfactory. On British rivers such as the River Severn, the situation was improved by the creation of towing path companies in the late 1700s. The companies built towing paths along the banks of the river, and four such companies improved a section of 24 miles (39 km) in this way between Bewdley and Coalbrookdale. They were not universally popular, however, as tolls were charged for their use, to recoup the capital cost, and this was resented on rivers where barge traffic had previously been free.

With the advent of artificial canals, most of them were constructed with towpaths suitable for horses. Many rivers were improved by artificial cuts, and this often gave an opportunity to construct a towing path at the same time. Even so, the River Don Navigation was improved from Tinsley to Rotherham in 1751, but the horse towing path was not completed on this section until 1822. On the River Avon between Stratford-upon-Avon and Tewkesbury, a towpath was never provided, and bow-hauling continued until the 1860s, when steam tugs were introduced.

While towing paths were most convenient when they stayed on one side of a canal, there were occasions where it had to change sides, often because of opposition from landowners. Thus the towpath on the Chesterfield Canal changes to the south bank while it passes through the Osberton Estate, as the Foljambes, who lived in Osberton Hall, did not want boatmen passing too close to their residence. On canals, one solution to the problem of getting the horse to the other side was the roving bridge or turnover bridge, where the horse ascended the ramp on one side, crossed the bridge, descended a circular ramp on the other side of the river but the same side of the bridge, and then passed through the bridge hole to continue on its way. This had the benefit that the rope did not have to be detached while the transfer took place. Where the towpath reached a lock, which was spanned by a footbridge at its tail, the southern section of the Stratford-on-Avon Canal used split bridges so that the horse line did not have to be detached. The rope passed through a small gap at the centre of the bridge between its two halves.

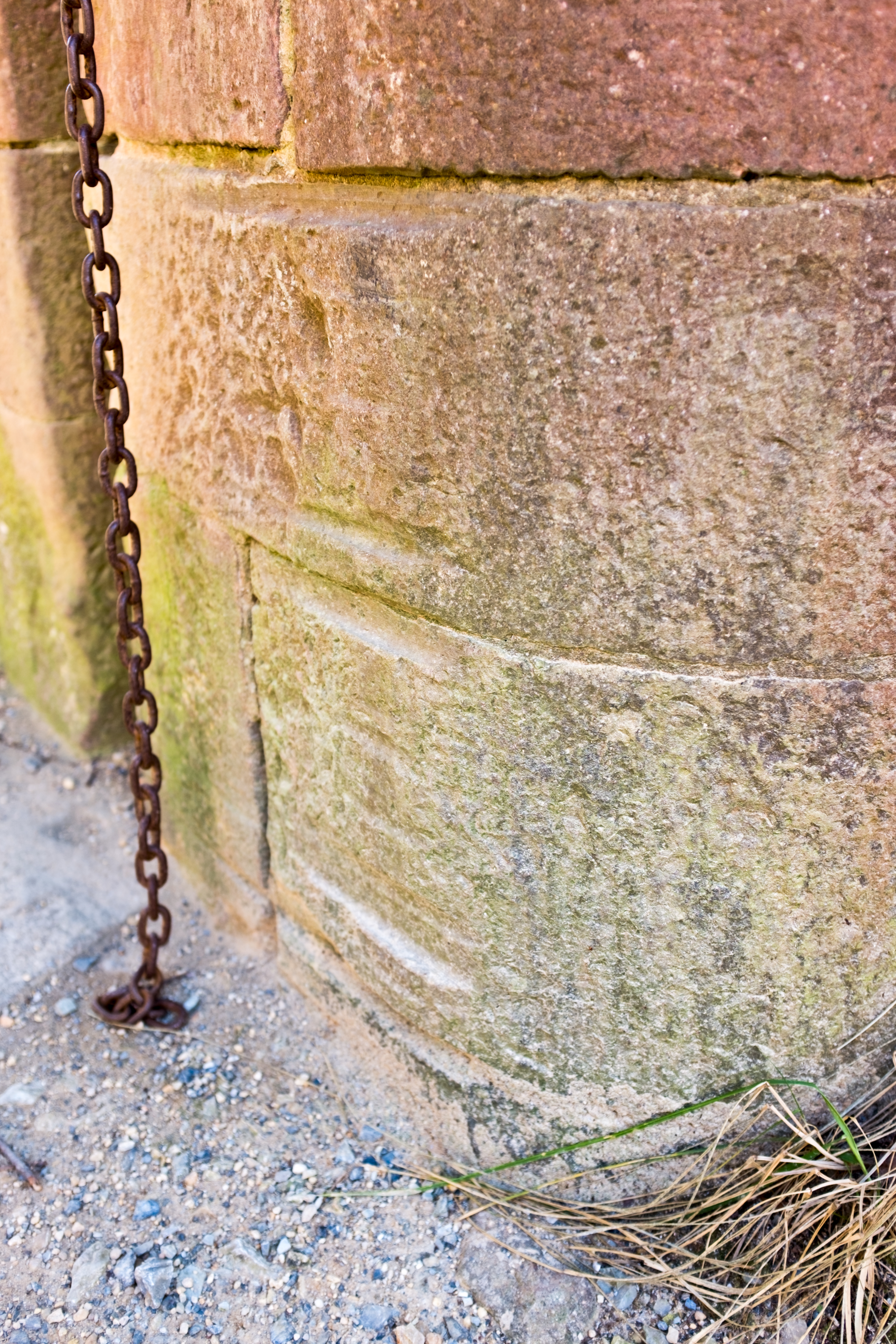
Example of rope abrasion on a bridge (which also functions as a stop gate) over the Chesapeake and Ohio Canal

One problem with the horse towing path where it passed under a bridge was abrasion of the rope on the bridge arch. This resulted in deep grooves being cut in the fabric of the bridge, and in many cases, the structure was protected by cast iron plates, attached to the faces of the arch. These too soon developed deep grooves, but could be more easily replaced than the stonework of the bridge. While bridges could be constructed over relatively narrow canals, they were more costly on wide navigable rivers, and in many cases horse ferries were provided, to enable the horse to reach the next stretch of towpath. In more recent times, this has provided difficulties for walkers, where an attractive river-side walk cannot be followed because the towpath changes sides and the ferry is no more.

Not all haulage was by horses, and an experiment was carried out on the Middlewich Branch of the Shropshire Union Canal in 1888. Following suggestions by Francis W. Webb, the Mechanical Engineer for the London and North Western Railway at Crewe Works, rails were laid along a 1-mile (1.6 km) stretch of the towpath near Worleston, and a small steam locomotive borrowed from Crewe Works was used to tow boats. The locomotive ran on 18 in (457 mm) gauge tracks, and was similar to Pet, which is preserved in the National Railway Museum at York. It pulled trains of two and four boats at 7 mph (11 km/h), and experiments were also tried with eight boats. The canal's engineer, G. R. Webb, produced a report on the expected costs of laying rails along the towpaths, but nothing more was heard of the project, and the advent of steam and diesel powered boats offered a much simpler solution. The 'mules' which assist ships through the locks of the Panama Canal are a modern example of the concept.

== Modern usage ==
Towpaths are popular with cyclists and walkers, and some are suitable for equestrians. In snowy winters they are popular in the US with cross-country skiers and snowmobile users.

Although historically not designed or used as towpaths, acequia ditch banks also are popular recreational trails.

=== Britain ===
In Britain, most canals were built, owned and operated by private companies, and the towpaths were deemed to be private, for the benefit of legitimate users of the canal. The nationalisation of the canal system in 1948 did not result in the towpaths becoming public rights of way. Subsequent legislation, such as the Transport Act 1968, which defined the government's obligations to the maintenance of the inland waterways for which it was now responsible, did not include any commitment to maintain towpaths for use by anyone, however, some ten years later British Waterways started to relax the rule that a permit was required to give access to a towpath, and began to encourage leisure usage by walkers, anglers and in some areas, cyclists. The steady development of the leisure use of the canals and the decline of commercial traffic has resulted in a general acceptance that towpaths are open to everyone, and not just boat users.

The concept of free access to towpaths is now enshrined in the legislation which transferred responsibility for the English and Welsh canals from British Waterways to the Canal & River Trust in 2012. Cycling permits are no longer required by the Canal & River Trust. However, not all canal towpaths are suitable for use by cyclists, and conflicts can arise between the differing user groups, leading to campaigns such as Stay Kind, Slow Down. Parts of some towpaths have been incorporated into the National Cycle Network, and in most cases this has resulted in the surface being improved.

=== China ===
There were many towpaths along the Three Gorges on the Yangtze River. They were accompanied by chains for holding onto and cylindrical rocks for wrapping ropes around. Some were stolen before the construction of the Three Gorges Dam, which submerged the towpaths.

== List of towpaths ==
- Illinois and Michigan Canal
- Chesapeake and Ohio Canal Trail
- Forth to Firth Canal Pathway along route of the Falkirk Wheel.
- D&R Canal Trail
- Thames Path
- Erie Canal
- Augusta Canal
- Ohio and Erie Canal Towpath Trail
- Ohio to Erie Trail
- Central Canal Towpath, Indianapolis, Indiana
- Louisville Loop
- Pennsylvania Canal (Delaware Division)
- Lehigh Canal
- Leeds and Liverpool Canal
- Chambly Canal

== See also ==
- Horse-drawn boat
- Flatboat
- Flyboat
- Narrowboat
- The Volunteer (replica canal boat at LaSalle, Illinois)
- Trekschuit (literally "tugboat") — horse-drawn boat used in the Netherlands
- Burlak — Russian name for a person hauling barges

== Bibliography ==
- Cumberlidge, Jane (2009). Inland Waterways of Great Britain (8th Ed.). Imray Laurie Norie and Wilson. ISBN 978-1-84623-010-3.
- Hadfield, Charles (1972). The Canals of Yorkshire and North East England (Vol 1). David and Charles. ISBN 0-7153-5719-0.
- Hadfield, Charles (1985). The Canals of the West Midlands. David and Charles. ISBN 978-0-7153-8644-6.
- McKnight, Hugh (1981). Shell Book of Inland Waterways. David and Charles. ISBN 978-0-7153-8239-4.
- Roffey, James (1989). The Chesterfield Canal. Barracuda Books. ISBN 0-86023-461-4.
