= USS Volunteer =

USS Volunteer has been the name of more than one United States Navy ship, and may refer to:

- USS Volunteer (1863), a steamer in commission from 1864 to 1865
- USS Volunteer (SP-207), the proposed designation for a motorboat inspected for service in 1918 but never placed in service with the Navy
- USS Volunteer (ID-3242), a collier in commission from 1918 to 1919
