= Gebhard Woods State Park =

State park in Grundy County, Illinois

- IUCN category III (natural monument or feature)
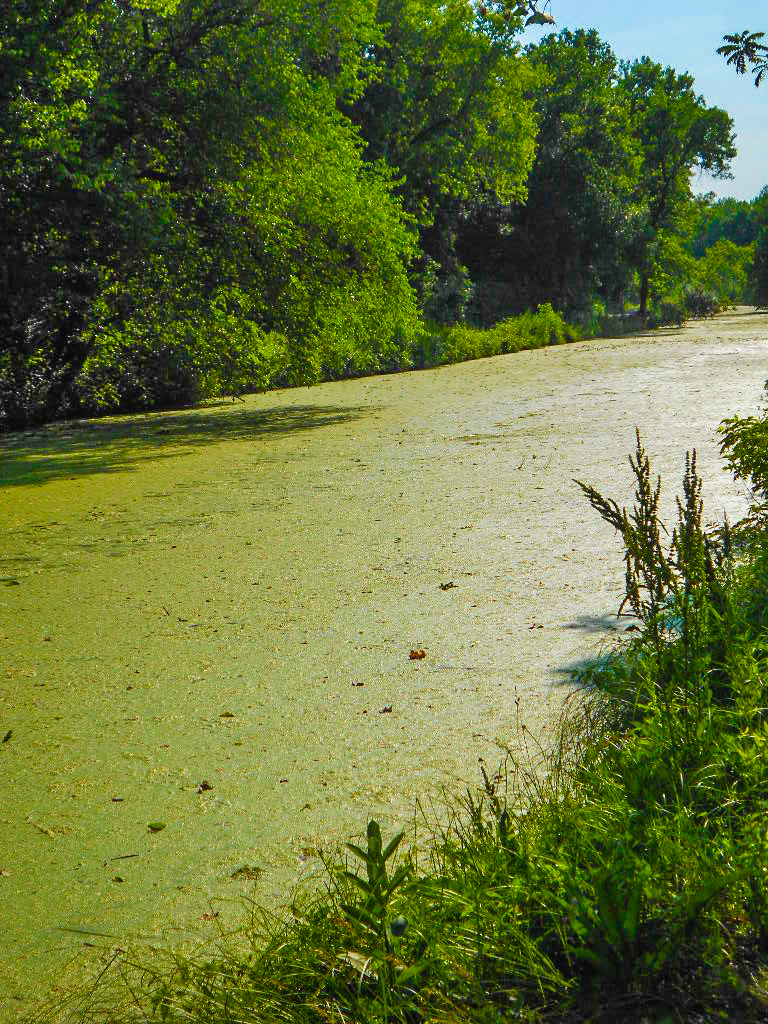
- Gebhard Woods State Park, May 2012

- Location within Illinois Location within the United States
- Location: Grundy County, Illinois, USA
- Nearest city: Morris, Illinois
- Coordinates: 41°21′25″N 88°26′07″W
- Area: 30 acres (12 ha)
- Established: 1934
- Governing body: Illinois Department of Natural Resources

Gebhard Woods State Park is an Illinois state park on 30 acres (12 ha) in Grundy County, Illinois, United States. Originally was owned by Mrs. William Gebhard, but was bought by the Grundy County Rod & Gun Club in 1934. After paying the $1,500.00, the Rod and Gun club donated the land to Illinois to create the Gebhard Woods State Park.

== See also ==
- The Shabbona Trail goes through Channahon State Park and ends in Gebhard Woods State Park.
- Gebhard Woods is located along the 61-mile (98 km) long National Park Service Illinois and Michigan Canal National Heritage Corridor.
