= Illinois and Michigan Canal =

Canal system in Illinois (1848–1933)

- Illinois and Michigan Canal Locks and Towpath
- U.S. National Register of Historic Places
- U.S. National Historic Landmark
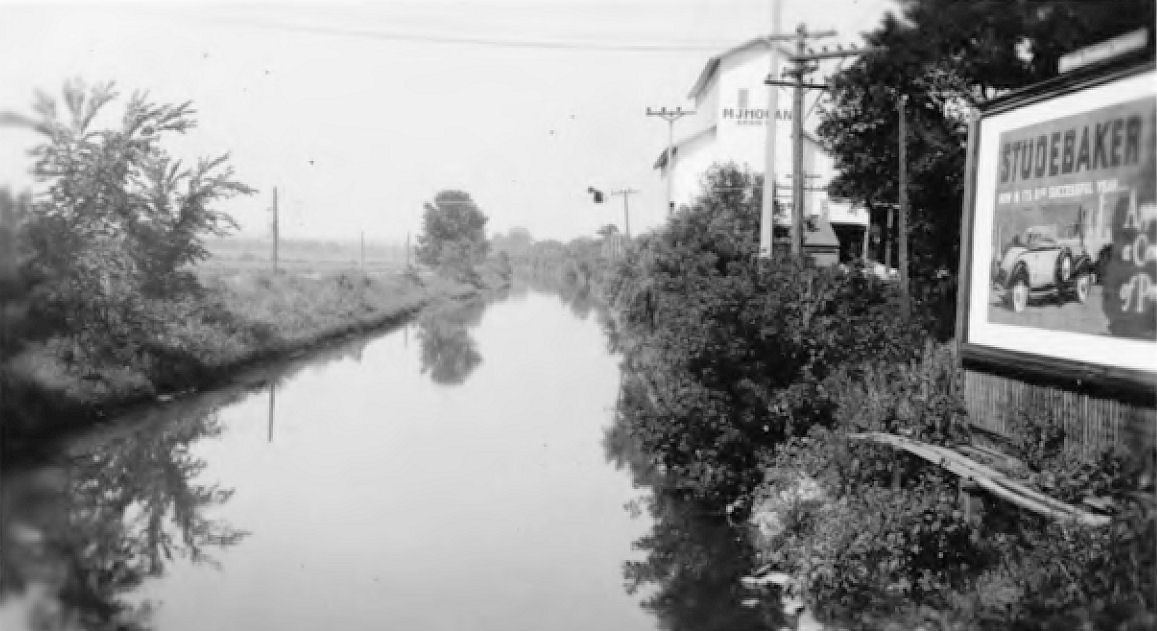
- A scene at Seneca, Illinois

- Location within Illinois Location within the United States
- Nearest city: Joliet, Illinois
- Coordinates: 41°34′11″N 88°4′11″W
- Area: 1,130 acres (4.6 km^{2})
- Built: 1848
- NRHP reference No.: 66000332

Significant dates
- Added to NRHP: October 15, 1966
- Designated NHL: January 29, 1964

The Illinois and Michigan Canal connected the Great Lakes to the Mississippi River. In Illinois, it ran 96 miles (154 km) from the Chicago River in Bridgeport, Chicago, to the Illinois River at LaSalle-Peru. Opened in 1848, the canal crossed the Chicago Portage and helped establish Chicago as the transportation hub of the United States, before the railroad era.

Its function was partially replaced by the wider and deeper Chicago Sanitary and Ship Canal in 1900, and it ceased transportation operations with the completion of the Illinois Waterway in 1933. Portions of the canal have been filled in. Much of the former canal, near the Heritage Corridor transit line, has been preserved as part of the Illinois and Michigan Canal National Heritage Corridor.

Illinois and Michigan Canal Locks and Towpath, a collection of eight engineering structures and segments of the canal between Lockport and LaSalle-Peru, was designated a National Historic Landmark in 1964.

== Significance ==
In the 19th century, canals were an important mode of transportation. The Illinois and Michigan Canal connected the Mississippi Basin to the Great Lakes Basin. The potential canal route influenced Illinois's north border. The Erie Canal and the Illinois and Michigan Canal cemented cultural and trade ties to the Northeast rather than the South. Before the canal, agriculture in the region was limited to subsistence farming. The canal made agriculture in northern Illinois profitable by opening connections to eastern markets.

== History ==
=== Conception ===
The first known Europeans to travel the area, Jacques Marquette and Louis Jolliet, went through the Chicago Portage on their return trip. Jolliet remarked that with a canal they could remove the need to portage and the French could create an empire spanning the continent. The first quantitative survey of the portage was performed in 1816 by Stephen H. Long. It was on the basis of these measurements that he was able to make a specific proposal for a canal.

With several slave states recently admitted to the Union, Nathaniel Pope and Ninian Edwards saw the opportunity to make Illinois a state. They proposed moving the border northward from the southern tip of Lake Michigan to allow the canal to be within a single state. They believed that the canal would firmly align Illinois with the free states, and so Congress granted them statehood even though Illinois did not meet the population requirements.

=== Construction ===
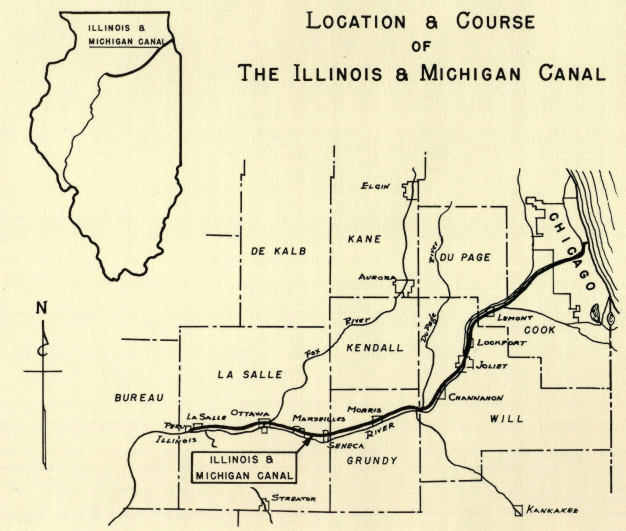
The location and course of the Illinois and Michigan Canal

In 1824, Samuel D. Lockwood, one of the first commissioners of the canal, was given the authorization to hire contractors to survey a route for the canal to follow. Construction began in 1836, although it was stopped for several years with the onset of the Panic of 1837. The Canal Commission had a grant of 284,000 acres (115,000 ha) of federal land which it sold at $1.25 per acre ($310/km^{2}) to finance the construction. Additional funds were borrowed from Eastern United States and British investors.

Most of the work was done by Irish immigrants who previously worked on the Erie Canal. The work was considered dangerous, and many workers died, although no official records exist to indicate how many. The Irish were often derided as a sub-class and were treated very poorly by other citizens of the city.

The canal was finished in 1848 at a cost of $6,170,226. Chicago Mayor James Hutchinson Woodworth presided over the opening ceremony. Pumps were used to draw water to fill the canal near Chicago, which was later supplemented by water from the Calumet Feeder Canal. The DuPage River provided water farther south. In 1871 the canal was deepened to speed up the current and to improve sewage disposal.

=== Completion ===
The canal was eventually 60 feet (18 m) wide and 6 feet (1.8 m) deep, with towpaths constructed along each edge to permit mules to be harnessed to tow barges along the canal. Towns were planned out along the path of the canal spaced at intervals corresponding to the distance that the mules could haul the barges. It had seventeen locks and four aqueducts to cover the 140-foot (43 m) elevation difference between Lake Michigan and the Illinois River. From 1848 to 1852 the canal was a popular passenger route, but passenger service ended in 1853 with the opening of the Chicago, Rock Island and Pacific Railroad that ran parallel to the canal. The canal had its peak shipping year in 1882 and remained in use until 1933.

=== Decline and replacement ===
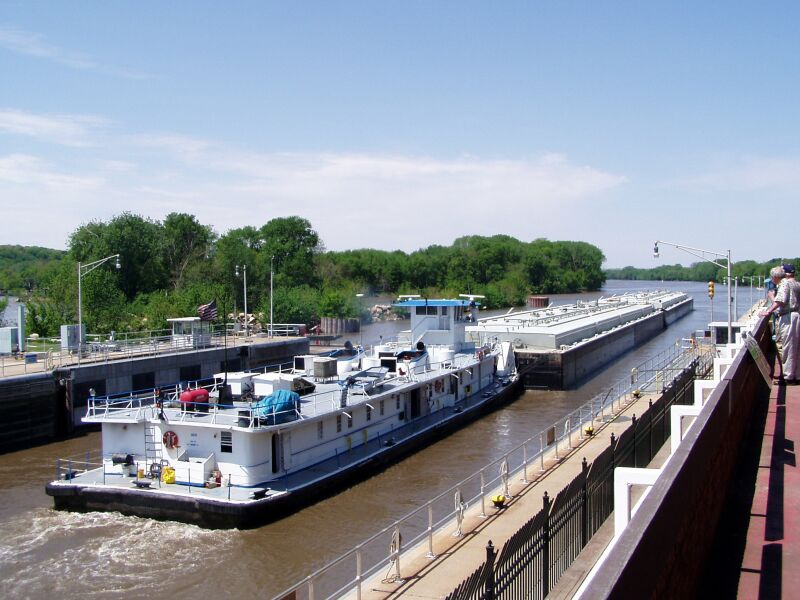
New lock and dam structures that replaced the historic Illinois and Michigan Canal

Following the Great Chicago Fire of 1871, Chicago rebuilt rapidly along the Chicago River. The river was especially important to the development of the city since all wastes from houses, farms, the stockyards, and other industries could be dumped into the river and carried out into Lake Michigan. The lake, however, was also the source of drinking water. During a storm in 1885, the rainfall washed refuse from the river, especially from the highly polluted Bubbly Creek, far out into the lake (the city water intakes are located 2 miles (3.2 km) offshore). Although no epidemics occurred, the Chicago Sanitary District (now The Metropolitan Water Reclamation District) was created by the Illinois legislature in 1889 in response to this close call.

This new agency devised a plan to construct channels and canals to reverse the flow of the rivers away from Lake Michigan and divert the contaminated water downstream where it could be diluted as it flowed into the Des Plaines River and eventually the Mississippi. In 1892, the direction of part of the Chicago River was reversed by the Army Corps of Engineers with the result that the river and much of Chicago's sewage flowed into the canal instead of into Lake Michigan. The complete reversal of the river's flow was accomplished when the Sanitary and Ship Canal was opened in 1900. It was replaced in 1933 by the Illinois Waterway, which remains in use.

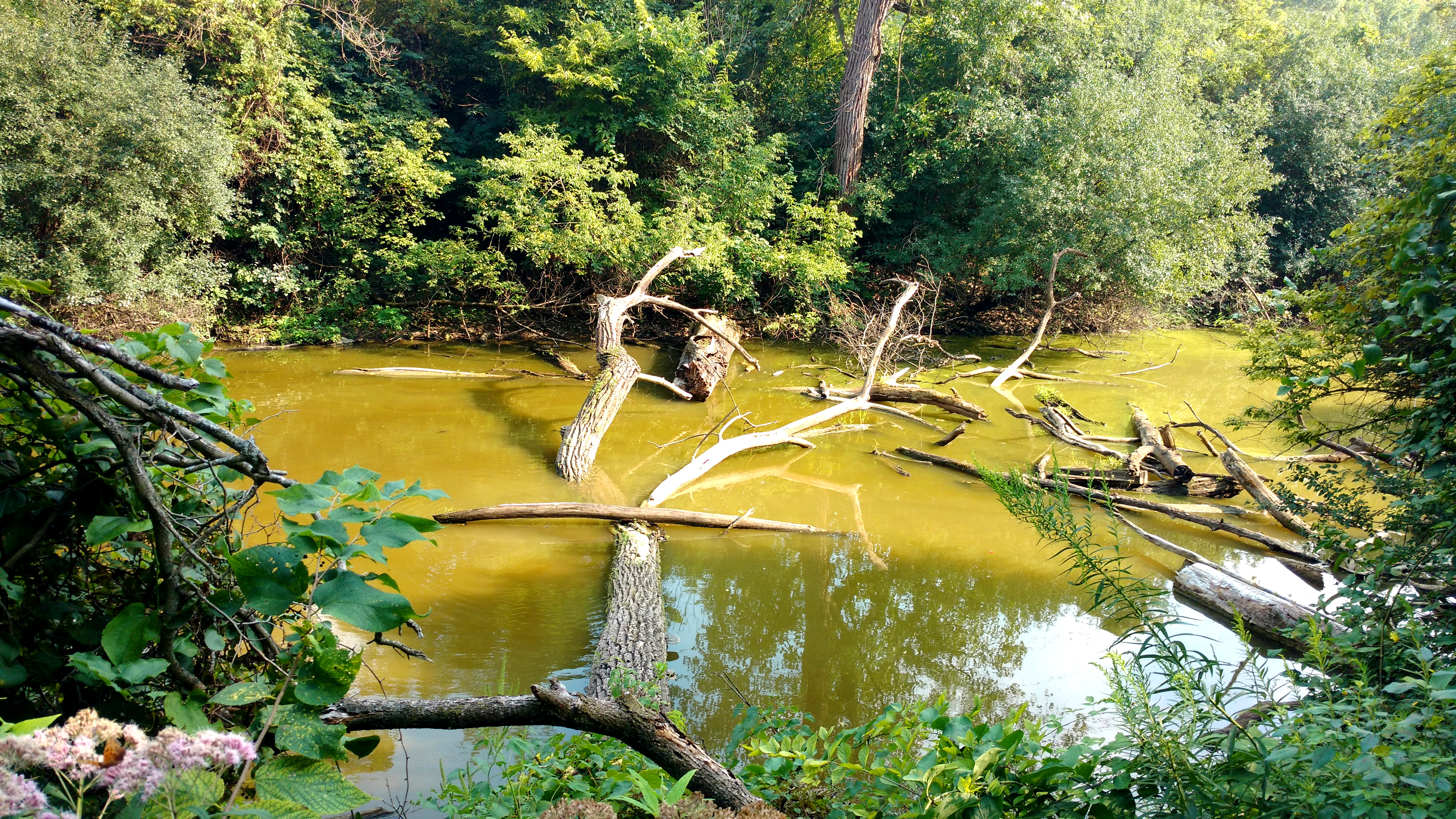
Illinois and Michigan Canal west of Willow Springs, where the unused canal is clogged with fallen trees

=== Rejuvenation ===
The origin site of the Illinois and Michigan Canal has been converted into a nature park that integrates history, ecology and art to communicate the canal's importance in the development of Chicago. In 2003 the Chicago Park District, in cooperation with the I & M Canal Association, hired Conservation Design Forum to develop plans to convert the brownfield site into a landscape that provided for passive recreational uses in a landscape setting with native plant species. Interpretive panels built into a wall along a bike trail were designed by local high school art students. The plans also called on landscape stabilization techniques to repair a significantly degraded shoreline (water levels can fluctuate as much as 5 feet).

Today much of the canal is a linear park with canoeing and a 62.5-mile (100.6 km) hiking and biking trail (constructed on the alignment of the mule tow paths). It also includes museums and historical canal buildings. It was designated the first National Heritage Corridor by US Congress in 1984.

== Adjacent communities ==
Many towns in northern Illinois owe their existence directly to the canal. Lockport, Morris, Ottawa, and LaSalle were platted by the canal commissioners to raise funds for construction. From east to west the towns along the path of the canal include:

- Bridgeport (Chicago neighborhood)
- Summit
- Willow Springs
- Lemont
- Romeoville
- Lockport
- Joliet
- Channahon
- Morris
- Seneca
- Marseilles
- Ottawa
- Utica
- LaSalle
- Peru

== Associated individuals ==
- Ninian Edwards
- Gurdon Saltonstall Hubbard
- Louis Jolliet
- Abraham Lincoln
- Nathaniel Pope
- John T. Stuart
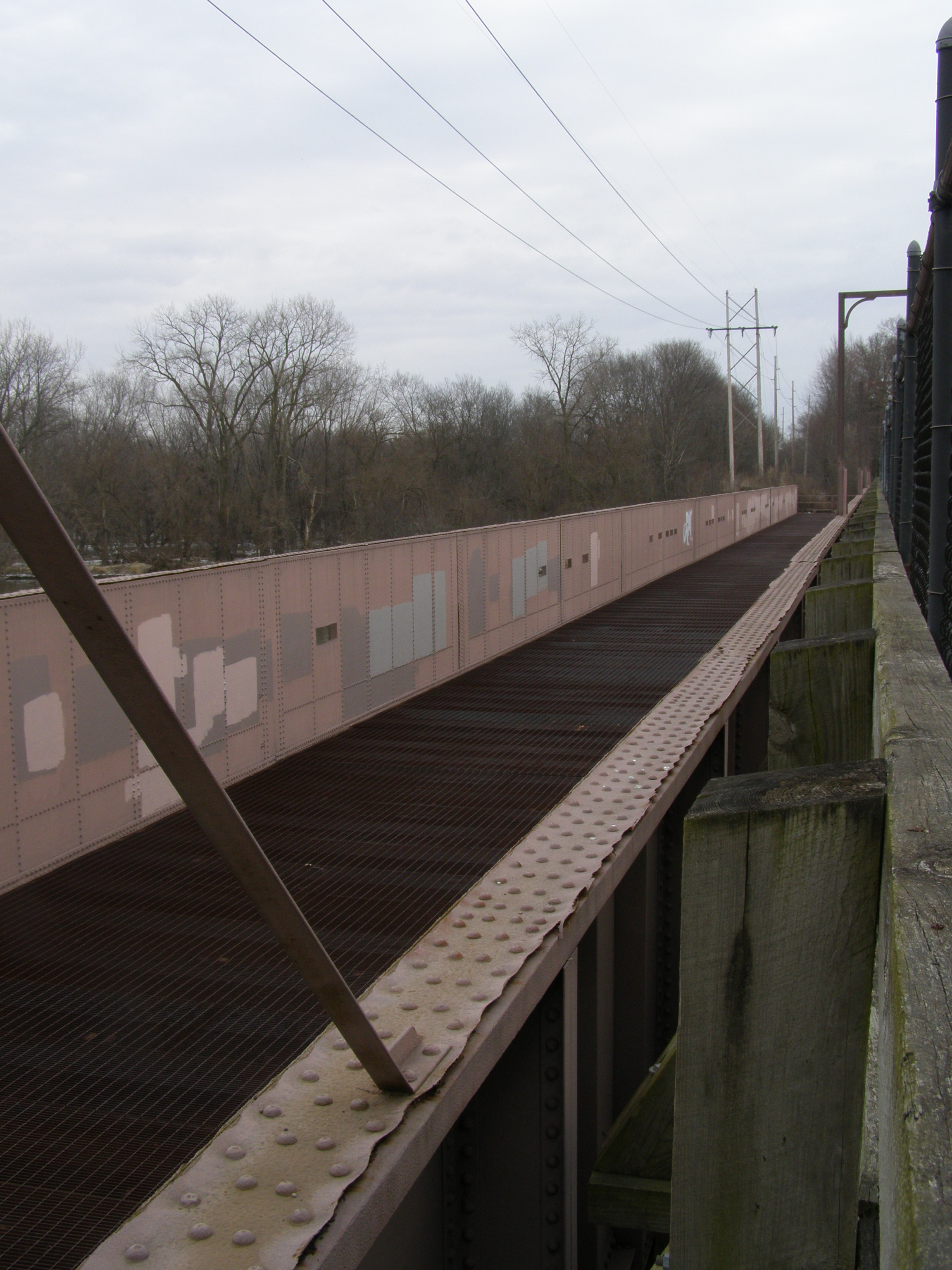
Fox River Aqueduct in Ottawa, Illinois

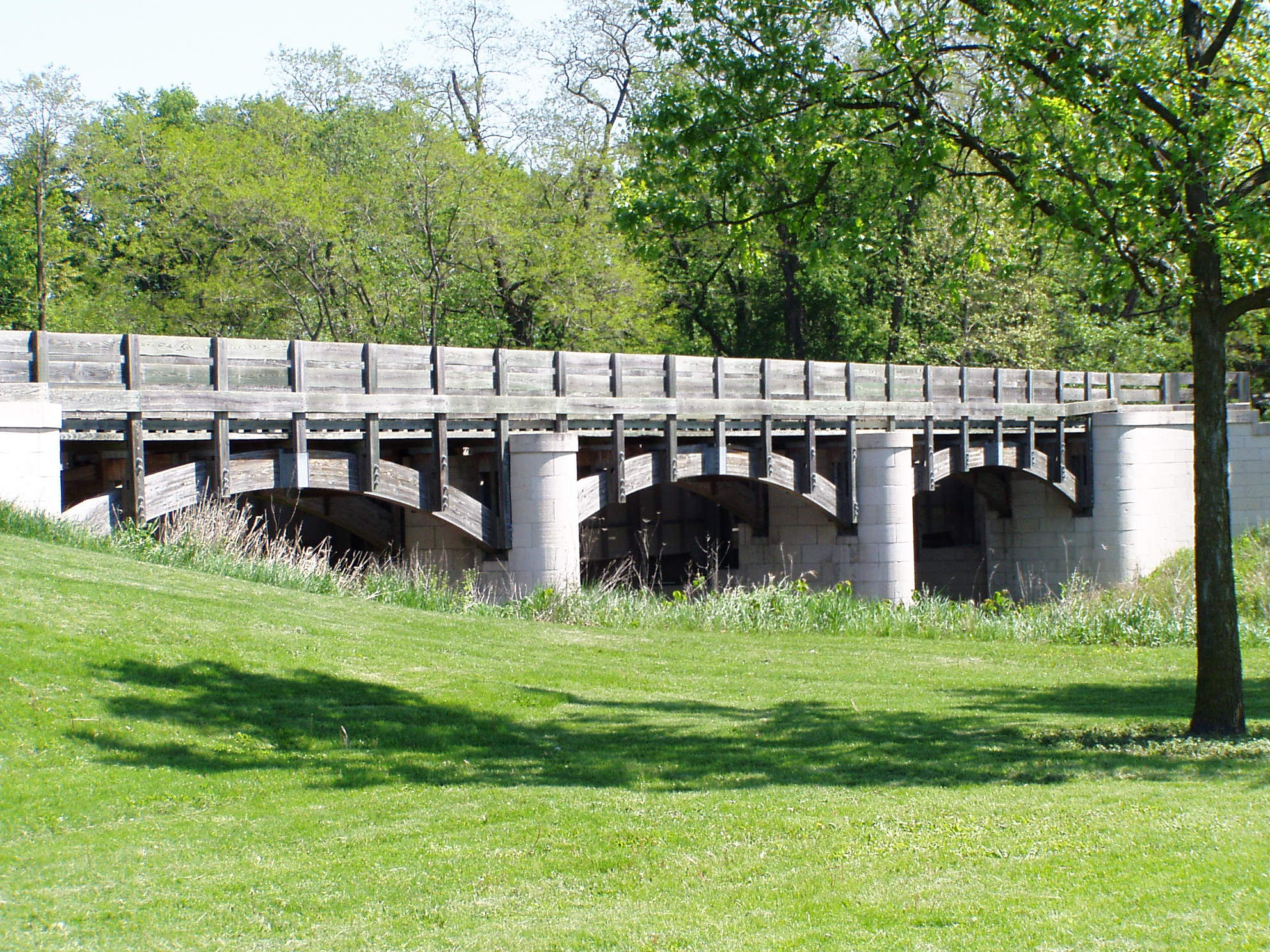
Aux Sable Creek Aqueduct, Morris, Illinois

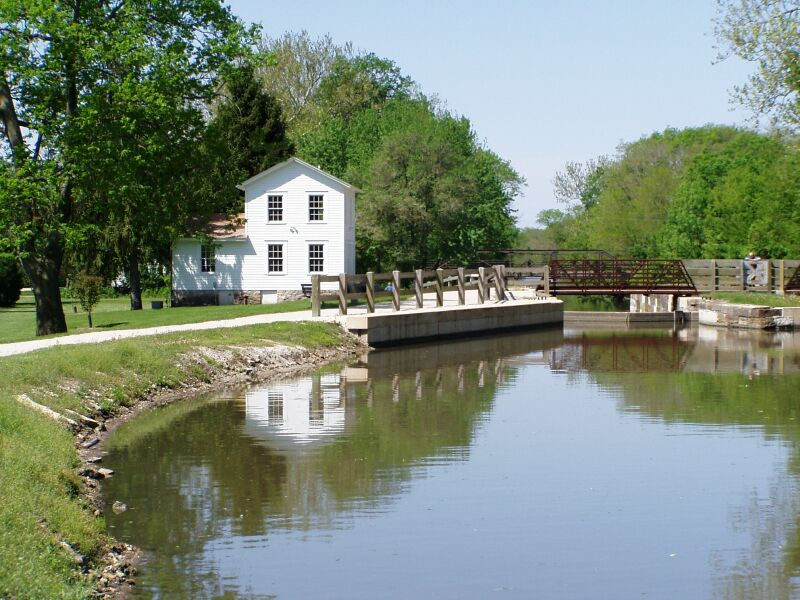
Locktenders House and lock at the Aux Sable Creek

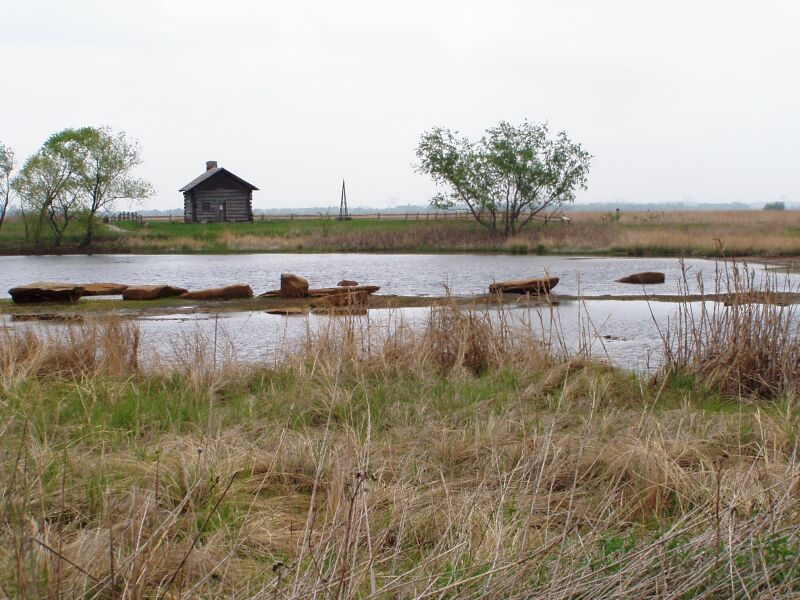
Goose Lake Prairie F&WA, Morris, Illinois

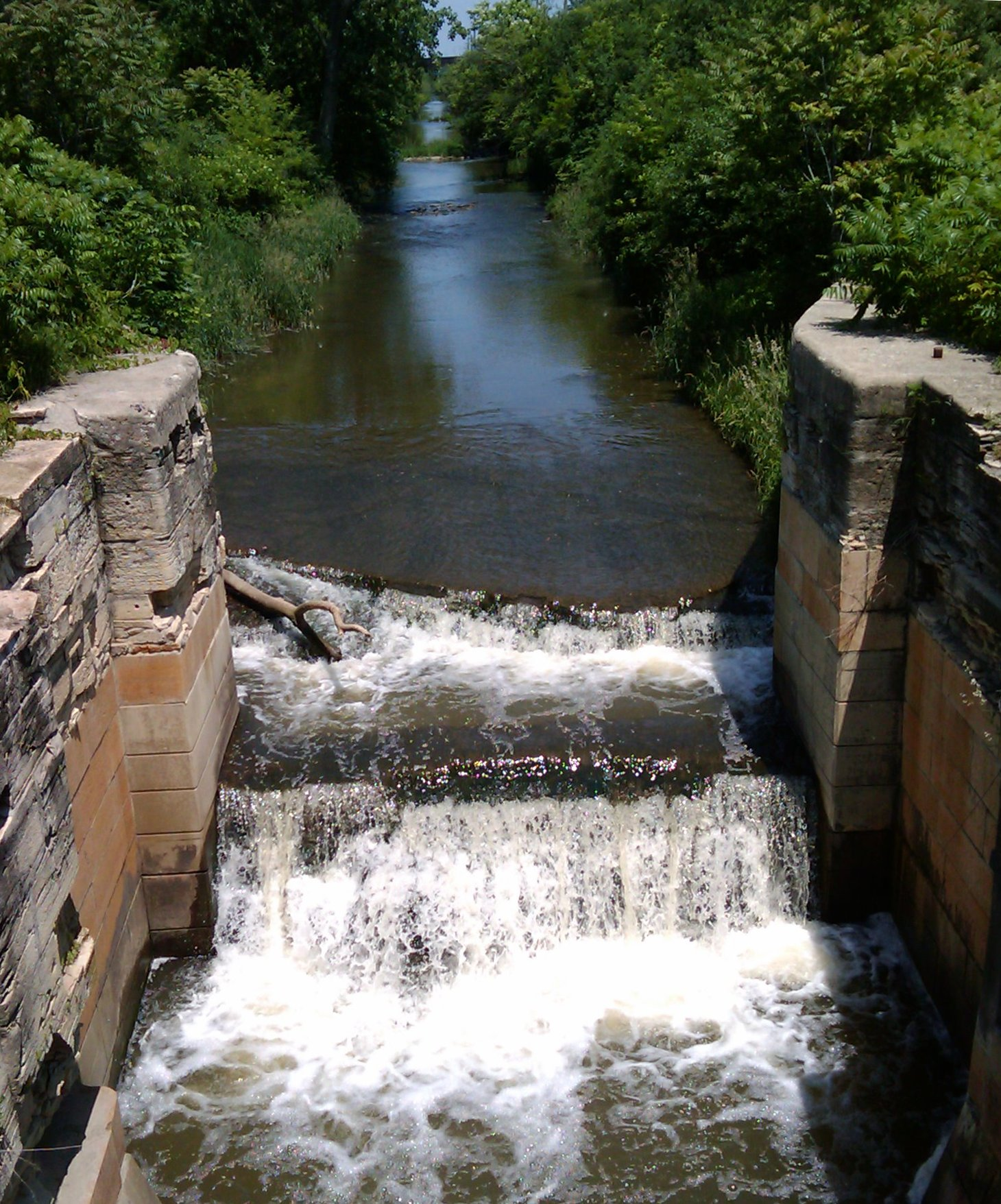
Lock #3, Lockport, Illinois

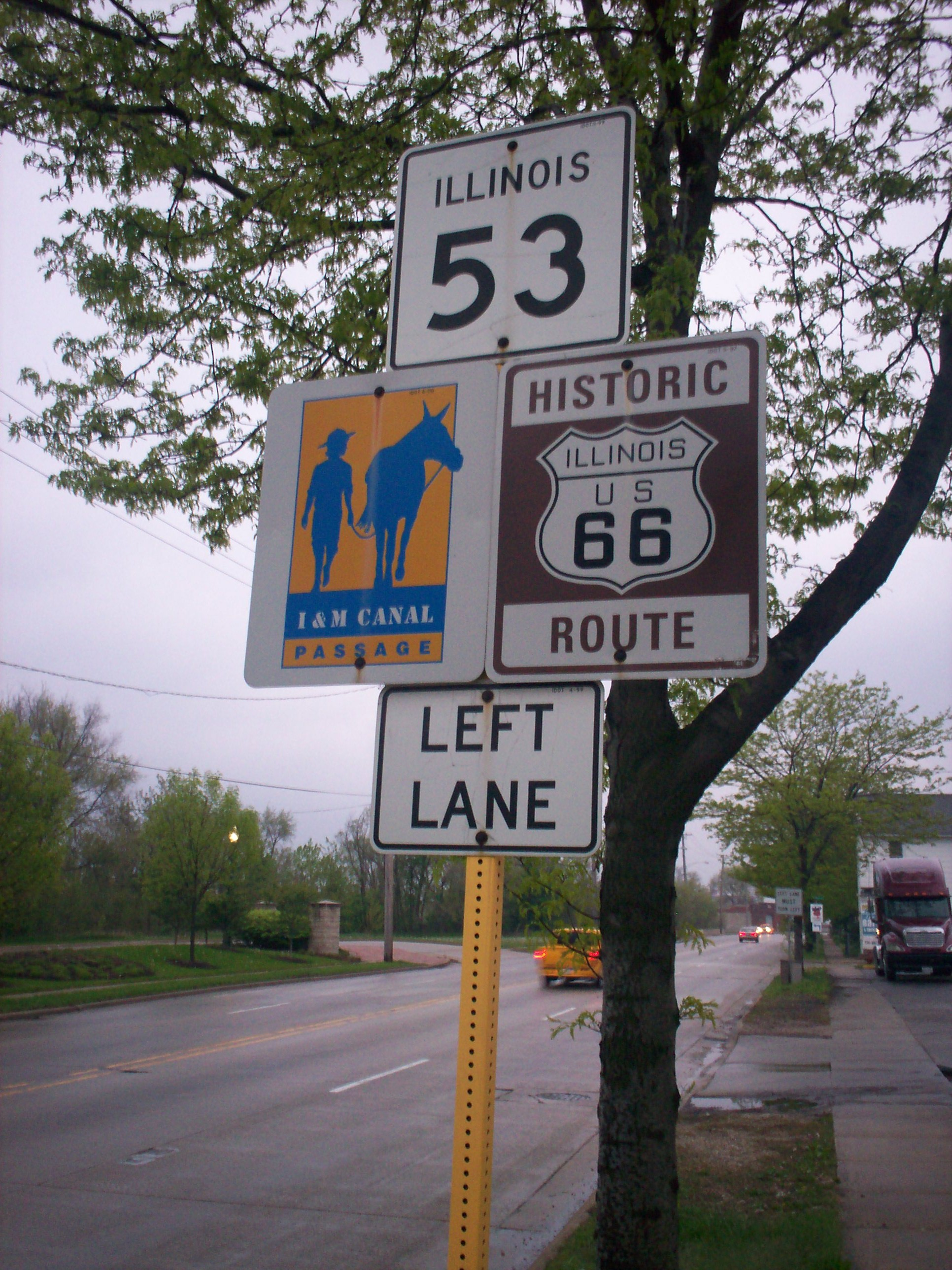
Historic Route 66, Illinois Route 53, and I&M Canal overlap in Joliet, Illinois

== See also ==
- Channahon State Park
- Gebhard Woods State Park
- Matthew Laflin
- David Leavitt (banker)
- List of National Historic Landmarks in Illinois
- Shabbona Trail includes 20 miles (32 km) of the Illinois and Michigan Canal Trail
- Treaty of St. Louis (1816)
- The Volunteer (canal boat)
- Illinois & Michigan Canal State Trail
- 6th ward, Chicago
