= Channahon State Park =

State park in Will County, Illinois, US

- IUCN category III (natural monument or feature)
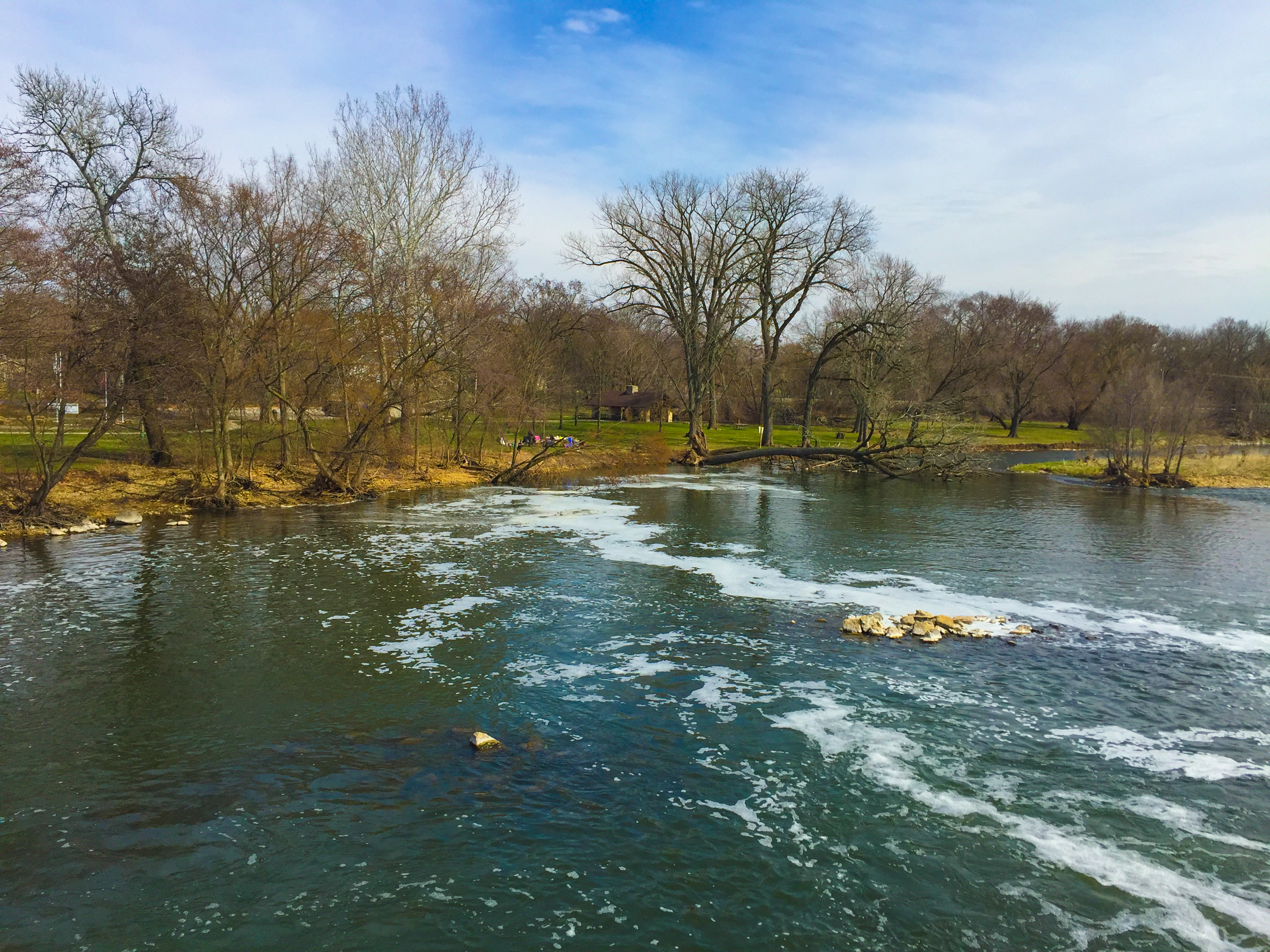
- Channahon State Park, April 2018

- Location within Illinois Location within the United States
- Location: Will County, Illinois, US
- Nearest city: Channahon, Illinois
- Coordinates: 41°25′27″N 88°13′39″W
- Area: 20.5 acres (8.3 ha)
- Established: 1932
- Governing body: Illinois Department of Natural Resources

Channahon State Park is an Illinois state park in Will County, Illinois, United States. The park was named after a Native American word meaning "the meeting of the waters" It lies adjacent to the confluence of the Dupage, Des Plaines, and Kankakee Rivers.

The park is near the municipality of Channahon, Illinois. It is served by U.S. Highway 6.

== See also ==
- The Shabbona Trail goes through Channahon State Park and ends in Gebhard Woods State Park.
- Gebhard Woods is located along the 61-mile (98 km) long National Park Service Illinois and Michigan Canal National Heritage Corridor.

Near Channahon, at the junction of the DesPlaines and Kankakee Rivers, lies one of the most important archaeological sites in America. This Native American site was excavated by George Langford, research associate in the Dept. of Anthropology of the University of Chicago. During his time in the 1930s this site was known popularly as the "Fisher site" or "Fisher Group", and consisted of nine mounds and fifty conical pits once used as a camp site.

The mound ranged in size from average 30 feet in diameter to as much as 60 feet in diameter while the pits were 30 feet in diameter and 3 feet deep. The two largest mounds are of the most significant importance of all the finds made in Illinois. These show periods of regular building and rebuilding. The primary mound was constructed and bodies were buried in it. These were buried together with characteristic utensils. For years the mound would stand undisturbed and grass and weeds built up humus layers on it and then other tribes would come in with different cultures and different tools where they buried their dead. This went on successively so that when the mound was sliced down the middle the layers of strata separated the ages all the way back to 2000 years before the Hopewell arrived. These finds were made well below ground level of the original mound. In general the people of the lowest level had 'long heads' than the round skulls found above them. While these are not the 'cone head' but longer type of skull more akin to a 'Pharaoh skull' shape out the back they are significantly different in type and height to the later tribes arriving to occupy the same area. Tools were scarcely seen in the older dig sites. We have cultural stratification made evident first by the dark humus layers then by distinctive material cultures, methods of burial and difference in physical type all in the same dig site. By comparing the camp site to the different levels in the mounds, the relative age of each was established. Similar sites like that of Joliet and Oakwoods furthered that dating but none compared historically to the findings of Channahon, Illinois, and the Fisher Site. This history complete from the University of Illinois and the U of Chicago is all documented in the Illinois State Blue Book of 1931–2. The cultural sequences established from this dig make the Fisher group one of the most important sites excavated in both the State of Illinois and the US ever discovered as few digs were allowed after these were finished. It is also significant that this find in Channahon, Il proves an apparent change in the head form between the lowest burials than those above. Whatever group lived here in the last ice age was of significantly different type than the modern day occupants.
