= Calumet Feeder Canal =

Canal in Illinois, United States

Coordinates: 41°40′5″N 87°45′41″W

The Calumet Feeder Canal was a short canal in Illinois, operated during the mid-19th century. It connected the Little Calumet River to the Illinois and Michigan (I&M) Canal, and ran from Blue Island, where the Little Calumet made a hairpin turn toward Lake Michigan, to meet the I&M canal at Sag Bridge. The canal was completed in 1849, and covered 16.75 miles (26.96 km). It was one of four feeder canals built for the I&M, the others being the Du Page Feeder, Fox River Feeder and Kankakee Feeder.

The canal was surveyed in 1845; construction began in 1848, and was completed late in the winter of 1848–1849. It began to operate in 1849. The Calumet Feeder was constructed principally to provide additional water so that the I&M canal could maintain a navigable depth, but it also carried commercial traffic of its own. The construction of the canal brought significant economic development to Blue Island.

As built, the canal was 40 feet (12 m) wide at the surface, 26 feet (7.9 m) wide at the base, and 4 feet (1.2 m) deep, with 3 feet (0.91 m) of freeboard. To avoid flooding from the Little Calumet, a control lock was installed on the dam at Blue Island.

After the city of Chicago began to operate steam engines at the Bridgeport pumping station in 1859, the canal was no longer regularly used as a water supply for the I&M. The canal became extremely controversial in Indiana, because of the large dam that had been constructed in order to accumulate sufficient water in the Little Calumet to supply the canal. The water from the dam backed up into Indiana and reduced the value of farmland there. In 1874, when the canal was no longer needed, Illinois breached the dam at Indiana's request. The order for the removal of the dam was issued on April 9, 1874. From that point the feeder ceased entirely to function as a water source for the I&M.

The construction of the deeper Calumet Sag Channel in the 1910s drained the remaining water out of the Calumet Feeder. Today very little remains of the canal, apart from some fragments of the original dam near Blue Island.

== Works cited ==
- Howe, Walter A. (1956). Documentary History of the Illinois and Michigan Canal. Illinois Department of Public Works and Buildings.
