= The Volunteer (canal boat) =

Coordinates: 41°19′35.4″N 89°5′39″W

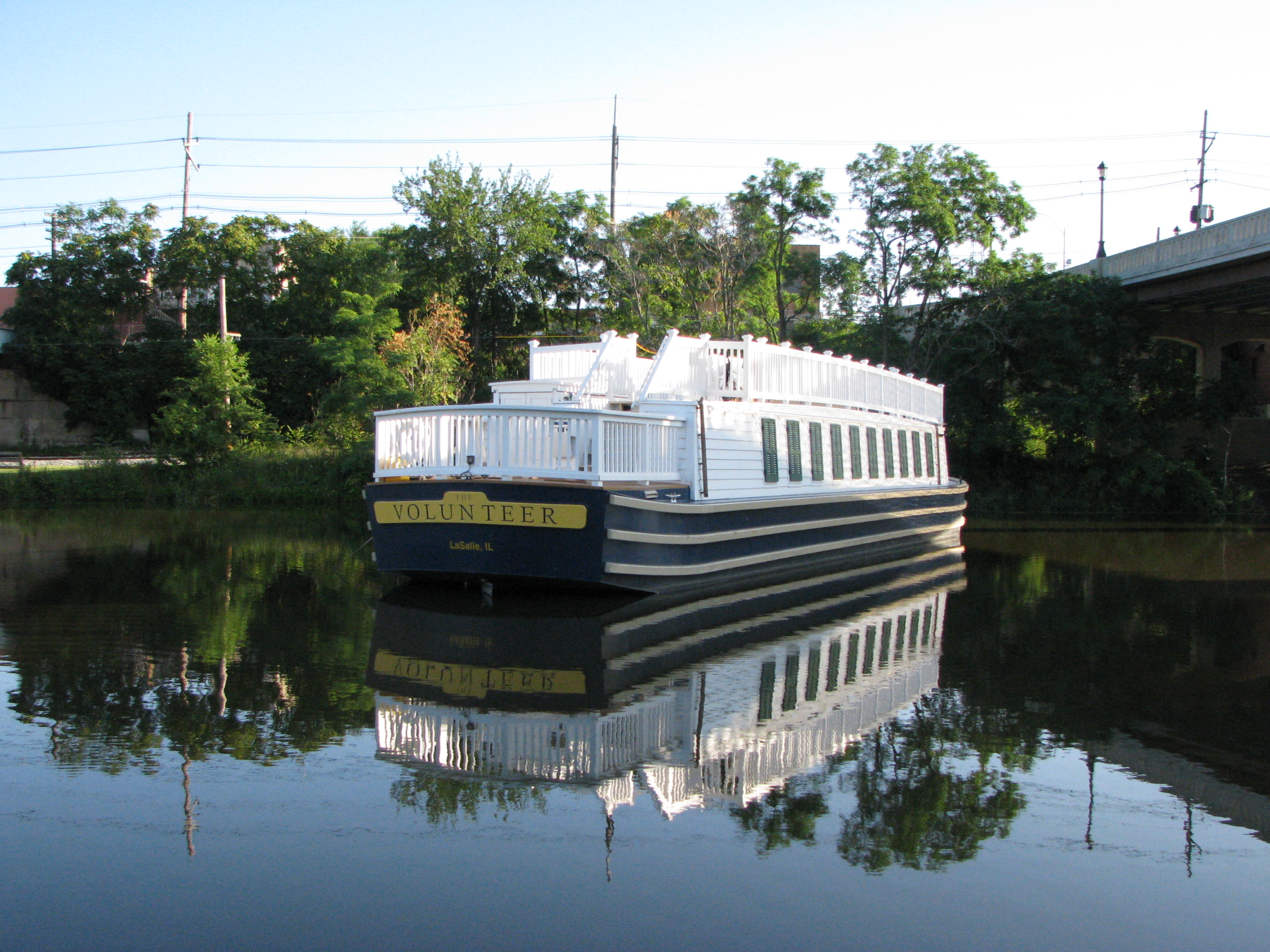
- The Volunteer moored on the Illinois and Michigan Canal at LaSalle, Illinois

History
- Name: The Volunteer
- Owner: Canal Corridor Association
- Port of registry: LaSalle, Illinois, United States
- Builder: Scarano Boat Builders, Albany, New York
- Cost: $993,840
- Yard number: CCA4108
- Completed: 2008
- Identification: VIN: 1212447

General characteristics
- Type: Passenger canal boat
- Tonnage: 57 GT
- Length: 76.3 ft (23.3 m)
- Beam: 15.5 ft (4.7 m)
- Draft: 5.8 ft (1.8 m)

The Volunteer is a 76-foot (23 m) replica of a 19th-century canal boat which is owned and operated by the Canal Corridor Association. The Volunteer operates on a restored section of the Illinois and Michigan Canal at LaSalle, Illinois, United States.

== Construction ==
The boat was built in Albany, New York, by Scarano Boat Builders at a cost of $993,840. The Volunteer was designed to resemble an original canal boat; however, the hull of The Volunteer is constructed out of aluminum and the upper portion is built of rot resistant white cedar. The use of these non-traditional materials was intended to help make the boat easy to maintain and increase the vessel's life.

== The boat ride ==
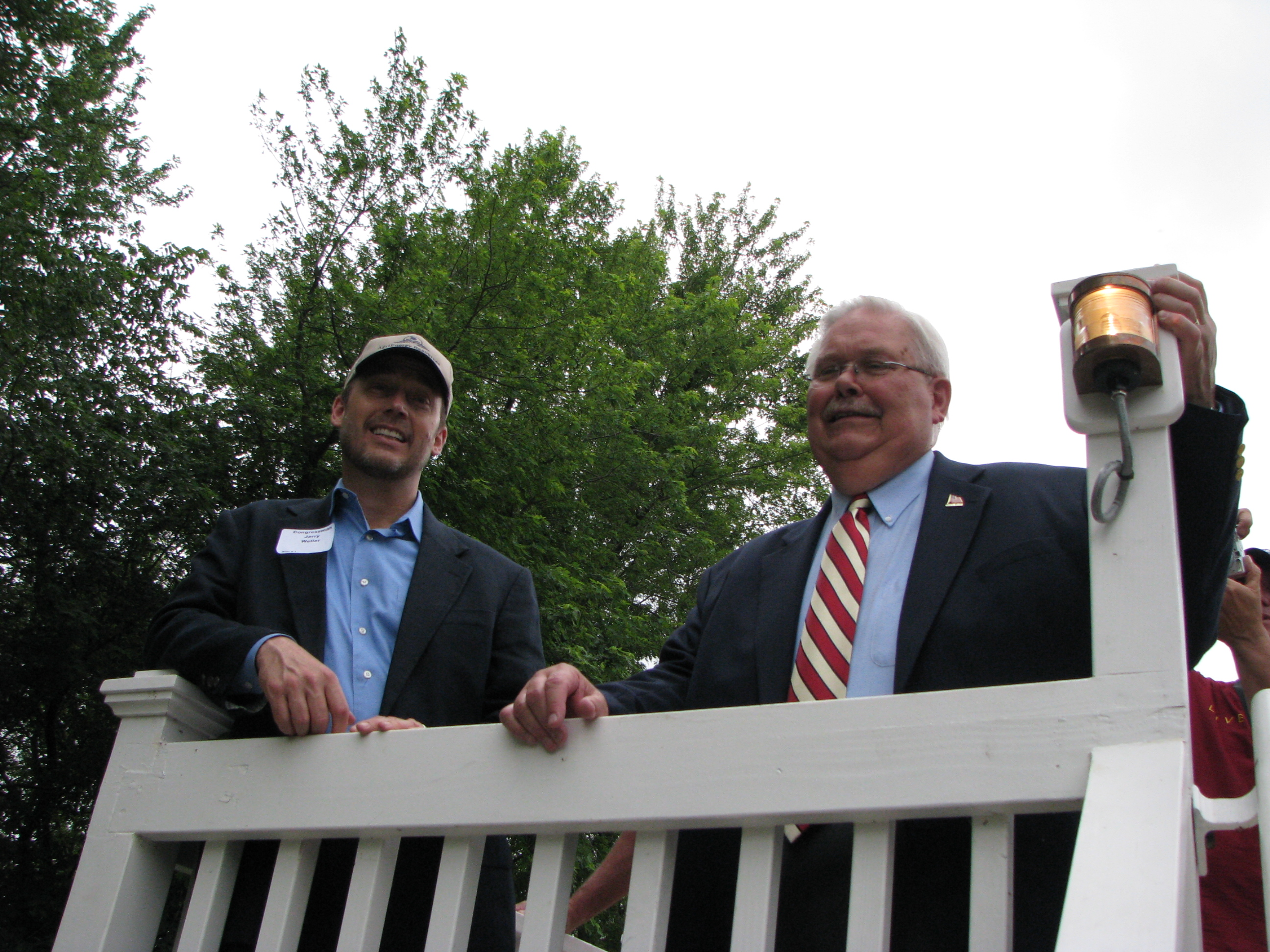
Then-Congressman Jerry Weller (left) and former LaSalle Mayor Art Washkowiak on the upper deck of The Volunteer.

The Volunteer takes up to 70 passengers on hour-long round trip journeys on a restored segment of the 96-mile (154 km) Illinois and Michigan Canal. While headed east from its dock at Lock 14, The Volunteer is pulled by one of two mules named "Moe" and "Larry" that walk along the adjacent towpath. The captain steers the boat by hand with the large wooden rudder at the back of the boat. Along the way an interpreter, dressed in period clothing, explains to passengers the history of the canal and what travel was like in the year 1848. Once the boat reaches the Little Vermilion River aqueduct, the mules are detached and the boat reverses using its twin 4-horsepower electric motors.
