= Voluntary =

Voluntary may refer to:

- Voluntary (music)
- Voluntary or volunteer, person participating via volunteering/volunteerism
- Voluntary muscle contraction

== See also ==
- Voluntary action
- Voluntariness, in law and philosophy
- Voluntaryism, rejection of coercion
- Voluntarism (disambiguation)
