= Voluntarism =

Voluntarism may refer to:

- Doxastic voluntarism, the philosophical view that people choose their own beliefs
- Voluntarism (philosophy), a perspective in metaphysics and the philosophy of mind that prioritizes the will over emotion or reason
- Voluntarism (psychology), the doctrine that the power of the will organizes the mind's content into higher-level thought processes
- Voluntaryism, a libertarian ideology based on contractualism and the absence of initiatory force or coerced association by any person, state, or collective
- Voluntaryism (religion), the belief that religious institutions should be supported by voluntary contributions rather than government subsidy

== See also ==
- Voluntary association
- Volunteerism, donating one's labor without monetary compensation
- Anarchism
- Agorism
