= Channahon, Illinois =

Channahon
- Village
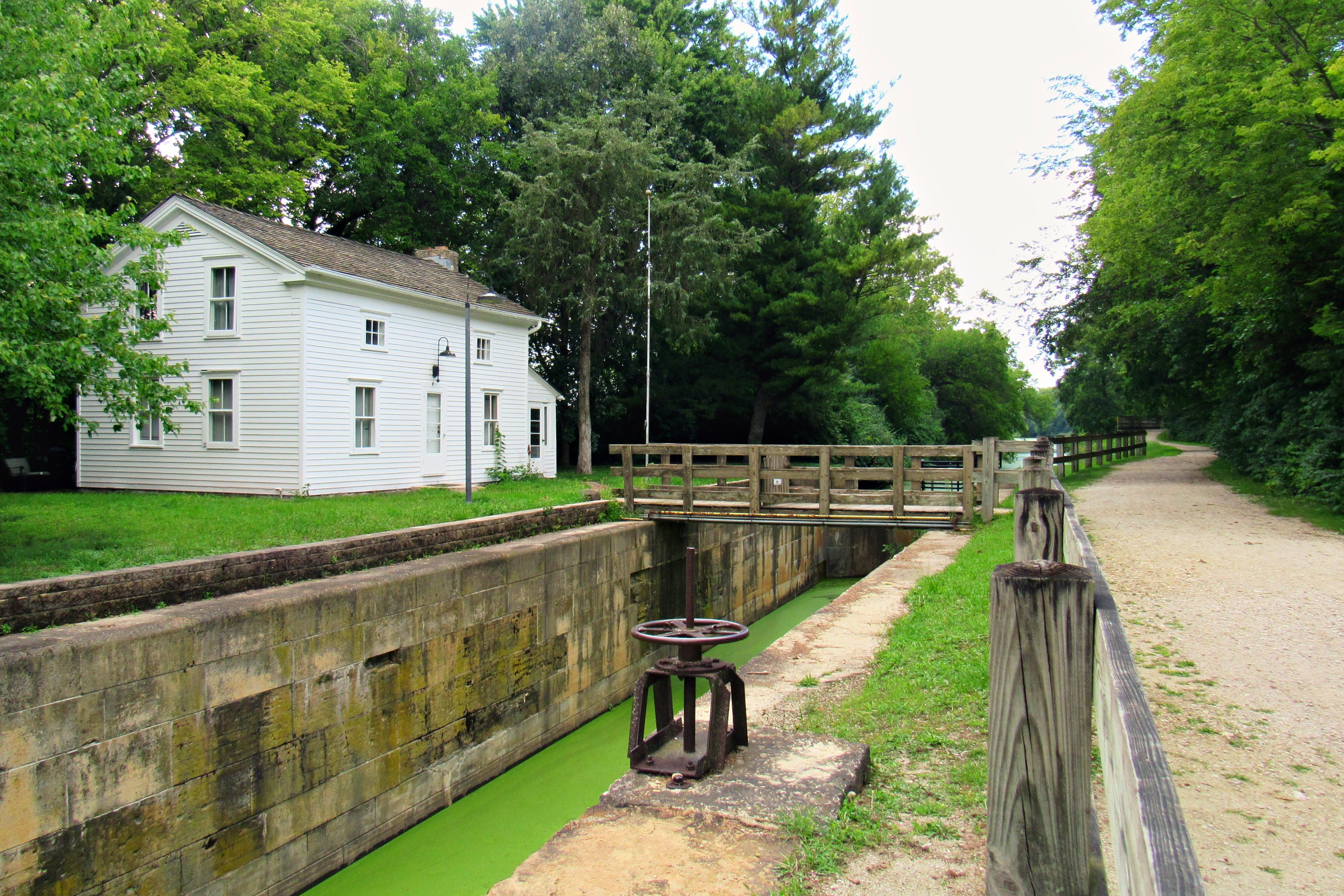
- The locktender’s house at I&M Canal Lock No. 6

- Flag Seal

- Location of Channahon in Grundy and Will Counties, Illinois

- Location of Illinois in the United States
- Coordinates: 41°25′17″N 88°15′39″W
- Country: United States
- State: Illinois
- County: Grundy, Will
- Townships: Channahon, Troy, Aux Sable, Goose Lake, Saratoga
- Incorporated: December 11, 1961

Government
  - Village President: Missey Moorman Schumacher

Area
  - Total: 16.90 sq mi (43.77 km^{2})
  - Land: 15.62 sq mi (40.46 km^{2})
  - Water: 1.27 sq mi (3.30 km^{2})
- Elevation: 600 ft (180 m)

Population (2020)
  - Total: 13,383
  - Density: 856.7/sq mi (330.77/km^{2})
- Time zone: UTC-6 (CST)
  - Summer (DST): UTC-5 (CDT)
- ZIP Code(s): 60410
- Area code: 815
- FIPS code: 17-12476
- GNIS feature ID: 2397601
- Website: www.channahon.org

Channahon (/ˈʃænəhɒn/ SHAN-ə-hon) is a village in Grundy and Will counties in the U.S. state of Illinois. The population was 13,383 at the 2020 census.

Located in a rural area southwest of Joliet, Illinois, Channahon lies at the confluence of the Des Plaines, Kankakee, and DuPage rivers, where they form the Illinois River. The Illinois and Michigan Canal also passes through the village, intersecting the DuPage River at Channahon State Park. Most of the village is within Channahon Township of Will County.

== History ==
Archaeological evidence suggests that the land on which the village now stands was inhabited as long as three to four thousand years ago by Mound Builders. When white settlers arrived in the early 1830s, the region was populated by Potawatomi, with whom the early settlers had friendly relations. The settlers began to call the area "Channahon," a Potawatomi phrase translated as "meeting of the waters."

When construction of the Illinois and Michigan Canal began in 1836, Channahon's location was chosen as the site for two of the waterway's locks. In 1845, Myrvin Benjamin plotted a new settlement to take advantage of the two rivers and the almost-completed canal surrounding the location. At first called "Du Page," the settlement was officially named Channahon when the township government was organized in 1850. By the 1870s Channahon was home to a growing population and contained a post office, a schoolhouse, a Methodist church, two blacksmithies, and several stores. The community prospered until the rise of railroad transportation in the late 19th century caused commerce and population in the canal town to diminish. The Village of Channahon was first incorporated in 1896, but dissolved in 1908 to avoid liability after an automobile fell into the DuPage River due to a bridge failure. Becoming a mainly agricultural community after the decline of canal commerce, Channahon saw slow growth in the first half of the 20th century.

On December 11, 1961 the area was reincorporated as the Village of Channahon. In the following decades, Channahon's proximity to two major interstates, I-80 and I-55, resulted in the village's rapid industrialization—notably including such facilities as a Mobil oil refinery, two petrochemical plants, a soybean oil production facility, an Amazon (company warehouse CenterPoint Intermodal Center in neighboring Elwood, and numerous warehouses in both Elwood and Joliet, including Amazon and Walmart distribution centers. Experiencing significant residential and commercial development from its industrial economy, Channahon has since grown into an affluent semirural suburb of Chicago.

== Geography ==
According to the 2021 census gazetteer files, Channahon has a total area of 17.01 square miles (44.06 km^{2}), of which 15.74 square miles (40.77 km^{2}) (or 92.50%) is land and 1.28 square miles (3.32 km^{2}) (or 7.50%) is water. Channahon borders the neighboring communities of Minooka, Shorewood, Joliet, Elwood, Wilmington, and Morris.

=== Climate ===
Channahon experiences cold winters with plenty of snow. Its summers are hot and humid, with cooling rains occurring frequently. The temperatures vary from 18 °F to 84 °F on average, with extremes reaching -2 °F and 92 °F on average.

Cloud coverage in Channahon varies from month to month. The time of the year with the most clouds is October 27 to June 13. The cloudiest month on average is December, and the least cloudy month on average is August.

Channahon has differing amounts of precipitation throughout the year. The time with the most rain is between March 27 to September 24. The month with the most precipitation is June.

== Demographics ==
Historical population
Census	Pop.	Note	%±
1900	261		—
1910	208		−20.3%
1970	1,505		—
1980	3,788		151.7%
1990	4,266		12.6%
2000	7,344		72.2%
2010	12,560		71.0%
2020	13,383		6.6%
U.S. Decennial Census

=== Racial and ethnic composition ===
Channahon village, Illinois – Racial and ethnic composition Note: the US Census treats Hispanic/Latino as an ethnic category. This table excludes Latinos from the racial categories and assigns them to a separate category. Hispanics/Latinos may be of any race.
Race / Ethnicity (NH = Non-Hispanic)	Pop 2000	Pop 2010	Pop 2020	% 2000	% 2010	% 2020
White alone (NH)	6,962	11,168	11,144	94.80%	88.92%	83.27%
Black or African American alone (NH)	31	156	168	0.42%	1.24%	1.26%
Native American or Alaska Native alone (NH)	7	6	8	0.10%	0.05%	0.06%
Asian alone (NH)	17	87	96	0.23%	0.69%	0.72%
Native Hawaiian or Pacific Islander alone (NH)	0	1	6	0.00%	0.01%	0.04%
Other race alone (NH)	10	9	55	0.14%	0.07%	0.41%
Mixed race or Multiracial (NH)	50	113	518	0.68%	0.90%	3.87%
Hispanic or Latino (any race)	267	1,020	1,388	3.64%	8.12%	10.37%
Total	7,344	12,560	13,383	100.00%	100.00%	100.00%

=== 2020 census ===
As of the 2020 census, Channahon had a population of 13,383, 4,547 households, and 3,665 families within the village. The population density was 856.7 inhabitants per square mile (330.8/km^{2}).

The median age was 38.8 years. 25.8% of residents were under the age of 18 and 13.1% were 65 years of age or older. For every 100 females, there were 99.4 males, and for every 100 females age 18 and over, there were 98.7 males age 18 and over.

96.5% of residents lived in urban areas, while 3.5% lived in rural areas.

Of households, 39.8% had children under the age of 18 living in them. 67.3% were married-couple households, 11.9% had a male householder with no spouse or partner present, and 15.2% had a female householder with no spouse or partner present. About 14.9% of all households were made up of individuals, and 6.9% had someone living alone who was 65 years of age or older. The average household size was 3.15 and the average family size was 3.44.

There were 4,684 housing units at an average density of 277.2 per square mile (107.0/km^{2}), of which 2.9% were vacant. The homeowner vacancy rate was 1.2% and the rental vacancy rate was 5.2%.

=== Income and poverty ===
The median income for a household in the village was $105,156, and the median income for a family was $111,662. The per capita income for the village was $40,721. About 2.3% of families and 3.8% of the population were below the poverty line, including 0.6% of those under age 18 and 3.7% of those age 65 or over.

== Arts and culture ==
=== Historic sites ===
The Illinois and Michigan Canal runs through the village, where it passes the locktender's house at Canal Lock No. 6 as well as the Dresden Mule Barn. The Briscoe Mounds stand near the Des Plaines River.

== Parks and recreation ==
Formed in 1971, the Channahon Park District maintains over 383 acres (1,550,000 m^{2}) of public parks. Facilities include:

- Channahon State Park, offering fishing and recreation beside the DuPage River; site of Forgotten Warrior Memorial
- McKinley Woods, featuring over 4 miles of walking trails near the banks of the Des Plaines River
- Community Park, Central Park, and Arroyo Trails
- Heritage Bluffs Public Golf Club
- Heritage Crossing Field House, with two gymnasiums, an indoor track, and fitness center.

== Government ==
Channahon is run by a Village Board of Trustees. The current President of the board of trustees is Missey Schumacher (elected in April 2015). At the county level, Will County residents are located within Board District 6, and are represented by Don Gould (R-Shorewood) and Joe VanDuyne (D-Wilmington). Grundy County residents are part of Board District 2, and they are represented by Chris Balkema (R), Debra Jo Kinsella (R), Lana Phillips (D), Eric Rasmusson (R), Greg Ridenour (R), and Deb Warning (R). In the Illinois State Senate, Channahon is represented by:

District	Name	Party	First Served	Area(s) of Channahon Represented
38	Sue Rezin	Republican	2010	Aux Sable Township, Channahon Township
42	Linda Holmes	Democratic	2007	Troy Township
43	Pat McGuire	Democratic	2012	Troy Township

In the Illinois House of Representatives, Channhon is represented by:

District	Name	Party	First Served	Area(s) of Channahon Represented
75	David Welter	Republican	2016	Aux Sable Township, Channahon Township
84	Stephanie Kifowit	Democratic	2013	Troy Township
86	Lawrence Walsh, Jr.	Democratic	2012	Troy Township

At the federal level, Channahon is represented by Senators Dick Durbin (D-Illinois) and Tammy Duckworth (D-Illinois), and Representatives Darin LaHood (R-16th District) and Jonathan Jackson (D-1st District).
