= List of killings by law enforcement officers in the United States, April 2026 =

This is a list of people reported killed by non-military law enforcement officers in the United States in April 2026, whether in the line of duty or not, and regardless of reason or method. The listing documents the occurrence of a death, making no implications regarding wrongdoing or justification on the part of the person killed or officer involved. Killings are arranged by date of the incident that caused death. Different death dates, if known, are noted in the description. The table below lists 110 people.

== April 2026 ==
| Date | Name (age) of deceased | Race | Location | Description |
|---|---|---|---|---|
| 2026-04-29 | Colton Copeland (29) | White | Twin Falls, Idaho | TFPD responded to a stabbing at St. Luke's Magic Valley Medical Center. Officers later identified the suspect and located him in a home. Upon arrival, officers set a perimeter and attempted to persuade him to surrender. The incident eventually ended with officers shooting Copeland, who was armed with a knife. The footage had been publicly released. |
| 2026-04-29 | Khalil Normi Jamal Smith (31) | Black | North Las Vegas, Nevada | NLVPD officers responded to a crash involving a man armed with a sharp object and had threatening manners. Upon arrival, the man was on the roof of the car while acting erratically. When officers ordered him to come down and drop the weapon, he jumped off and charged toward them. The officers then fired at him, killing him. |
| 2026-04-29 | unidentified male | Unknown | Phoenix, Arizona | Tolleson police found the suspect inside a car who was wanted on two felony warrants. The man showed a gun at officers then ran. Phoenix Police Department Special Assignment Unit arrived and located a man in a alley. They shot and killed him when the man pointed a gun at them. |
| 2026-04-29 | Chantez Loury (38) | Black | Columbus, Ohio | Officers tried to perform a traffic stop with an unidentified make-and-model vehicle in the North Linden neighborhood. Shortly after finding the abandoned vehicle, officers located a male matching the driver's description. The shooting occurred as they exited their cruiser to approach him. The man opened fire, wounding a Columbus officer before being fatally shot by police. The edited footage was released. |
| 2026-04-28 | unidentified male | Unknown | Thurston County, Washington | A Thurston County deputy attempted a stop on a second-generation Chevrolet Tahoe for speeding but the driver fled, leading to a vehicular pursuit. The chase ended after both parties crashed. The suspect then fled on foot before gunfire was heard by deputies. At some point, deputies fatally shot the suspect. |
| 2026-04-28 | Desaver Hollis (27) | Black | Richfield, Minnesota | During the early morning hours, Richfield officers responded to a report of a "car prowler" at an apartment complex near Richfield Middle School between the borders of Richfield and Minneapolis. When officers found the suspect, the man, from Plymouth, Minnesota, brandished a firearm. The suspect shot an officer in the hand before other officers fatally shot him. |
| 2026-04-27 | Joseph Moreno (36) | Hispanic | Maple Park, Illinois | A Naperville officer initially spotted a car whose driver was reported experiencing mental health crisis. The driver brandished a gun and fled, leading to a pursuit. Warrenville PD and ISP troopers later joined the pursuit and stopped the car with spike strips. An exchanged of fire subsequently ensued, during which, the driver was shot and killed. The footage was released. |
| 2026-04-27 | unidentified male | Unknown | Oakland, California | A man was shot and killed by Oakland officers after pointing a gun towards people and law enforcement in the East Oakland neighborhood during the afternoon hours. |
| 2026-04-26 | Luis E. Fernandez (36) | Unknown | Maple Falls, Washington | Fernandez, alongside one other person, both from Bellingham, were wanted for their suspected role in a Ferndale shooting on April 25 that left a 34-year-old man in critical condition. While attempting to arrest Fernandez, Fernandez attempted to shoot at officers. Shots were fired, and a Ferndale officer and a Whatcom deputy fatally shot Fernandez. Both officers were placed on administrative leave. The shooting happened while several officers took several other suspects into custody from a home. |
| 2026-04-26 | unidentified male | Unknown | Kansas City, Missouri | Missouri State Highway Patrol officers respond to a late-night domestic disturbance call in Northeast Kansas City. The armed man was contacted before getting out of his vehicle and went to the front porch of his home where he started shooting at officers. Officers fired back, killing him on-scene. |
| 2026-04-26 | Michael Williams (39) | Unknown | Rocky Mount, North Carolina | A Rocky Mount officer pursuit a man driving a white Jeep Grand Cherokee (WJ) that crashed into a ditch with its driver-side back tire blown out. Surveillance video captured both the suspect and the officer in a foot pursuit, before the officer fatally shot the suspect down. |
| 2026-04-26 | Obed Flores Trujillo | Hispanic | Houston, Texas | HPD Officers responded to a report of an incident at a Sam’s Club near Interstate 10 in the Market of Uvalde area. When they arrived, investigators learned a man had been vandalizing and breaking into vehicles in the parking lot. Store employees witnessed the incident and ran outside to confront the suspect before the suspect opened fire on them. Officers immediately shoot the suspect, killing him on-scene. The footage was released. |
| 2026-04-25 | Alba Giraldo (67) | Unknown | New York City, New York | An off-duty NYPD officer turned left at an intersection in Jackson Heights and struck Giraldo, who was walking on the crosswalk. She died 3 days later. The footage was released. |
| 2026-04-25 | Jordan Miller (37) | Unknown | Denver, Colorado | DPD officers respond to a report of a possible carjacking in the Hampden South area. Officers found the man during the early morning hours and the suspect pulled a gun on the officers, shooting once, before the suspect was gunned down by officers. |
| 2026-04-25 | Jesus Munoz-Duran (53) | Hispanic | Los Lunas, New Mexico | A New Mexico State Police trooper pulled over an unidentified truck in the Meadow Lake area. After Duran stepped out of the vehicle, he pulled out a gun at the trooper. One shot was fired before the trooper fatally shot him. The gun Duran had was reported stolen. The footage was released. |
| 2026-04-24 | unidentified male | Unknown | Plymouth, Massachusetts | A domestic violence incident turned into a pursuit involving Plymouth officers and a navy Volvo XC60 on Massachusetts Route 3A. The suspect crashed his Volvo after driving through the double yellow line and slammed head-on into a silver Porsche Macan. The driver of the Volvo died from his injuries. |
| 2026-04-24 | David Gallegos Jr. (45) | Hispanic | Las Cruces, New Mexico | Officers approached a man at a Walgreens near Interstate 25 who pulled out a gun at them. An officer fatally shot him afterward. LCPD had released the footage in a press conference. |
| 2026-04-22 | Dustin R. Horwoth (54) | Unknown | Belleville, Indiana | Horworth became a bank robbery suspect on the day beforehand on April 21. The next day, Plainfield officers obtained an arrest warrant and stopped Horwoth's vehicle. He drove away and a vehicular pursuit ensued. After police used a grappler device to end the chase, Horwoth fled on foot armed with a gun. For reasons unknown, police later shot him. |
| 2026-04-22 | Vladislav Verluka (34) | White | West Springfield, Massachusetts | WSPD were called to a home for a domestic dispute and found a man armed with kitchen knives. Taser deployments failed to stop the man from approaching before an officer opened fire. |
| 2026-04-22 | Robert Marion Phillips (63) | White | Jacksonville, Florida | A suspect was wanted in connection of a deadly shooting. JSO tracked the suspect and blocked his vehicle. The suspect then shot at them before being killed in the shootout. The footage was released. |
| 2026-04-22 | Jeffrey Parker (64) | Unknown | Woodstock, Georgia | Police pursued a Canton, Georgia man on Interstate 575. After arriving near mile marker 7 leading to Georgia State Route 92, the man allegedly fired at police, who returned fire, killing him. |
| 2026-04-21 | Damian Strozier (31) | Black | Marietta, Georgia | During a manhunt near Interstate 75 for the murder suspect, Strozier, who fatally rammed over a 67-year-old with an electric bike, reportedly pointed a gun at officers before running away. After a search, SWAT team found him and fatally shot him. |
| 2026-04-21 | Edward Lopez (69) | Hispanic | Manzano, New Mexico | Police were informed that Lopez was firing a gun at his home. When Torrance County deputies arrived, they found that Lopez had an outstanding misdemeanor warrant for his arrest. Lopez then went into his home before taking out a gun and fired at them. After two shootouts, he was shot dead by New Mexico State Police. A deputy was shot and injured. The footage was released. |
| 2026-04-21 | James Jones | Unknown | Asheville, North Carolina | A man was killed by police following a shootout at a strip mall. Officers respond to a report of a man with a gun, but after arrival, the man began firing at officers through the right glass window of a nail salon. Officers fired back, killing him. One officer suffered non-life threatening injuries. |
| 2026-04-20 | Ryan Sneed (39) | White | Columbia, Kentucky | Adair County deputies responded to a disturbance before being fired upon and pinned down by Sneed, who barricaded himself in a home. Additional agencies arrived and rescued them and tried to negotiate with Sneed. Sneed eventually exited with a handgun before KSP Special Response Team shot and killed him. Police later found three deceased family members and believed Sneed killed them. |
| 2026-04-20 | Demetri Zimmer (24) | White | Ashland, New Hampshire | An Ashland officer pulled over a first-generation Chevrolet Cruze with rear bumper damage. During the stop, the driver, a lifelong Laconia, New Hampshire resident, opened fire on the officer, wounding him. The officer immediately opened fire on the driver, killing him on-scene. |
| 2026-04-20 | Austin Derrell Robertson (32) | Black | Townville, South Carolina | Anderson County deputies pulled over a Dodge Challenger driven by a Harrisburg, Pennsylvania man on Interstate 85 near mile market 11 in Townville. Deputies pulled him over for a moving traffic violation who also called for backup afterward. While being interviewed, the man ran back to the rear of his car and grabbed his gun. He fired a shot at one of the deputies, wounding him, before another officer returned fire, killing the Pennsylvania man on-scene. The officer was flown by helicopter to a nearby hospital with a gunshot wound to the chest and survived. The edited dashcam footage had been released by SLED. |
| 2026-04-19 | unidentified male | Unknown | Ontario, California | OPD responded to a domestic disturbance involving an armed man. During the encounter, the man fired at them with a rifle, leading OPD to return fire, killing him. |
| 2026-04-19 | Joseph Munoz (48) | Hispanic | Nipomo, California | San Luis Obispo County deputies responded to a call about a man who threatened to kill his mother. Upon arrival, the suspect armed himself with a shotgun and shot at them. Deputies fired at him and killed him. |
| 2026-04-18 | Shamar Elkins (35) | Black | Bossier City, Louisiana | A lifelong Shreveport man killed eight children, seven of whom were his, in a series of shootings in Shreveport. Police pursued him to Bossier City, where they shot and killed him. |
| 2026-04-18 | Rexell Dallas Rice (58) | Unknown | Milledgeville, Georgia | Rice arrived at a house to pick up personal belongings when a domestic dispute occurred. Rice then left the house before returning later that morning, armed with three firearms, and fired shots toward the home. The residents barricaded themselves inside the home for safety, but Rice broke into the house and continued shooting. A Baldwin County deputy arrived at the home, encountered Rice, and gave verbal commands for Rice to drop his weapon. Rice refused to drop his weapon, and an exchange of gunfire took place between Rice and the deputy. The deputy was shot in the vest and survived, but Rice was pronounced dead. |
| 2026-04-18 | Randall Brian Lopez (36) | Hispanic | Santa Fe, New Mexico | An officer attempted to stop a motorcycle for speeding near Agua Fria and San Felipe. During the encounter, the suspect produced a firearm and fired it at the deputy, missing him. The deputy then returned fire, striking the suspect. |
| 2026-04-18 | David Douglas (35) | Unknown | Mountain View, Arkansas | An Izard County deputy fatally shot a knife-and-hammer-wielding Mountain Home, Arkansas man while officers respond to a report of a man making threats to people at a house between the Izard and Stone County border. |
| 2026-04-18 | Michael Vavasseur (34) | Black | Carencro, Louisiana | A Scott police officer attempted to pull over a Nissan Altima that was driven by a Duson, Louisiana man who was wanted after escaping from police custody in Opelousas three days prior. He refused to pull over, causing a pursuit between Scott officers, Carencro officers, and Louisiana State Troopers. Vavasseur stopped at a residence where a passenger got out and was taken into custody. He drove away and nearly hit a Carencro police officer. An officer shoots at the vehicle but the driver continued driving. The pursuit ended after the Altima collided with a law enforcement vehicle and was disabled. He got out of the Altima with a gun and ran off before firing at officers. Officers fatally shot him afterward and was pronounced dead on scene. |
| 2026-04-18 | Colin Barthelemy (26) | Unknown | Lexington, Massachusetts | Officers from the Lexington Police Department and the Northeastern Massachusetts Law Enforcement Council received a 911 call involving a man injuring himself with a knife, most likely attempting suicide. As officers arrived, police were able to escort two other residents out of the home, leaving Barthelemy the only person inside. Barthelemy ran out of the home soon afterwards and allegedly approached officers with a large kitchen knife. Officers tried to use non-lethal force twice but failed both times. A Wilmington officer fatally shot him, killing him on-scene. |
| 2026-04-17 | Guy Scott (60) | White | Coral Springs, Florida | |
| 2026-04-17 | Julie Ann Jenkins (49) | White | White Pine, Tennessee | |
| 2026-04-16 | David Robert McGuire (35) | White | Mink Shoals, West Virginia | A domestic situation that started in Chesapeake turned deadly after McGuire shot a female victim on Interstate 79. She was taken to a nearby hospital in stable condition. Meanwhile in the foreground, McGuire, of East Bank, West Virginia, continued driving on I-79 in a black unidentified pickup. The pursuit continued on the West Virginia Turnpike, made its way into the Kanawha City area and ended near mile marker 1 in the Mink Shoals area. McGuire crashed his truck and got out with a firearm in his hand. Officers fatally shot him afterward. |
| 2026-04-16 | David Ray Wyrick (59) | White | Pascagoula, Mississippi | Wyrick, a felon, rammed the truck carrying chemical tanks through a fence before he parked behind the Jackson County Emergency Operations Center, attempted to cause an explosion. He pulled a gun on officers before being shot dead. Wyrick had a long history of resisting arrest and attacking law enforcement. |
| 2026-04-16 | Gary Leroy Johnson (82) | Unknown | Butte, Montana | A man reportedly fired at his ex-wife. Butte Police responded and shot him when he raised a shotgun toward them. |
| 2026-04-15 | Alexander Jones (52) | Black | Goldsboro, North Carolina | A disturbance call response ended with the suspect, Jones, barricaded himself and fired at GPD and other agencies. Officers fired back. After several attempts, Jones surrendered but later died of his injuries. |
| 2026-04-15 | Ernest Begay (46) | Native American | Farmington, New Mexico | Begay was lying in the roadway. A FPD officer didn't see him and ran him over. A second vehicle also ran him over as well. |
| 2026-04-15 | Layla Sakowski (6) | White | Temple Terrace, Florida | As a driver, a mother, made a U-turn at the intersection, the Florida Highway Patrol reported that she turned in the path of a Temple Terrace police officer, leading to a collision. Sakowski was killed in the crash. |
| 2026-04-15 | Wilder Cobon Gomez (36) | Hispanic | Loachapoka, Alabama | A man who was serving a rape warrant was killed by officers after shooting at officers, wounding a Lee County deputy. While serving the warrant, deputies made entry in the attempt to serve the warrant and were immediately met by the man, who started shooting at officers. Other officers fired back, killing him. |
| 2026-04-15 | Isaiah Christopher Kirby (21) | Black | East Lansing, Michigan | Officers responded to a theft call at a business that later turned into a stabbing. Officers spotted Kirby, a Michigan State University student from Owings, Maryland, covered in blood and holding a knife. Officers told him to drop the knife but Kirby charged at them, leading police to shoot him multiple times. The footage was released. |
| 2026-04-15 | Jalen Carpenter (24) | Black | Chicago, Illinois | Illinois State Police responded to a domestic situation call in the Woodlawn neighborhood that originated at Interstate 57. Carpenter, who was previously charged with aggravated assault and use of a deadly weapon two months prior, was fatally shot by ISP troopers after pulling out a gun and firing it. The footage was released by ISP. |
| 2026-04-14 | Tyler Allen Gress (33) | White | Sacramento, California | Sacramento County Sheriff's deputies fatally shot Gress after a high-speed pursuit involving a first-generation Ford Fusion (pre-facelift) who was wanted for an armed carjacking. According to authorities, the man pointed a gun at another person, demanding their Fusion and threatening to kill them and any law enforcement who responded to the scene. Deputies attempted to pull him over but the pursuit continued into as far as the Sacramento International Airport before reaching Interstate 5 at Arena Boulevard in the Natomas area. Four deputies fatally shot Gress after getting out of the Fusion. |
| 2026-04-14 | Reginald Basile (46) | Black | Angola, Louisiana | Basile who was reportedly acting erratically, possibly drug-related, was beaten and retrained by 5 correctional officers in Louisiana State Penitentiary dormitory. He was seen unresponsive after being carried out by a stretcher and was later pronounced dead. |
| 2026-04-14 | Shane L. Bryant (33) | White | Knoxville, Tennessee | Deputies pulled over a small motorcycle who was driving without headlights on near Clinton Highway and Interstate 275 North. The man ran off from officers while armed with a knife. Deputies later killed him while pursuing on foot. |
| 2026-04-14 | Noemi Guzman (31) | Hispanic | Omaha, Nebraska | Omaha Police responded to a report of a woman attempting to kidnap a 3-year-old boy at knifepoint at the parking lot leading to a South-Central Omaha Walmart. After officers gave commands to drop the knife, the woman slashed the boy before officers fatally shot her. A still image of Guzman holding a knife toward the baby from the officer's bodycam was shown in a press released. |
| 2026-04-13 | Nicholas Maslowski (31) | White | Milwaukee, Wisconsin | Milwaukee Police pursued a Toyota Corolla driven by a man who was diagnosed with schizophrenia and had stopped taking his medication. Maslowski was also wanted for a homicide involving a 27-year-old man who was riding in the passenger seat. The pursuit happened across downtown Milwaukee before crashing on a bridge near 35th and National. Maslowski got out and ran off on foot before being fatally shot by eight officers. The 27-year-old man with multiple gunshot wounds was treated at the scene.The footage was released |
| 2026-04-13 | unidentified male | Unknown | Queen Creek, Arizona | Maricopa County deputies respond to a barricaded suspect who refused to get out of a house. When officers made contact with him, the man opened fire on officers before officers fired back, killing him. |
| 2026-04-13 | Teddy Joe Shell Kelsey (46) | White | Bokchito, Oklahoma | Bokchito Police officers contacted a man with an arrest warrant from Choctaw Tribal Courts. Teddy pulled out a gun, shot once, and fled the scene. As officers approached the home, Teddy again brandished a firearm, leading to an officer-involved shooting, as an officer killed Teddy afterward. |
| 2026-04-13 | unidentified male | Unknown | Katy, Texas | Brookshire officers tried to initiate a traffic stop in Brookshire, but the driver kept going. The pursuit lasted into both Brookshire and into Katy, where Katy officers joined in. The pursuit ended at Interstate 10 near mile marker 740. The man exited the vehicle and fled on foot with a firearm. Shots were fired between the suspect and officers from both departments. After the suspect was struck, he was taken to a nearby hospital where he died later on. |
| 2026-04-12 | Steven Chad Myers (52) | White | Lubbock, Texas | LPD responded to a report of a suicidal male and found the man sitting inside a truck. Officers approached the door and talked to him for 30 minutes. The man reportedly reached for a replica gun before three officers opened fire. |
| 2026-04-12 | Tommy Ray Sevier (46) | Unknown | Texarkana, Arkansas | An ASP trooper pulled over a GMC Yukon driven by Sevier for an active felony warrant. Sevier shot at the trooper before the trooper and a TAPD officer returned fire and killed him. |
| 2026-04-12 | Irene McIntyre (46) | Unknown | LaFayette, New York | A female suspect ran over and killed woman with her vehicle before crashing into another vehicle trying to stop her, injuring a man. A state trooper arrived and found the suspect continued to drive in a threatening manner and running over the female victim and a second man that tried to intervene. The trooper ultimately shot and killed the suspect. Attorney's General released the footage. |
| 2026-04-12 | James Robert Allison (66) | White | Lafayette, Indiana | LPD responded to a report about an intoxicated man pointing a gun at someone. Officers later shot the man after he refused to drop the gun despite multiple commands. |
| 2026-04-12 | Timotheus Reed (38) | Black | Leesburg, Florida | Lake County deputies responded to a stabbing and a deputy shot the suspect, Reed. Only the aftermath footage was released by police. |
| 2026-04-12 | Antonio Christopher King (45) | Black | Dothan, Alabama | A citizen called the police for a man walking around with a handgun. When DPD arrived, King fired and officers returned fire. King then ran to his home which led to a three-hour-standoff. King eventually exited his home and fired at police again. Officers fired back and killed him. |
| 2026-04-12 | Eric H. Compton (53) | Unknown | Christiansburg, Virginia | During a domestic dispute investigation, the suspect pulled out a handgun, prompting CPD officers to set up a perimeter and negotiate with him. A short time later, he came out the home again while armed and approached the officers. Despite less-lethal efforts, the suspect drew a gun before officers opened fire, killing him. |
| 2026-04-12 | Nicholas Toler (19) | Unknown | Welches, Oregon | A DUI suspect fled an attempted traffic stop conducted by state troopers at the intersection of Highway 26. After a chase through Clackamas County, the suspect crashed his pickup truck into a wooden fence. Law enforcement officers fatally shot him later. |
| 2026-04-11 | unidentified male | Unknown | Houston, Texas | During a traffic stop, a police sergeant tried to detain the driver. The driver resisted arrest which led to a physical altercation. The sergeant would then opened fire and struck the suspect multiple times. After the shooting, the suspect ran from the scene before being found with gunshots wounds. The footage had been released by HPD. |
| 2026-04-11 | Anthony Griffin (44) | Black | New York City, New York | A Bronx freestyle rapper named after WNYW-TV who stabbed two elderly men and an elderly woman on a subway platform at Manhattan's Grand Central Terminal with a machete was shot dead by NYPD officers. All three victims are expected to survive. |
| 2026-04-10 | Giovanni Montoya Guzman (41) | Hispanic | Bakersfield, California | Kern County deputies responded to an initial shooting and chased the suspect until he crashed the vehicle. The deputies shot and killed him when he opened fire on them. KCSO released the footage. |
| 2026-04-10 | Danny Davis (52) | White | Cleveland, Tennessee | Cleveland Police responded to a call regarding a man armed with a gun at an apartment complex. When they found Davis, Davis reportedly pointed a gun at them before two officers shot him. |
| 2026-04-10 | Larry Don Beiter (39) | White | Carney, Oklahoma | A suspect was killed in a police shooting under unknown circumstances. |
| 2026-04-10 | Brett E. Kuneman (45) | White | Rushville, Indiana | Rush County deputies and Rushville Police came to a home for a domestic disturbance report. An armed man and a woman exited the home. Despite several commands, the man didn't comply and officers shot him. |
| 2026-04-10 | Luis Francisco Torres (65) | Hispanic | Tucson, Arizona | TPD responded to a report about a suspicious man. When they contacted him, he produced a knife. Despite less-lethal efforts, the man refused to drop it and was fatally shot by officers. The footage had been released. |
| 2026-04-09 | Withor Morales (60) | Hispanic | Porterville, California | Tulare County deputies attempted to serve an eviction notice on Morale. Morale barricaded himself and fired at them with a high-powered rifle. Detective Randy Hoppert from the sheriff's office was struck and killed in the incident. CHP helicopters, Crisis negotiators and several SWAT teams were later deployed to the scene to locate the suspect. After founding him at a yard, Morale fired at a Kern County SWAT team BearCat vehicle which drove into the yard. Members inside soon decided to run him over, killing him on scene. |
| 2026-04-09 | Richard Garfinkle (58) | Unknown | Highwood, Illinois | HPD responded to a home for an intoxicated suicidal male after receiving a call from his family members. Upon arrival, officers located a man who locked himself in a bathroom. At some point, the man suddenly appeared with a replica gun before being shot. |
| 2026-04-09 | Alan Joseph Chandler (30) | White | Lavonia, Georgia | Lavonia Police attempted to serve felony arrest warrants at a home after Chandler attacked a city employee with a pipe. At some point in the confrontation, Chandler fired at police with a rifle. GSP SWAT Team members and Franklin County Sheriff’s Office deputies returned fire and killed him. |
| 2026-04-09 | Bradley Barnum (44) | White | Chippewa Falls, Wisconsin | CFPD responded to a report about wanted subjects at the Country Inn & Suites hotel on U.S. Route 53. When they made contact with three subjects in a vehicle, one fled on foot while brandishing a handgun, leading to a foot chase. Once the subject jumped a patio railing, an officer opened fire. |
| 2026-04-09 | Amare James Garlington (23) | Black | Aurora, Colorado | Aurora Mental Health called APD for a suicidal person. Crisis Response Team arrived and encountered a man holding a butcher knife to his neck, threatening to kill himself or others and hoped to be killed. At some point, the man ran out of the residence and started to stab an officer on his head. The injured officer shot him dead. |
| 2026-04-08 | unidentified male | Unknown | Jonesville, Louisiana | A man was shot and killed by state police and other law enforcement following a multi-parish chase. |
| 2026-04-08 | William James Rogers (75) | Unknown | Burleson, Texas | After responding to a structure fire, a suspect shot at law enforcement, injuring a Johnson County deputy. They returned fire and killed Rogers. |
| 2026-04-08 | Anthony Murillo (35) | White | Paris, Texas | Law enforcement responded to a report about a man waving a knife at another person. When they pulled him over, the man injured a DPS trooper with the knife before a Paris officer fatally shot him. |
| 2026-04-08 | Jose Orozco (34) | Hispanic | Bradley, Illinois | Officers arrived to conduct a well-being check when they encountered a man with a knife. The man ignored the officers' commands and the man attempted to approach them, causing officers to fatally shoot him. |
| 2026-04-08 | Stephen James Alexander (41) | White | Commerce, Georgia | A Bank County deputy found a man who was wanted in the connection to a road rage incident. Alexander refused to pull over at Interstate 85 near mile marker 150, leading officers into a brief pursuit before they hit Alexander's Chevrolet Equinox to a halt with a PIT maneuver. After a this maneuver near mile marker 149, Alexander allegedly fired at deputies, who then returned fire, striking him. |
| 2026-04-08 | unidentified male | Unknown | Escondido, California | San Diego County deputies fired at a suspect as they were investigating a reported stabbing. |
| 2026-04-08 | Jesus Ernesto Jaime (30) | Unknown | East Los Angeles, California | A dangerous pursuit involving LAPD and a BMW 530i ended near Interstate 5 with an exchange of gunfire, killing the male driver and injuring the passenger. LAPD released the video. |
| 2026-04-07 | Sean Daniel (50) | Black | Yonkers, New York | Officers respond to a report of a man attacking multiple people with a knife at a residence. They arrived at the scene encountered what officials described as an active assault in the building’s entryway. Officers found the man assaulting a resident before tasing him twice, which failed. After officers shot the suspect, he was placed in handcuffs and died after arriving at a nearby hospital. |
| 2026-04-07 | unidentified male | Unknown | Collingdale, Pennsylvania | Police and SWAT arrived at a residence for a burglary in progress. They deployed tear gas and flash bangs inside which sparked a structure fire. One suspect came out and was arrested but another was found dead inside the home. Sources believe one of the suspects likely died due to smoke inhalation. |
| 2026-04-07 | David Donald Ducado Menton (42) | White | Superior, Wisconsin | A SPD officer approached a wanted man from Solon Springs, Wisconsin who was along with two people. One of the people tried to flee and engaged in a physical altercation with the officer. The officer fatally shot the person, killing him. His death sparked outrage and a small protest was held at the Douglas County Courthouse afterward. |
| 2026-04-07 | Anthony McKinley (75) | Black | Philadelphia, Pennsylvania | PPD officers responded to a report of a man with a gun who took his family hostage in West Philadelphia. When two officers arrived, they saw McKinley standing on the front porch of the home. As the officers got out of their vehicle, McKinley allegedly pointed a handgun at them. Both officers took cover and told him to drop the weapon, but he refused. McKinley fired one shot towards them, and an officer fired one shot back, striking McKinley. Officers took him to a nearby hospital where he was pronounced dead. The officer who shot McKinley was placed on administrative leave. |
| 2026-04-07 | Tamondrick J. Burroughs Jr. (32) | Black | Chesterfield, Virginia | Officers responded to a report of a man armed with a rifle and screaming. While officers arrived on-scene, the caller reported that the man ran into his own home. They went to the house and searched it. The officers reportedly identified themselves and saw the man, armed with a rifle, in the doorway of his home. One officer fatally shot the man, killing him on-scene. |
| 2026-04-07 | Christopher Thomas Shepard (35) | White | Henry County, Virginia | A North Carolina man who was wanted on attacking his girlfriend pulled out his gun in front of deputies in the woods. A SWAT team member fatally shot him. The deputy was immediately placed on administrative leave following the killing. |
| 2026-04-07 | Ronald Breese (76) | White | Socrum, Florida | Polk County deputies responded to the home for a reported suicide attempt after Breese called the Veterans Crisis Line on the phone, telling operators that he has five guns in his home. When deputies arrived, they found the man sitting in a chair on his porch with a gun to his head. Officers tried to de-escalate the situation and talk Breese into putting down the weapon. He stood up, and fired one shot at deputies. Four deputies returned fire, three from handguns and one with a rifle, killing Breese on-scene. |
| 2026-04-06 | Joannie Jose Armenta (15) | Hispanic | Tucson, Arizona | Tucson Police SWAT officers responded to a home invasion where an 8-year-old child was held inside with two armed robbery suspects. The child was safely evacuated by police but one of the two male suspects refused to surrender. Despite negotiation efforts, the suspect still threatened to shoot the police. Eventually, the suspect emerged from the home and raised a toy gun that was wrapped in cloth toward the police. Two SWAT team members shot him. He was sent to a hospital and succumbed to his injuries. The footage had been released by police. |
| 2026-04-06 | Gary Blaylock (45) | White | Booneville, Arkansas | The Booneville Police Department engaged in a high-speed pursuit after one of its officers attempted to stop a Chevrolet Silverado on Arkansas Highway 23. Prior to the chase, an officer pulled over the Silverado but the suspect refused to comply and proceeded southbound. Arkansas State Police joined in the pursuit afterward which led BPD officers to execute a rolling block maneuver near the ARS Dale Bumpers Small Farms Research Center. After the pursuit, the man got out of his Silverado with a firearm in hand. A Booneville officer and an Arkansas trooper discharged their service weapons, killing him on-scene. |
| 2026-04-06 | Nathan Walker (18) | White | Louisville, Kentucky | Detectives from LMPD's Criminal Interdiction Unit received information that a suspect wanted in a homicide investigation was near Interstate 65 in downtown Louisville. Several agents acted on the tip and searched for the suspect. Agents discovered him sitting on a retaining wall behind Taco Bell next to I-65 on East Broadway. When officers approached him, they called him by his name and told him to put his hands on his head. The suspect pulled out a gun, leading to a shootout. As he fell to the ground, he refused to drop his weapon. Officers fired at the suspect again, killing him. The officers were placed on administrative leave.The footage was released. |
| 2026-04-06 | Megan Whiting (32) | White | Northfield, New Hampshire | A woman was shot and killed by an officer in a domestic disturbance. Few details were immediately released. |
| 2026-04-04 | Eric Baker (52) | White | Mesa, Arizona | Mesa PD attempted to stop Baker for riding a bike without a front light. Baker fled before crashing the bike. Several officers tased him and used force when he resisted arrested. After taking him into custody, Baker became unresponsive and died. Police released the footage. |
| 2026-04-04 | Benjamin Greenfield (40) | White | Colorado Springs, Colorado | Colorado Springs Task Force officers and a deputy with the El Paso County Sheriff's Office spotted a vehicle occupied by a man and a woman. Law enforcement approached and identified themselves, at which the male driver allegedly tried to drive away, though his car became stuck. The woman exited the car, but the man refused. The man pulled out a gun and fired one shot at officers. Three Colorado Springs deputies fatally shot the man, killing him on-scene. |
| 2026-04-04 | Jacob Graves (29) | White | Boston, Massachusetts | Police were called for a mental health crisis at an apartment near Northeastern University. The suspect reportedly attacked officers with a sword, leading them to shoot him. |
| 2026-04-03 | Richard Todd Forrest (63) | Unknown | Power County, Idaho | Near the Portneuf River, Power County deputies shot a suspect who killed two and injured another. |
| 2026-04-03 | James Andrew Thompson (64) | Unknown | Hickory, North Carolina | A suicidal man who shot at passing cars was shot by HPD when he allegedly raised the gun at responding officers at front porch. A passing driver was struck by one of Thompson's shots. |
| 2026-04-03 | Eliar Real Hernandez (45) | Hispanic | Westmont, California | LASD officers responded to an assault with a deadly weapon call at a Mobil gas station between South Vermont Avenue and 115th Street. Hernandez opened fire on another man before both ran away, but officers caught up with him at a nearby neighborhood. He was armed with a weapon and did not comply with demands to drop the weapon, leading officers to kill him on-scene. The victim was transported by LAFD with a gunshot wound to his abdomen, in stable condition. |
| 2026-04-02 | Ronnie Phillips (60) | Unknown | Sturgis, Kentucky | Crittenden County deputies, who attempted to serve an emergency guardianship paperwork at a home, exchanged gunfire with a suspect. The suspect was killed and a deputy was shot.Deputy Rick Coyle, the deputy who was shot, succumbed to his injuries in late April. |
| 2026-04-02 | Robert Williams (64) | Unknown | Greensboro, Alabama | An officer shot Williams during a shootout at a traffic stop. Police said Williams produced a firearm and shot the officer. |
| 2026-04-02 | Lucien Colon (44) | Hispanic | New York City, New York | A man who was on parole for a 2013 murder, a Level 3 sex offender in a 1997 rape, and previously arrested for attempted murder in 1995, was shot and killed by the NYPD's Bronx Warrant Squad while they attempted to serve a warrant in an apartment at the Mott Haven neighborhood in the Bronx near the Willis Avenue Bridge. The footage had been released by New York State Attorney General. |
| 2026-04-01 | unidentified male | Unknown | Snohomish County, Washington | Sheriff's deputies respond to a report of a disturbance in a Martha Lake neighborhood involving a man with a firearm. When deputies arrived, they saw the man still armed with the weapon. Officers opened fire, killing him. |
| 2026-04-01 | Kevin Blevins (52) | Unknown | Englewood, Florida | Charlotte County Sheriff's deputies responded to a home for a report about a person being held at gunpoint. Upon arrival, deputies evacuated the occupants and shot a male who refused to drop the gun. |
| 2026-04-01 | Maley Elizabeth Ross (27) | White | Ocean Springs, Mississippi | Upon arrival at an apartment for a noise disturbance call, Jackson County Deputy Michael Jimerson exchanged fire with a fleeing suspect. Both were killed in the shootout. |
| 2026-04-01 | Erik Torres (29) | Hispanic | East Los Angeles, California | LASD was called for Torres, who was reported for harming himself. Upon arrival, Torres was observed holding a handgun. Despite de-escalation efforts, he eventually fired at officers (blank shots), before they fired back and killed him. Police released the footage. |
| 2026-04-01 | Benjamin David Board (45) | White | Wichita, Kansas | Board, who was wanted in connection to eight counts of sexual exploitation of a child, was arrested by Wichita Police. Board allegedly pulled a gun on officers before they shot and killed him. The footage was released. |
| 2026-04-01 | Alejandro Corona Jr | Hispanic | Houston, Texas | HPD officers observed a man with a black bicycle on the wrong side of the roadway in a low-lit area known for high drug activity. The man then fled on the bicycle which led to a pursuit. When the chase ended, the man walked toward a residence despite officers' verbal commands before an officer deployed a taser, striking him. The man died at a hospital. The footage was released. |
| 2026-04-01 | Shahzad Gaziani (49) | Asian | Houston, Texas | A man was seen making jabbing motions with a butcher knife at a parking lot. He was shot dead by HPD after coming out an apartment unit with the knife. The footage was released by HPD. |
| 2026-04-01 | unidentified male | Unknown | Chester, Pennsylvania | A suspect fatally stabbed a woman and fatally shot a man at a residence before CPD arrived and shot him dead. |
| 2026-04-01 | Marsean Jacue Taylor (34) | Unknown | Tulsa, Oklahoma | Tulsa Police responded to a report of a man threatening convenience workers with a knife. Officers arrived on scene and shot him because he didn't follow orders. Police said the man was tied to an earlier stabbing and a homicide the day before. |

== See also ==
- Death in custody § United States
- Henry A. Wallace Police Crime Public Database
- List of cases of police brutality
- List of countries with annual rates and counts for killings by law enforcement officers
- List of law enforcement officers killed in the line of duty in the United States
- List of law enforcement officers convicted for an on-duty killing in the United States
- List of shootings by US immigration agents
- List of police reforms related to the George Floyd protests
- List of unarmed African Americans killed by law enforcement officers in the United States
- Lists of killings by law enforcement officers
- Police brutality in the United States
- Police misconduct § United States
- Police riot § United States
- Police use of deadly force in the United States
