= History of Bartow, Florida =

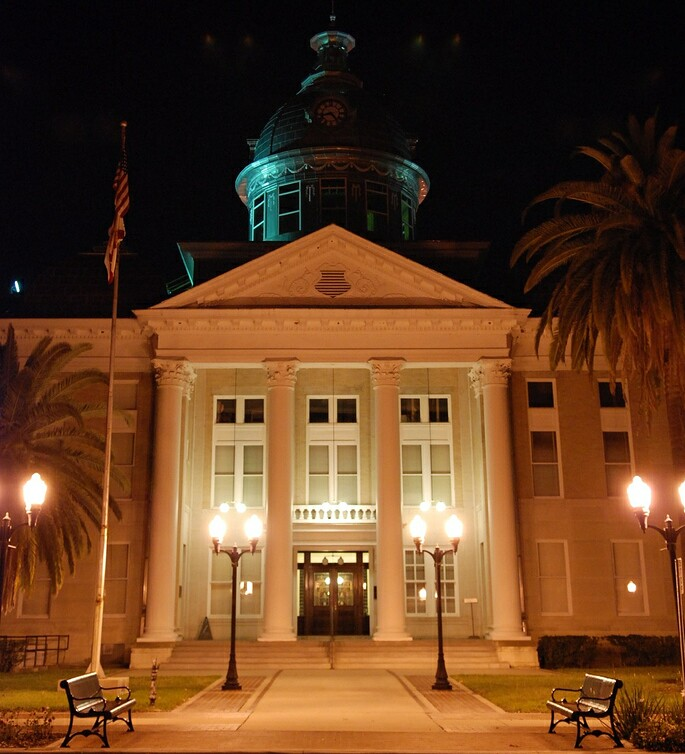
The old Polk County Courthouse at the corner of Broadway Avenue and Main Street

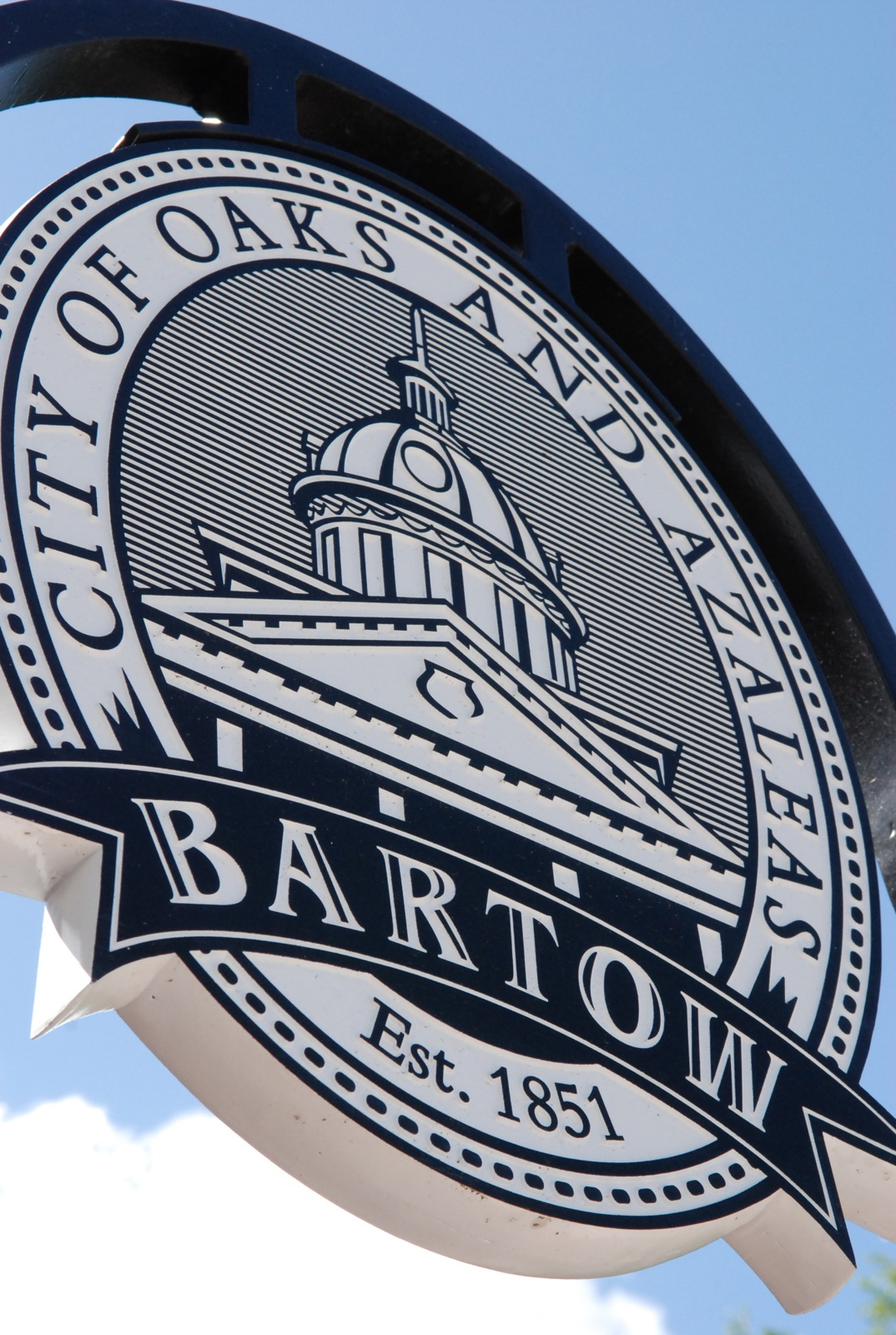
The seal of the City of Oaks and Azaleas

The history of Bartow, Florida spans over 150 years, although humans have inhabited the area for close to 12,000 years. Established in 1851 by settler and veteran Readding Blount, the city has gone from being a small frontier outpost vulnerable in the Seminole Wars to being the county seat of Polk County, a county of more than half a million people.

Located near the geographic centers of both peninsular Florida and Polk County, Bartow is located at the headwaters of the Peace River, and is less than an hour's travel from the cities of Tampa and Orlando. Bartow has remained a small city in spite of the rapid growth around it, although with the annexation of over 18,000 acres of former phosphate-production industrial land owned by the Clear Creek Development Company, Bartow has already more than quadrupled in size and is projected to triple in population within the next twenty years.

Bartow is connected to the public figures of former Florida governor and U.S. senator Spessard Holland, controversial Florida Secretary of State Katherine Harris, Playboy Playmate Jaime Faith Edmondson, Tony-winning actress Karen Olivo, Winston Cup stock car driver Rick Wilson, student protestor Marshall Ledbetter, Pro Bowl linebacker Ray Lewis, and motocross legend James "Bubba" Stewart Jr.

== Pre-Columbian era to statehood ==
The geographic history of the Florida peninsula is one of constant expansion and contraction. At various times in its history, the Florida peninsula has been a series of small island with only small slivers, such as the ridges in Polk County above water, and other times a much wider peninsula than it is today. It was during a time when Florida was at its widest that the first paleo-indians probably arrived in the Bartow area as they followed big game such as woolly mammoth southward. At the time, the climate of the area was much different than it is today; cooler, drier- probably similar to that found in the British Isles today.

The first Paleo-indians reached the central Florida area near the end of the last ice age, as they followed big game south. These first Floridians were hunters and small gatherers and left little lasting impact on the area. As the ice melted and sea levels rose, these groups set up permanent residence. These people thrived on the Florida peninsula for thousands of years and it is estimated that by the time the first Spanish conquistadors arrived, there were 250,000 Native Americans living on the Florida peninsula. Some of these first early tribes were the Tocobago, Timucua and the Calusa. In 1527, a Spanish map showed a settlement near the Rio de la Paz. The arrival of the Spanish turned out to be disastrous to these Native American tribes. Within 150 years, the majority of the pre-Columbian Native American peoples of Florida had been wiped out. Those who had not succumbed to diseases such as smallpox or yellow fever were either killed or enslaved. Little is left of these first Native Americans cultures in Polk County except for scant archeological records including a few personal artifacts and shell mounds. Eventually the remnants of these tribes would merge with Creek Indians who arrived from the north and become the Seminole Indian tribe.

Meanwhile, European powers were struggling to establish themselves on the Florida peninsula. The Spanish, French and British all gained and lost control over Florida before the United States finally gained permanent control of the peninsula in 1819. By this time, the Seminoles had established themselves on the peninsula and proved to be an impediment to white settlement of Florida. At first, the United States attempted to force the Seminoles onto a large reservation covering much of Central Florida, which included the land now part of present-day Bartow. At the conclusion of the First Seminole War, the United States passed the Indian Removal Act of 1830, which attempted to remove most of the Seminoles to Oklahoma.

== Antebellum beginnings ==
In 1845 Florida became the 27th state and settlement spread south of Gainesville. This growth was slow at first: heat and humidity, dangerous wildlife, and uncharted swampland made a comfortable life in southern Florida problematic. A bigger potential threat were those Seminoles who had decided to stay instead of going to Oklahoma. These Indigenous people were, for the most part, peaceful; but many white settlers felt uneasy about the continued Seminole presence around the Peace River and stories were told of attacks "not far away." As a result, many of these early settlements were built as forts to discourage any aggression.

The Armed Occupation Act of 1842 prohibited settlement near the Peace River as that was considered Seminole land; however cattlemen eventually moved in from Tampa Bay and into the area surrounding the Peace River.

In 1851, the settlement of Fort Blount was founded by Readding Blount just west of current downtown Bartow. This settlement was eventually renamed Peace Creek or Peas Creek. As settlement grew, the residents began to plant citrus trees and build one room school houses and churches.

== Civil War ==
About a month after Florida seceded from the Union, Polk County was formed from the eastern portion of Brevard County with a small sliver of Brevard County added. Records of the time indicate that there were three voting precincts at the time- Fort Meade, Fort Fraser (near present-day Highland City), and Socrum (north of Lakeland). The first site chosen for the county seat was actually near present-day Highland City, but the war meant that the plans for building the seat would be delayed. At the time there were still few families living in Polk County. Like much of the south, the Civil War had significant effects on everyday life in Polk County. Commerce and education were nearly nonexistent near the end of the war. At war's end, there was only one school open in the entire county located in Bartow. Fort Meade, the largest city in the county at the time, was burned to the ground in May 1864.

== Reconstruction ==
After the war, the county commission decided to rename the town Bartow after the first Confederate officer to die in the war. At this time, a wealthy cattleman named Jacob Summerlin donated a large part of the old Blount homestead. This land would be used to build the first Polk County courthouse, the first high school in the county, and two churches. This proved to be the crucial event in the development of both Bartow and Polk County. Although growth was slow at first and Bartow had less than 80 permanent residents by 1880, the town would grow exponentially in the last two decades of the 19th Century. In 1887 the first brick schoolhouse south of Jacksonville was built. This school named Summerlin Institute (now Bartow High School) would eventually become one of the most respected high schools in the south. Around the same time, the first library in central Florida would be built. By the turn of the century, Bartow would become the third most populous city in central Florida and the fifteenth most populous in the state.

== 20th Century to Present ==
During the 20th century, Bartow grew slowly as the rest of the state experienced a huge population boom. In 1909, a new courthouse was built on the corner of Main Street and Broadway Avenue. This courthouse is still standing and is the current site of the Polk County Historical Museum.

As the city grew, a number of industries moved into the Bartow area. In the first few decades of the 1900s, thousands of acres of land around the city were purchased by the phosphate industry and Bartow would become the hub of the largest phosphate industry in the United States. After a succession of freezes north of Polk County, the county eventually became the leading citrus county in the United States and much of the agriculture of areas surrounding Bartow is citrus based. In 1941, the city built an airport northeast of town. This airport was taken over by the federal government during World War II. This airport would be the training location for many Army Air Corps pilots. This airport would eventually be returned to the city in 1967.

In 2004, Bartow was severely impacted by three hurricanes which hit the area within a space of 44 days. The eye of all three hurricanes, Hurricane Charley, Hurricane Frances and Hurricane Jeanne, passed within 10 miles (16 km) of town. The damage from the three storms, especially Charley, was extensive. Every school in the county sustained some damage from the storm and were closed down for two weeks. For many months afterwards, blue tarps covering rooftops were a common site throughout the city.

For most of the 20th century, Bartow's growth was modest, especially in comparison to the rest of the county and state. While other cities in Polk County aggressively annexed adjacent land and allowed rapid growth, the government of Bartow generally took a more cautious approach. This has changed in the past decade after Connecticut financier Stanford Phelps had purchased the former Clear Springs phosphate land. When buildout of the Clear Springs development is completed by 2030, it is expected that the population of Bartow could nearly triple to over 45,000 residents.

== African Americans in Bartow ==
According to the United States Census Bureau, the African American population of Bartow was 28% in 2000. As a city which has been an ideal representation of life in the Deep South for much of its history, the life experiences of whites and blacks in Bartow have differed over the years. The three iconic figures of Bartow history – Francis Bartow the confederate general, Jacob Summerlin the slave-owning cattle king, and Spessard Holland the segregationist governor and senator – have not only been white, but whites who seemed in opposition to the goal of civil rights for blacks. So the history of Bartow as told in historical records often omits the black history of the city of Bartow and its surrounding areas.

A little known fact usually not found in books about the history of the area is that the first non-Indians to settle in the Bartow area was not the settlement which became Fort Blount. In 1818, a small group of escaped slaves from other states moved into the area south of Lake Hancock and founded a settlement called Minatti. This settlement was thirty years before the first white settlers arrived in the area and the people of this settlement were called Black Seminoles either because they were culturally Indian or had intermarried with them.

Later, the first white settlers came and brought slaves into Peas Creek. The area on the west side of town in which the African American slaves dwelt was called the "Negro Quarters" or simply "The Quarters" by whites and "Over the Branch" by blacks. This area was geographically separated from the rest of Bartow by the McKinney Branch, a small creek which separated the wooded area west of town from the rest of the town.

In 1901, Fred Rochelle, a 16-year-old African-American, was lynched in a carnival-like atmosphere, allegedly for rape. In 1906, two African-Americans, John Black and Sam Hagin were lynched for attempting to quit a job.
