= Aux Sable Township, Grundy County, Illinois =

Aux Sable Township
- Township
- Location in Grundy County

- Grundy County's location in Illinois
- Coordinates: 41°25′N 88°19′W
- Country: United States
- State: Illinois
- County: Grundy
- Established: November 6, 1849

Area
  - Total: 30.38 sq mi (78.7 km^{2})
  - Land: 29.09 sq mi (75.3 km^{2})
  - Water: 1.29 sq mi (3.3 km^{2}) 4.26%
- Elevation: 551 ft (168 m)

Population (2020)
  - Total: 15,361
  - Density: 528.1/sq mi (203.9/km^{2})
- Time zone: UTC-6 (CST)
  - Summer (DST): UTC-5 (CDT)
- ZIP codes: 60447, 60450, 60481
- FIPS code: 17-063-03090

Aux Sable Township (Note: /ˌɔːks ˈseɪbəl, ˌoʊks-/) (T34N R8E) is one of seventeen townships in Grundy County, Illinois, United States. As of the 2020 census, its population was 15,361 and it contained 5,184 housing units.

== Geography ==
According to the 2021 census gazetteer files, Aux Sable Township has a total area of 30.38 square miles (78.68 km^{2}), of which 29.09 square miles (75.34 km^{2}) (or 95.74%) is land and 1.29 square miles (3.34 km^{2}) (or 4.26%) is water.

=== Cities, towns, villages ===
- Channahon (west half)
- Minooka (southwest three-quarters)

=== Unincorporated towns ===
- Aux Sable at 41.395°N 88.329°W
- Sand Ridge at 41.424°N 88.326°W

(This list is based on USGS data and may include former settlements.)

=== Ghost town ===
- Dresden at 41.403787°N 88.279481°W

=== Cemeteries ===
The township contains these three cemeteries: Aux Sable, Dresden and Saint Marys.

=== Major highways ===
- Interstate 80
- U.S. Route 6

=== Airports and landing strips ===
- Three Rivers Farm Airport

=== Rivers ===
- Des Plaines River

=== Landmarks ===
- Il Dept Of Transportation-Rest Area

== Demographics ==
As of the 2020 census there were 15,361 people, 4,596 households, and 3,609 families residing in the township. The population density was 505.58 inhabitants per square mile (195.21/km^{2}). There were 5,184 housing units at an average density of 170.62 per square mile (65.88/km^{2}). The racial makeup of the township was 80.62% White, 2.84% African American, 0.48% Native American, 1.18% Asian, 0.09% Pacific Islander, 4.54% from other races, and 10.25% from two or more races. Hispanic or Latino of any race were 15.24% of the population.

There were 4,596 households, out of which 52.90% had children under the age of 18 living with them, 65.77% were married couples living together, 9.81% had a female householder with no spouse present, and 21.48% were non-families. 18.80% of all households were made up of individuals, and 7.40% had someone living alone who was 65 years of age or older. The average household size was 2.90 and the average family size was 3.33.

The township's age distribution consisted of 30.4% under the age of 18, 8.8% from 18 to 24, 28.9% from 25 to 44, 24.7% from 45 to 64, and 7.2% who were 65 years of age or older. The median age was 33.5 years. For every 100 females, there were 88.9 males. For every 100 females age 18 and over, there were 86.9 males.

The median income for a household in the township was $90,069, and the median income for a family was $94,092. Males had a median income of $61,713 versus $32,430 for females. The per capita income for the township was $33,072. About 4.2% of families and 4.7% of the population were below the poverty line, including 4.5% of those under age 18 and 9.6% of those age 65 or over.

Historical population
Census	Pop.	Note	%±
2000	4,506		—
2010	13,061		189.9%
2020	15,361		17.6%
U.S. Decennial Census

== School districts ==
- Minooka Community Consolidated School District 201
- Minooka Community High School District 111

== Political districts ==
- Illinois's 11th congressional district
- State House District 75
- State Senate District 38
