= Minooka, Illinois =

- Village
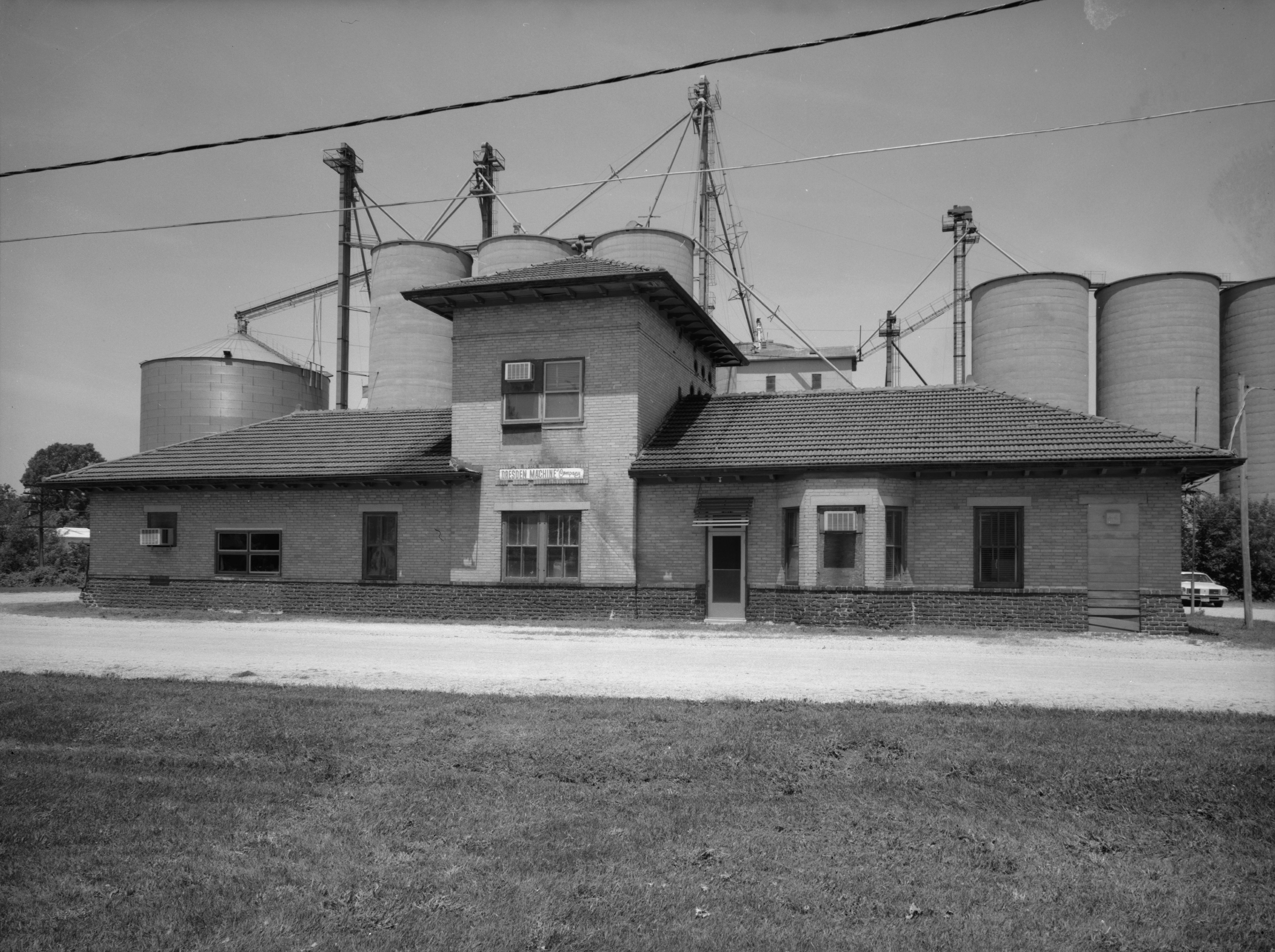
- CO&P rail station (1986)
- Motto: "A nice place to call home"
- Location of Minooka in Will County, Illinois
- Coordinates: 41°27′02″N 88°16′45″W
- Country: United States
- State: Illinois
- Counties: Grundy, Kendall, Will
- Townships: Aux Sable, Seward, Channahon
- Founded: 1869

Area
  - Total: 9.48 sq mi (24.55 km^{2})
  - Land: 9.41 sq mi (24.36 km^{2})
  - Water: 0.073 sq mi (0.19 km^{2})
- Elevation: 597 ft (182 m)

Population (2020)
  - Total: 12,758
  - Density: 1,356.5/sq mi (523.75/km^{2})
- Time zone: UTC-6 (CST)
  - Summer (DST): UTC-5 (CDT)
- ZIP code: 60447
- Area codes: 815 & 779
- FIPS code: 17-49607
- GNIS feature ID: 2399376
- Website: www.minooka.com

Minooka is a village in Grundy, Kendall, and Will counties, Illinois, United States. The population was 12,758 at the 2020 census, up from 10,924 at the 2010 census. The village is part of the Chicago metropolitan area.

== History ==
Minooka was established as a place in 1852 when the railroad was built through this area. It was incorporated as a village in 1869. The name "Minooka" is derived from a Native American word meaning "maple forest" or "good earth".

The Chicago, Rock Island and Pacific Railroad served the town at Minooka Station.

== Geography ==
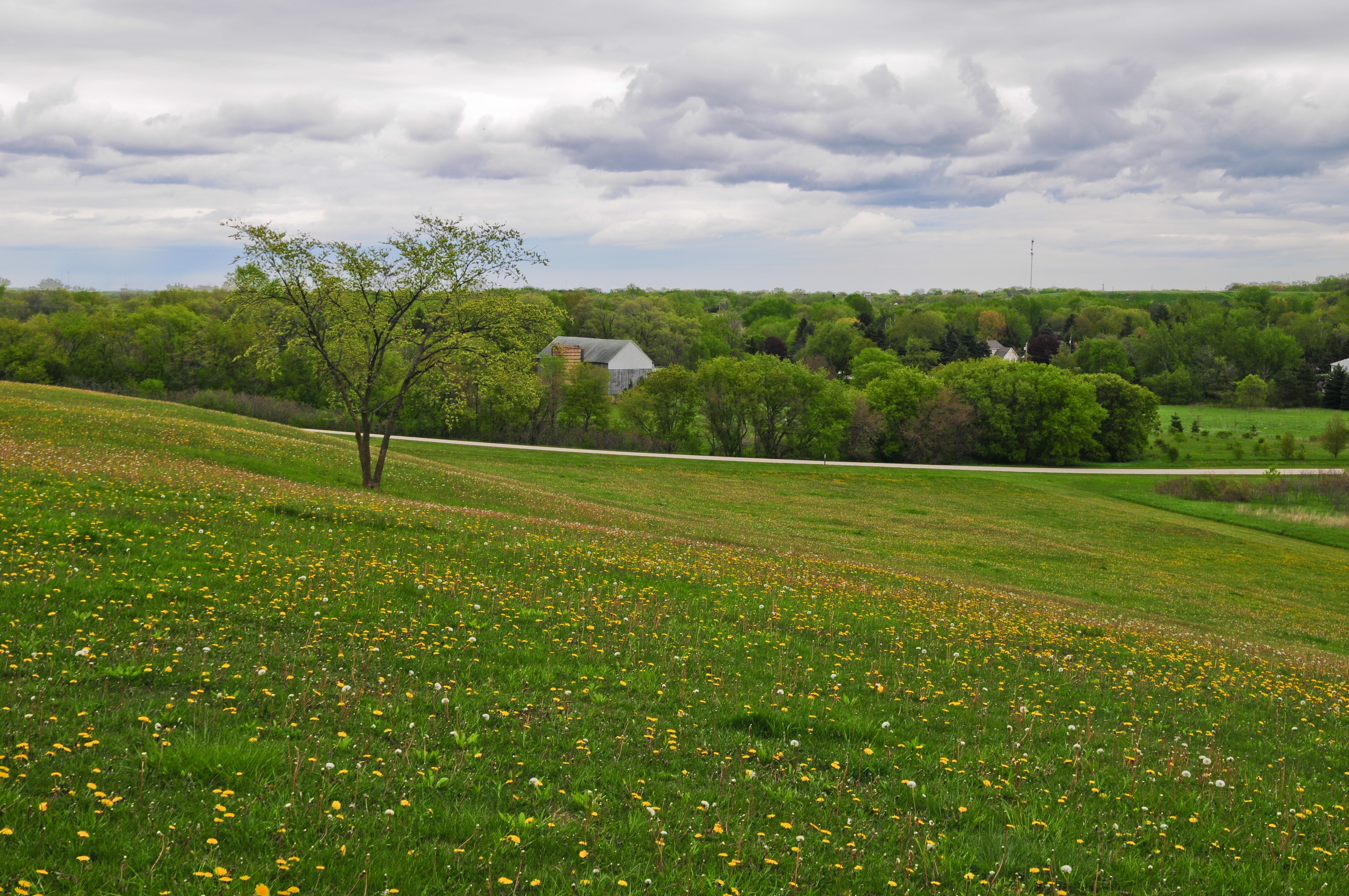
Open fields near Minooka, Illinois

The center of the village is in the northeast corner of Grundy County. The village limits extend north into the southeast corner of Kendall County and east into Will County. The village is bordered to the east and south by the village of Channahon.

Interstate 80 passes through the north side of the village, with access from Exit 122. I-80 leads northeast 11 miles (18 km) to Joliet and west 45 miles (72 km) to LaSalle. Downtown Chicago is 48 miles (77 km) northeast of Minooka via Interstates 80 and 55. U.S. Route 6 runs along part of the southern border of Minooka; the highway leads east into the center of Channahon and southwest 9 miles (14 km) to Morris.

According to the 2021 census gazetteer files, Minooka has a total area of 9.48 square miles (24.55 km^{2}), of which 9.41 square miles (24.37 km^{2}) (or 99.22%) is land and 0.07 square miles (0.18 km^{2}) (or 0.78%) is water. The DuPage River, a south-flowing tributary of the Des Plaines River, forms part of the eastern boundary of the village.

== Demographics ==
Historical population
Census	Pop.	Note	%±
1880	416		—
1890	360		−13.5%
1900	424		17.8%
1910	361		−14.9%
1920	314		−13.0%
1930	346		10.2%
1940	317		−8.4%
1950	369		16.4%
1960	539		46.1%
1970	768		42.5%
1980	1,565		103.8%
1990	2,561		63.6%
2000	3,971		55.1%
2010	10,924		175.1%
2020	12,758		16.8%
U.S. Decennial Census

=== Racial and ethnic composition ===
Minooka village, Illinois – Racial and ethnic composition Note: the US Census treats Hispanic/Latino as an ethnic category. This table excludes Latinos from the racial categories and assigns them to a separate category. Hispanics/Latinos may be of any race.
Race / Ethnicity (NH = Non-Hispanic)	Pop 2000	Pop 2010	Pop 2020	% 2000	% 2010	% 2020
White alone (NH)	3,815	8,916	9,804	96.07%	81.62%	76.85%
Black or African American alone (NH)	6	338	403	0.15%	3.09%	3.16%
Native American or Alaska Native alone (NH)	5	14	14	0.13%	0.13%	0.11%
Asian alone (NH)	12	125	130	0.30%	1.14%	1.02%
Native Hawaiian or Pacific Islander alone (NH)	0	0	0	0.00%	0.00%	0.00%
Other race alone (NH)	0	8	31	0.00%	0.07%	0.24%
Mixed race or Multiracial (NH)	20	132	507	0.50%	1.21%	3.97%
Hispanic or Latino (any race)	113	1,391	1,869	2.85%	12.73%	14.65%
Total	3,971	10,924	12,758	100.00%	100.00%	100.00%

=== 2020 census ===
As of the 2020 census, Minooka had a population of 12,758. The median age was 33.8 years. 31.0% of residents were under the age of 18 and 8.3% were 65 years of age or older. For every 100 females, there were 97.0 males, and for every 100 females age 18 and over, there were 94.3 males.

89.7% of residents lived in urban areas, while 10.3% lived in rural areas.

There were 4,032 households in Minooka, of which 49.5% had children under the age of 18 living in them. Of all households, 64.9% were married-couple households, 11.0% were households with a male householder and no spouse or partner present, and 17.8% were households with a female householder and no spouse or partner present. About 13.6% of all households were made up of individuals, and 4.7% had someone living alone who was 65 years of age or older.

There were 4,110 housing units, of which 1.9% were vacant. The homeowner vacancy rate was 1.0% and the rental vacancy rate was 2.6%.

=== Income and poverty ===
The median income for a household in the village was $97,097, and the median income for a family was $100,097. Males had a median income of $62,403 versus $31,581 for females. The per capita income for the village was $34,655. About 5.2% of families and 5.3% of the population were below the poverty line, including 5.7% of those under age 18 and 3.8% of those age 65 or over.

== Education ==
Minooka Community Consolidated School District 201 (elementary district) has a total of seven schools and serves nearly 4,000 students. Minooka Community High School District 111 has a campus for juniors and seniors and a newer campus for freshmen and sophomores.

== Notable people ==
- Carlos Avery, Minnesota newspaper publisher, politician, and conservationist
- Dale Coyne, Indy Car team owner
- Sal Fasano, former Major League Baseball player
- Mike Foltynewicz, Major League Baseball player
- Tanner Laczynski, National Hockey League player
- Nick Offerman, actor (Ron Swanson on Parks and Recreation)
