= 2026 Shreveport shooting =

Mass shooting in Louisiana, US

- Elkins (circled) running from the scene
- Location: 32.4328°N 93.7615°W; Cedar Grove, Shreveport, Louisiana, US
- Date: April 19, 2026 c. 5:55 a.m. – 7:03 a.m. (CDT; UTC−05:00)
- Attack type: Mass shooting; mass murder; child murder; filicide; carjacking
- Weapons: .22-caliber Mossberg 715P; Small-caliber handgun
- Deaths: 9 (including the perpetrator)
- Injuries: 4 (2 by gunfire)
- Perpetrator: Shamar Elkins
- Motive: Domestic dispute

On April 19, 2026, a mass shooting occurred at a home in the Cedar Grove neighborhood of Shreveport, Louisiana, United States. The perpetrator, 31-year-old Shamar Elkins, killed eight children between the ages of 3 and 11. Seven were his own children, and one was their cousin. His wife, Shaneiqua Pugh, and his ex-wife, Christina Snow, the mother of three of his children, were wounded by gunfire.

Elkins fled after a carjacking and led police on a pursuit into Bossier City, Louisiana. He died during a confrontation with officers; a preliminary autopsy attributed his death to a self-inflicted gunshot wound.

== Background ==
According to the nonprofit organization Gun Violence Archive, there were six incidents of mass murder in the United States in 2026 before the Shreveport shooting. (Note: The Gun Violence Archive defines incidents in which four or more people are killed as "mass murder".) It was the deadliest mass shooting in the United States in more than two years, after the 2024 Joliet shootings, and the deadliest mass shooting on a single day in Louisiana history. (Note: The deadliest mass shooting in Louisiana are the shootings of Mark Essex, where he murdered 9 people over the span of eight days in December 1972 and January 1973.)

Shreveport has about 180,000 residents, and more than 30 percent of the city's homicides were classified as domestic in nature, according to City Council member Grayson Boucher. Boucher said there was "a true epidemic of domestic violence" across Shreveport. In March 2026, the Shreveport City Council voted to withdraw from a partnership with the Caddo Parish Sheriff's Office to operate a domestic violence resource center at a new police substation. Shreveport's mayor Tom Arceneaux said his office was working to support a comprehensive domestic violence center being established by the Caddo Parish sheriff.

Elkins and Shaneiqua Pugh married in 2024. Elkins had previously been married to Christina Snow. Snow allegedly said in a Facebook post in 2016 "Wish i never met you Shamar Elkins."

== Shooting ==
Police response timeline April 19, 2026; times are CDT
Time	Event
5:55 a.m.	Police receive the first call, concerning a disturbance at a residence in the 300 block of West 79th Street. Dispatch is told that Elkins has shot everyone inside the home. The caller reports that she and her children escaped from the roof and are in the backyard.
6:01 a.m.	Officers arrive on scene.
6:07 a.m.	Police receive a second call, concerning a shooting in the 500 block of Harrison Street.
6:08 a.m.	The Harrison Street victim identifies Elkins as the suspect.
6:10 a.m.	Dispatch links the Harrison Street shooting to the West 79th Street incident.
6:15 a.m.	Officers learn that Elkins carjacked a red Kia Sportage near West 79th Street and Linwood Avenue.
6:17 a.m.	Police observe the vehicle traveling south on Interstate 49.
6:29 a.m.	Officers make contact with Elkins; shots are fired.
7:03 a.m.	Elkins is pronounced dead at the scene on Brompton Lane.

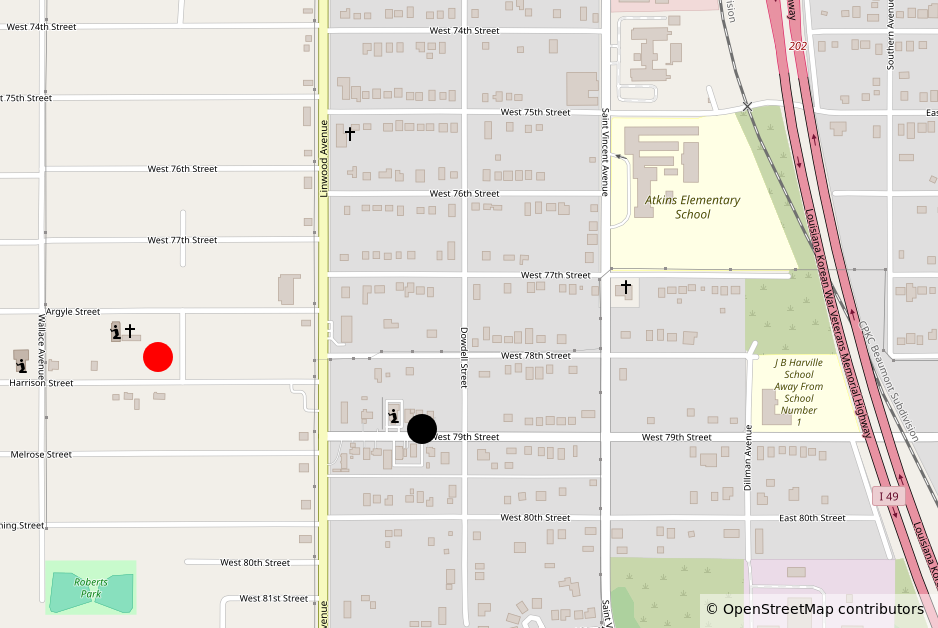
Red circle: the 500 block of Harrison Street, where Christina Snow was shot Black circle: the 300 block of West 79th Street, where the initial violence occurred and eight children were killed

The attack began at a home on Harrison Street at around 5:55 a.m., where Elkins' ex-wife Christina Snow was shot nine times and critically injured; Snow said the gunman had taken her three children and fled. The gunman then drove to the 300 block of West 79th Street, where eight children were killed. It is believed that when the gunman entered the home, all the children in the house were asleep.

At the West 79th Street house, Elkins' wife Shaneiqua Pugh was shot, but was not killed. Keosha Pugh, the sister of Shaneiqua, was also living in the house with her 12-year-old daughter and 10-year-old son who was one of the eight children that were killed; both mom and daughter were injured while escaping by jumping from the roof. Shortly after the shooting a family member received a phone call from Keosha, who said; "He done shot the kids, he killed the kids".

A small-caliber handgun was used in some of the shootings. A neighbor two houses down from the West 79th Street home said her security camera captured video of the perpetrator running away, with gunshots being heard.

At approximately 6:00 a.m., police officers responded to a domestic disturbance report on West 79th Street. The perpetrator then carried out a carjacking and fled the scene, leading to a car chase with officers. The chase extended into Bossier City, Louisiana, about 15 miles away, where Elkins died from a gunshot. There are conflicting reports as to whether he was killed by a police officer, or died by suicide. Elkins had a rifle-style pistol when police confronted him.

A preliminary autopsy report said that Elkins died from a self-inflicted gunshot wound.

== Victims ==
Five girls and three boys, ranging in age from 3 to 11 years old, were killed. Those killed were identified by the Caddo Parish Coroner's Office as Jayla Elkins, aged 3, Shayla Elkins, 5, Kayla Pugh, 6, Layla Pugh, 7, Markaydon Pugh, 10, Braylon Snow, 5, Khedarrion Snow, 6, and Sariahh Snow, 11. Seven of the children were fathered by Elkins, and one child, Markaydon Pugh, was the son of Elkins' brother-in-law, and the children's cousin.

Four people were left wounded. Two were shot: his wife, Shaneiqua Pugh, who was the mother of four of his children; and Christina Snow, his ex-wife, and the mother of three of his children. Two were injured but not shot: Keosha Pugh, sister of Shaneiqua; and Keosha's 12-year-old daughter, who both jumped from the West 79th Street roof; the mother suffered broken bones but the daughter only had scratches.

== Aftermath ==
Louisiana Governor Jeff Landry and his wife Sharon, announced that their foundation Love One Louisiana would cover the funeral expenses of all victims of the shooting. Kristi Gustavson, the CEO of the Community Foundation of North Louisiana announced two separate funds, one to help provide needs for survivors and another specialized in domestic violence protection.

A prayer vigil was held on April 20, in honor of the victims and their families as well as the Cedar Grove community. The funeral service took place on May 9 at Summer Grove Baptist Church located in Shreveport.

== Perpetrator ==
The perpetrator was identified as 31-year-old Shamar Elkins (December 7, 1994 – April 19, 2026), of Shreveport. A relative said Elkins and his wife were in the middle of separating and were due in court on April 20. Elkins' brother told reporters that Elkins had been distraught about his marriage breaking down, with Elkins telling him "Bro, I don't want to lose my wife."

Elkins served in the Louisiana Army National Guard as a signal system and fire support specialist from 2013 to 2020. He was never deployed and left as a private. At the time of the shooting, Elkins worked for United Parcel Service.

Elkins had a prior criminal conviction in Caddo District Court. In 2019, he was arrested on two charges: illegal use of weapons and carrying a firearm on school property. According to a police report, Elkins stated that he had walked outside to meet a friend who was going to pick him up, when another person in the car pulled a gun and pointed it at him; Elkins admitted to firing five rounds at the car as it left. The incident took place less than 300 feet from Caddo Magnet High School, and the gunshots were fired in the direction of the school while children were playing outside. Elkins pleaded guilty to the illegal weapons charge in October 2019; the second charge was dismissed, and Elkins was placed on probation for 18 months. In 2016, he was also convicted of driving while intoxicated.

Elkins' mother, Mahelia Elkins, gave birth to her son as a teenager and gave him away due to her crack cocaine dependency. He was raised by a family friend, Betty Walker, although Elkins eventually reconnected with his biological mother in the mid-2010s. Walker said that in 2023, when Elkins' soon-to-be-wife Shaneiqua Pugh said she was considering leaving Elkins and taking her children with her, he was furious, and said to Pugh that if they tried to leave, "I'll kill you, my kids and myself."

Walker stated that in February 2026, Elkins had attempted to kill himself. Afterward, Walker said Elkins took medicine and partook in counseling at a nearby Veterans Affairs hospital. According to a cousin of his brother-in-law, Elkins visited the hospital for a mental health evaluation and stayed for a week and a half before he was released. According to his biological mother Mahelia, he called her home on April 5, telling his stepfather that he was having "dark thoughts" including suicide, abruptly ending the call after stating "Some people don't come back from their demons."

Shreveport police said they were not aware of prior domestic violence issues.

== Investigation ==
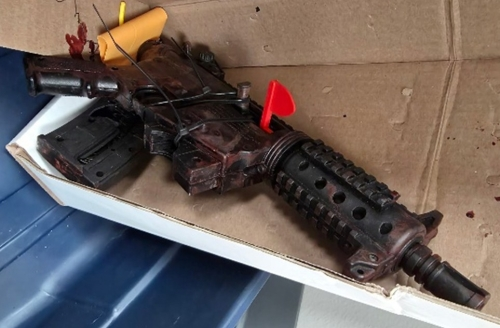
The Mossberg 715P used in the shooting

Police indicated that the incident spanned four separate crime scenes. Authorities said the motive is currently unknown, but investigators believe the shooting was "entirely a domestic incident".

On April 21, authorities announced the arrest of 56-year-old Charles Ford, a convicted felon, in connection to the rifle used in the shooting. According to prosecutors, Ford initially denied having the gun, but later said he believed Elkins had stolen it from his truck. A court affidavit says Ford confronted Elkins, but "let it go" after Elkins became "offensive". Under Louisiana law, a person convicted of illegal use of a weapon is banned from having a gun for at least 10 years, so neither Elkins nor Ford should have been able to own a gun. Federal Alcohol, Tobacco and Firearms agents are investigating; the Federal Bureau of Investigation has offered help.

== Reactions ==
Tom Arceneaux, the mayor of Shreveport, said at a news conference: "It's a terrible morning in Shreveport, and we all know my heart goes out to this entire community for the tragic event that has taken place this morning." He described the shooting as "a tragic situation, maybe the worst tragic situation we've had".

The Caddo Parish Public Schools superintendent Keith Burton called on the community to take care of its children and families, and those that are carrying the weight of the tragedy.

Governor Jeff Landry pledged state funds to pay for the funerals of the victims and said, "I couldn't place myself in the shoes of any father who could execute their child or their children. It was from one house to the other. It wasn't a fit of rage when he snapped once. It was systematic."

Kathryn Spearman, an assistant professor at Pennsylvania State University who studies the intersection of domestic violence and child abuse, compared the family massacre with Justin Fairfax's murder of his wife and suicide four days earlier. Both perpetrators possessed a gun, were in the middle of contentious divorce proceedings, and expressed depressive thoughts to confidants. She said "Systems need to recognize these patterns as risk factors."

== See also ==
- 2026 in Louisiana
- Crime in Louisiana
- Mark Essex, a spree killer known as the "New Orleans Sniper"
- Marcus Wesson, mass murderer whose victims were also his children
- 2026 Pawtucket shooting, high-profile domestic-related mass shooting that occurred two months earlier
- 2024 Joliet shootings, another familicide spree-shooting that occurred two years earlier
