= Minooka station =

Former train station in Illinois, United States

Minooka
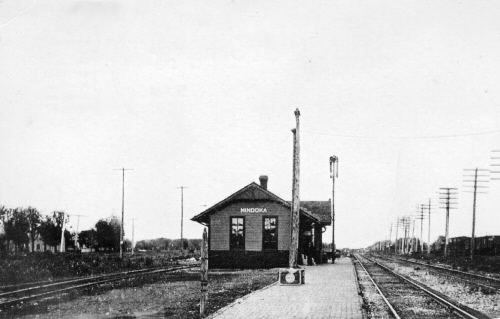
- The station

General information
- Location: Minooka, Illinois
- Coordinates: 41.45509°N 88.26066°W
- Owner: track owned by CSX Transportation
- Platforms: 1 side platform
- Tracks: 1

Construction
- Structure type: at-grade

History
- Opened: 1852
- Former names: Summit

Services
Preceding station	Chicago, Rock Island and Pacific Railroad	Following station
Former services
Morris toward Colorado Springs	Main Line	Bird's Bridge toward Chicago
Location

Minooka station was a Chicago, Rock Island and Pacific Railroad station in Minooka, Illinois. It was the highest point on the Rock Island Line and was originally called Summit. The town was later renamed by settler Dolly Smith, to Minooka, a word in the Pottowatomi language possibly meaning "high point", "place of contentment", "good Earth" or "place of the maples." Additional translations of the word may be "good land” or “high place.” CSX Transportation runs freight trains on the New Rock Subdivision with Iowa Interstate trackage rights.
