= 2024 Joliet shootings =

Spree shooting in Illinois, U.S.

- Joliet (Illinois) Joliet (the United States)
- Location: Joliet and Preston Heights, Illinois, United States
- Date: January 21, 2024; 2 years ago (CST)
- Attack type: Mass shooting, mass murder, spree shooting, , murder–suicide, matricide, drive-by shooting
- Weapons: Bushmaster XM-15 .223 caliber semi-automatic rifle; Springfield Armory XDS 9mm semi-automatic handgun; 9mm semi-automatic handgun
- Deaths: 9 (including the perpetrator)
- Injuries: 1
- Perpetrator: Romeo Alexander Nance

On January 21, 2024, a mass shooting occurred when a gunman opened fire at several different locations. The gunman, who was later identified as 23-year-old Romeo Nance, fatally shot eight people on three separate occasions across various locations in and around Joliet, Illinois. The perpetrator killed seven in two separate residences on West Acres Road, and killed one and wounded another in a seemingly random drive-by shooting spree. The gunman subsequently committed suicide a day later due to being confronted by law enforcement officials near Natalia, Texas.

== Shootings ==
1 Location of 200 Block shooting
2 Location of Pheasant Run shooting
3 Location of family murders

At around 4:15 pm CST, the perpetrator, Romeo Nance, drove by a 42-year-old man who was getting items out of his car in the 200 block of Davis Street in Joliet. Nance briefly stopped and the two exchanged words before Nance drove on. After the man crossed the street, Nance returned from the other direction and opened fire, striking the man in the leg before driving away.

Around 10 minutes later, the Will County Sheriff's Office responded to the Pheasant Run Apartments complex in Preston Heights, where officers discovered 28-year-old Toyosi Bakare with a gunshot wound to the head. Bakare was transported to a local hospital where he later died from his injuries.

Using surveillance footage from the shootings, the Sheriff's Office identified the perpetrator and vehicle, but was unable to locate either. Deputies then set up surveillance near Nance's home in the 2200 block of West Acres Road in Joliet at around midnight. After about 12 hours, deputies approached Nance's home, where they spotted blood outside and subsequently made entry. Inside, they found 47-year-old Tameaka Nance and 35-year-old William Esters II dead of gunshot wounds. Tameaka was the mother of the shooter, and William was the shooter's uncle. The Sheriff's Office then contacted the Joliet Police Department.

Officers checked a second house on the same block because it was inhabited by some of Nance's family members. Inside, they found 37-year-old Christine Esters, 31-year-old Joshua Nance, 20-year-old Alexandria Nance, 14-year-old Angel Nance, and 16-year-old Alonnah Nance all dead from gunshot wounds. Jon W. Hansen was interviewed by police in late January after the shootings and revealed that he was with Nance during at least two of the shootings. He said that Nance gave him the weapon he used to shoot one of the victims and that Hansen threw the gun into the nearby DuPage River. Authorities searched the river and found a loaded black Springfield Armory XDS pistol.

== Attempted escape and perpetrator ==
Nance then drove south to Texas, where police believe he stopped at a mall and acquired Texas license plates which he put onto his vehicle to throw authorities off his trail. At around 8:30 pm CST the following day, U.S. Marshals located Nance in Natalia. He was then confronted by police at a gas station just outside Natalia, and fatally shot himself with a handgun while engaging in a stand-off against them.

All of the victims, except the injured 42-year-old man and Bakare, were related to Nance, but police believed that Bakare was connected to Nance in some way. They also said that Nance had a criminal history but did not disclose what it entailed.

In 2018, Nance was charged with an armed robbery using a knife. In January 2023, he was arrested for allegedly opening fire on another driver during a road rage incident.

== Aftermath ==
Shortly after the shootings, Kyleigh Cleveland-Singleton, Nance's girlfriend, was arrested and charged with felony obstruction of justice. Judge David Carlson ordered that she be placed on home confinement until further notice. On February 9, 2024, she pled not guilty to the charge.

On May 31, 2024, 24-year-old Jon Hansen, of Shorewood, Illinois, was arrested on three counts of murder, attempted first-degree murder and aggravated battery with a firearm. He is accused of being with Nance during both of the shootings in the Joliet area and throwing the gun that was used in the DuPage River near his home.
