= Briscoe Mounds =

Archaeological site in Illinois, United States

- U.S. National Register of Historic Places
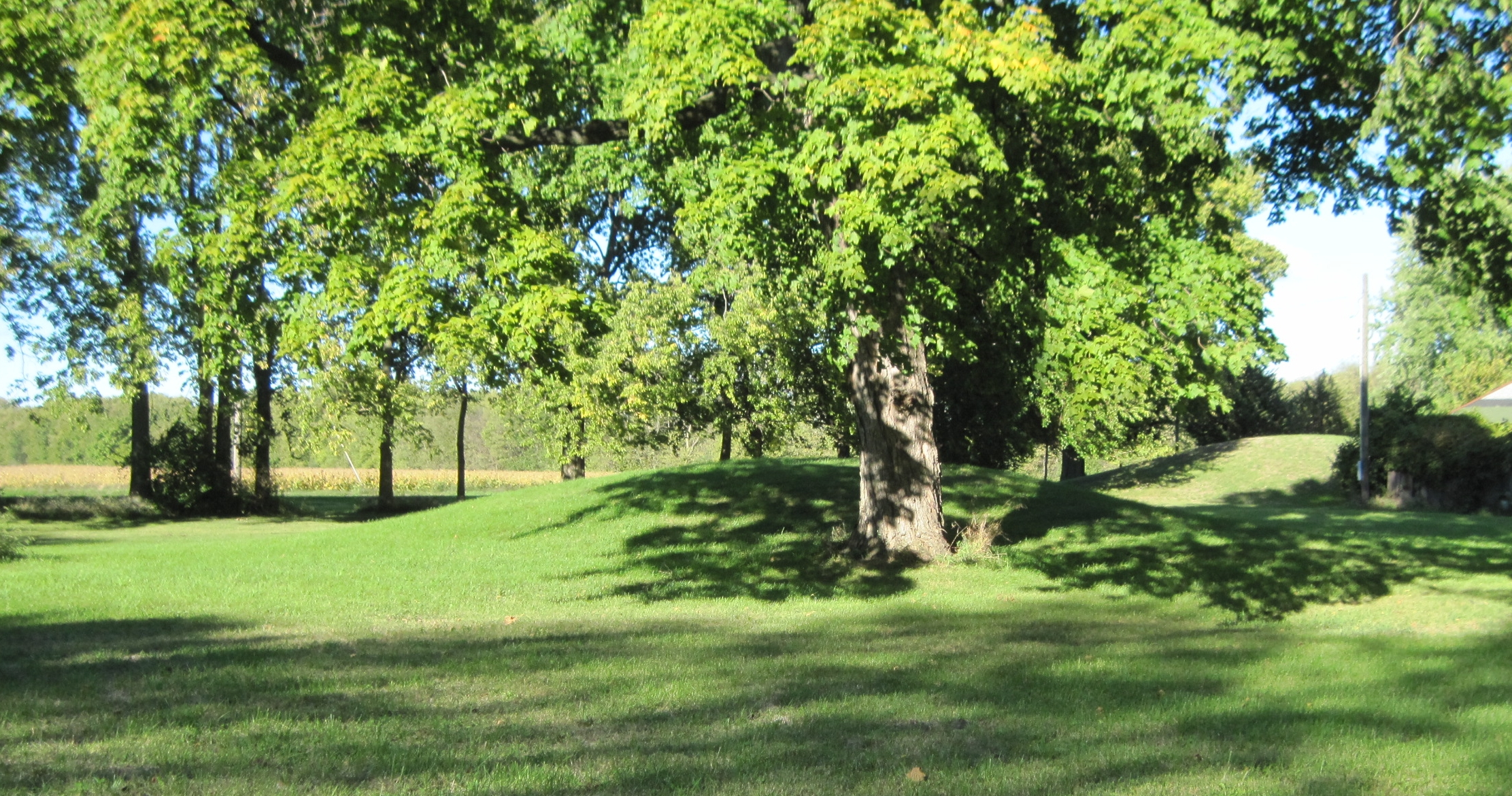

- Location within Illinois Location within the United States
- Location: Front Street; Channahon, Will County, Illinois, U.S.
- Coordinates: 41°25′10.2″N 88°13′13.1″W
- NRHP reference No.: 78001198
- Added to NRHP: December 22, 1978

The Briscoe Mounds, officially Illinois Archaeological Survey No. Wi-25, is an archaeological site in Channahon, Illinois. The mound site is located along the north edge of the Des Plaines River and is the largest mound site in northern Illinois.

The site takes its name from the Briscoe family, who owned the property until selling it to the state. Briscoe Mounds is now owned by the Illinois State Museum, who plan on building a visitor center in the future.

The two mounds on the site were built between 1200 and 1500 AD in the Mississippian Period. The first survey of the mounds was in 1938; a later survey in 1940 revealed nine distinctive pieces of pottery. The mounds were excavated in 1964, revealing sixteen bodies. The mounds were added to the National Register of Historic Places in 1978.

== See also ==
- Mound
- Mound builder (people)
- Earthwork (archaeology)
- List of archaeological sites on the National Register of Historic Places in Illinois
