= Nathaniel Code =

American serial killer (born 1956)

- Code in 1987
- Born: Nathaniel Robert Code Jr. March 12, 1956 (age 70); Shreveport, Louisiana, U.S.
- Other names: "Junior" "The Cedar Grove Killer" "Shreveport Serial Killer" "Nathaniel The Terrible"
- Status: Incarcerated
- Convictions: First degree murder (4 counts); Attempted aggravated rape
- Penalty: Death

Details
- Victims: 8–12
- Span of crimes: 1984–1987
- Country: United States
- State: Louisiana
- Date apprehended: August 6, 1987
- Imprisoned at: Louisiana State Penitentiary

Nathaniel Robert Code Jr. (born March 12, 1956) is an American serial killer and mass murderer who murdered eight people at their residences in Shreveport, Louisiana, between 1984 and 1987. He is perhaps best known for killing four members of the Cheney-Culbert family in the neighborhood of Cedar Grove in 1985. Tried for only those murders, he was found guilty and sentenced to death in 1990.

== Early life ==
Nathaniel Robert Code Jr. was born on March 12, 1956. His parents divorced only six months later and his great-aunt Josephine Code and grandfather William T. Code raised him. As a child, Code, who was nicknamed Junior, was noted for his tendencies to stop in the middle of a sentence and stare blankly for a while before continuing. He was alleged to have set fire to animals during his adolescence. After failing ninth-grade, Code dropped out of high school. He began living with his uncle Johnny Boyd shortly after. In 1971, Code was shot four times by Boyd after an argument. Code was able to run four blocks down where he collapsed on the street, and soon after, two patrolmen found him. Code told officers that Boyd, whom he knew as "Uncle Joe," had done it. Boyd was later arrested.

In July 1975, Code was charged with aggravated rape and burglary in connection with the assault of a 20-year-old woman on June 30. He pleaded guilty to attempted aggravated rape in November 1975 and was sentenced to 15 years in prison. While incarcerated, his birth mother died. Code was released on good behavior in January 1984 and began work at Fitzgerald's Contractors, but after a 1985 incident where he attacked a co-worker over a radio-station dispute, Code was fired. On February 3, 1986, he married 27-year-old Vera Code.

== Murders ==
During the night of August 31, 1984, Code entered the home of 25-year-old Debra Ann Ford by pulling open a screen on the bathroom window. After a confrontation in the living room, Code bound Ford's hands and placed a gag on her mouth, then stabbed her multiple times and slit her throat. Ford died as a result of her injuries. Code then fled through the front door. Her body was laying face-down in a sofa. At the time, investigators described the case as "a regular whodunnit." With minimal evidence to pinpoint the perpetrator, a reward of $1,000 was put forward for information leading to an arrest. Code remained elusive.

A crowd gathers around a Cedar Grove home where four bodies were found, July 1985

In the early hours of July 19, 1985, Code committed a mass murder on 72nd Street on Cedar Grove. He killed Vivian Chaney, 34; Billy Joe Harris, 28; Carlitha Culbert, 15; and Jerry Culbert, 25, with what was described as extreme brutality. Billy Joe Harris was shot twice in the head, and twice in the chest, through a pillow. His throat was then slashed and his hands and ankles were bound with shoelaces. Jerry Culbert was shot once in the head while sleeping. Carlitha Culbert was found lying on her stomach, with her hands bound behind her back with an electrical cord from an iron. Her mouth was gagged with duct tape and her shorts were on inside out. Her throat was cut so severely that she was nearly decapitated. Vivian Chaney was found slumped over a bathtub with her hands and ankles bound with a telephone cord. She was beaten and strangled, both manually and with a ligature. Her cause of death was determined to be a combination of manual strangulation and drowning. Her dress contained a large amount of Carlitha Culbert's blood, indicating she was alive and present during her daughter's death. Two other girls in the home at the time, aged 7 and 10, survived. The bodies were discovered at 6:25 a.m. by a relative, Shirley Culbert, who had taken a taxi from a nearby bus station. Police were notified by the taxi driver.

Assistant police chief Sam Burns described the murders by saying, "I don't know that I've seen anything more vicious in the 25 years I've been in the department." According to retired FBI profiler John E. Douglas, the murders of Debra Ann Ford and Carlitha Culbert showed striking similarities, in his words "manipulation, domination, and control of the victims—a calling card. If one occurred in Shreveport and one in Baton Rouge, I wouldn't hesitate. There's no doubt that the same person was responsible for both sets of murders."

On August 5, 1987, Code beat and stabbed his grandfather, 73-year-old William Code, to death. He had stabbed him 13 times and had bound and gagged him. Code also killed two children that were present in the home, 12-year-old Joe Robinson Jr. and 8-year-old Eric Williams. Both boys were bound, gagged, and strangled to death with a cord. Police noted that the brutality of the attack had made them speculate if it was committed by someone close to William.

Code is also suspected, but not confirmed, to have been the killer in the murders of Wes Burks, 48, and Monica Barnum, 20; Burks was killed on June 24, 1985, while Barnum was killed just under a month later on July 18. Code is also suspected in the 1986 murders of Johnny Jenkins, 54, and Jake Mills, 60; Jenkins' body was found at 4115 Miles St. on February 21, 1986, while Mills' body was found at 1549 Poland Ave on December 12, 1986. Code was never officially linked to these killings, and none of his known murders occurred in 1986, the year he was married.

== Arrest ==
Following the last murders, an investigative team interviewed Code at the police station. At the time, he was only a routine suspect because of his relations with one of the victims. According to the authorities, Code made an incriminating statement in the interview while also denying involvement. Code's fingerprints were collected and were matched to evidence found at the scene, and he was arrested. Following his arrest, another fingerprint sample matched a sample collected at the 1985 murders on Cedar Grove, proving his guilt in those killings beyond a reasonable doubt. Finally, with John Douglas' information that modus operandi was the same to Debra Ford's murder, Code's fingerprints were compared, and they matched as well.

Following his arrest, family members and acquaintances of Code came forward with their disbelief that Code was a serial killer. L.C. Thomas, the co-worker whom Code had attacked in 1985, described Code as quick-tempered, while his wife described him as a good, caring man who would never hurt anyone and insisted on his innocence. In total, Code faced eight-counts of first-degree murder. Code denied killing anyone.

== Trial ==
Code was tried only for the murders of the Chaney/Culbert family. The trial began in September 1990. According to prosecutors, Code had stalked each of his victims at night while riding on his bike.

An acquaintance of Code, Oscar Washington, took the stand in late September and testified that he saw Code with blood on his arms between 2 a.m. and 3 a.m. on July 19, 1985. He also claimed that Code had told him he had gotten into a fight and "came out on top". Although on trial for four murders, the prosecution brought up the coroner, who described all of Code's murders, saying that they were all "methodical, controlling, and brutal." Code chose not to take the stand, but his defense presented evidence that Code could not have committed the murders, due to the fact it would take more than one person to kill four people at the same time. They also argued that, if he were to be found guilty, Code should not be sentenced to death due to him having several mental problems, including borderline personality disorder.

By the end of the trial, more than 450 pieces of evidence had been presented, with 106 witnesses having taken the stand. The jury of five men and seven women took only one hour to find Code guilty of four first-degree murder charges. He was sentenced to death.

== Incarceration ==
In July 1991 Code filed an appeal, in which he alleged that he had been overwhelmed during the trial which caused him to make bad legal decisions. He also continually denied committing the murders, contesting that he could not have murdered four people at the same time. His death sentence was upheld by the Louisiana Supreme Court. In August 1994, a Shreveport judge scheduled Code to be executed by lethal injection on September 29 that year. However, due to Code planning to appeal to a federal court, the execution had to be postponed. A new execution date was set for May 15, 1995, but it was delayed once again by a District Judge, who agreed to review documents in the case.

In 2013, Code was one of three inmates at Louisiana State Penitentiary to file lawsuits against the extremely hot temperatures in prison. According to them, they would suffer extreme heat, as high as 195-degree with the heat index in the summer, and said it was a risk of serious harm or death. Family members of Code's victims expressed their extreme rejections toward the request, mentioning what he did to put himself on death row. According to Albert Culbert Jr., the brother of Carlitha Culbert, "He lost all those privileges that you and I have. He lost that air conditioning privilege. He lost that. The Culberts, we didn't put him on death row. He did that when he decided to take my sister's life and my brother, my niece, Billy Joe Harris, Deborah Ford, Mr. William, and the other two little boys. He did that. And now he's got nerve enough..."

== See also ==
- Danny Rolling, another serial killer from Shreveport with eight victims
- List of death row inmates in the United States
- List of serial killers in the United States

== Bibliography ==
- Robert Keppel (November 6, 2007). Signature Killers. Gallery Books. ISBN 978-1416585794.
