= Shorewood-Troy Public Library =

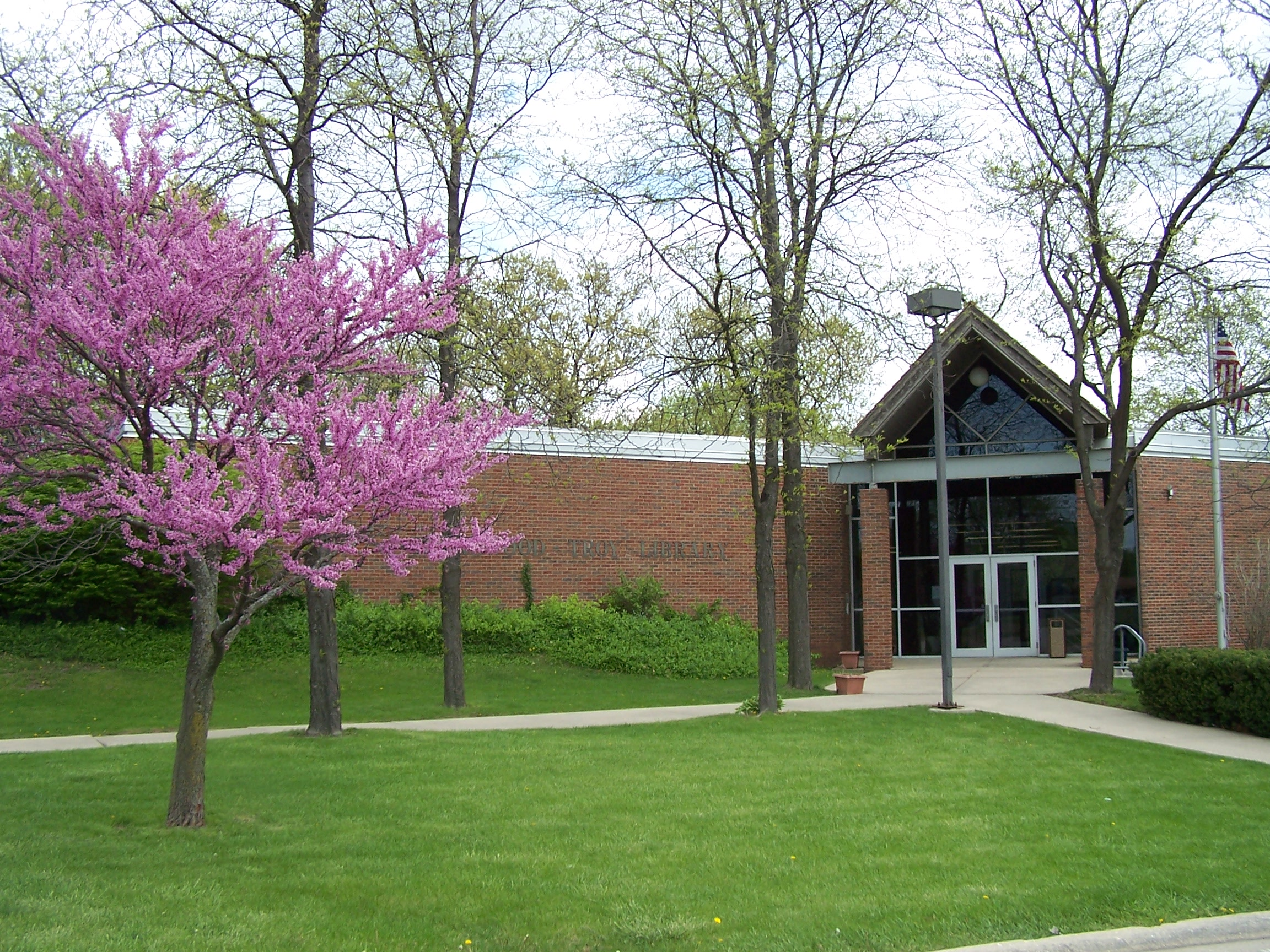
- Shorewood-Troy Public Library
- 41.52407°N 88.20472°W
- Location: 650 Deerwood Dr, Shorewood, Illinois, United States of America
- Type: Public library
- Established: November 17, 1975

Collection
- Size: 41,523

Access and use
- Circulation: 171,930
- Population served: 19,235

Other information
- Website: https://www.shorewoodtroylibrary.org

The Shorewood-Troy Public Library serves the village of Shorewood, Illinois and its surrounding areas. The library is near the intersection of U.S. Route 52 and Illinois Route 59.

== Library statistics ==
FY2021 Information
Population served: 19,235
Circulation: 171,930

== History ==
On Monday, November 17, 1975, the Shorewood-Troy Township Library opened its doors to residents of Shorewood. The original building was a storefront in the Shorewood Plaza on US Route 52, containing over 2,000 books, magazines, cassettes and records. Originally part of the Burr Oak Library System, residents had been using the Burr Oak bookmobile as their library service since 1972.

Originally labeled as a “demonstration library”, the storefront library operated under federal grants for several years. In May 1976, the Shorewood-Troy Library District was formed, after a referendum passed establishing a library board and new tax rates.

By 1980, the community of Shorewood was outgrowing its small storefront library, so the search for a new site began. In June 1984, a library construction grant of $250,000 was awarded to the district. Land was donated just north of the Shorewood Plaza by George and William Michas and Chris Dragatsis for the new building. The official ground-breaking of the new 15,000-square-foot (1,400 m^{2}) facility was August 16, 1984. The Shorewood-Troy Public Library opened to the public the following year. In 1992–93, a lower level of the library was completed to house the Youth Services Department and a meeting room.
