= Morris station =

Coordinates: 41.36401°N 88.42326°W

Morris
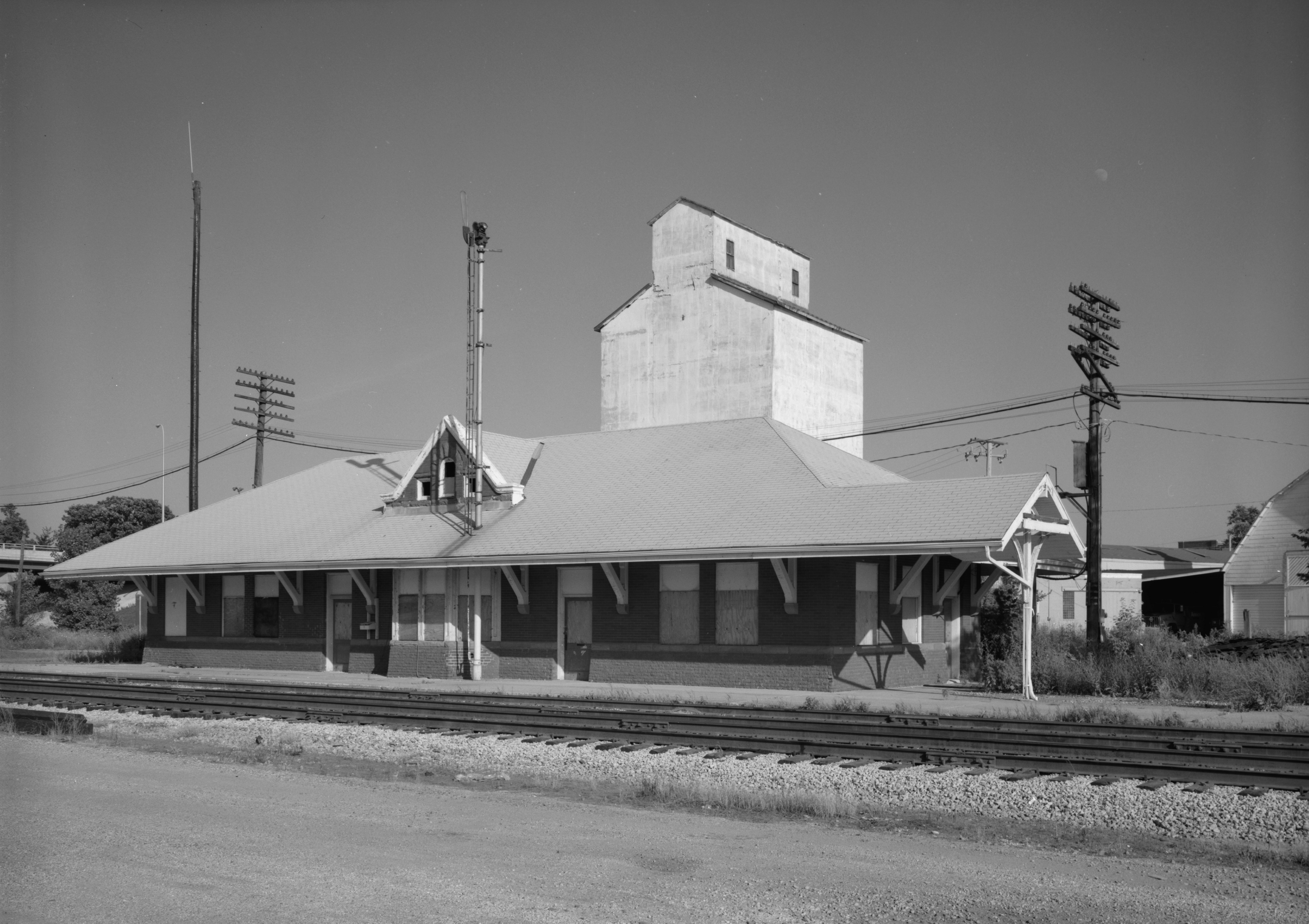
- Morris station in 1986.

General information
- Location: Near IL 47; Morris, Illinois
- System: Former Rock Island Line passenger rail station
- Owner: track owned by CSX Transportation
- Platforms: 1 side platform
- Tracks: 1

History
- Opened: 1900

Services
Preceding station	Chicago, Rock Island and Pacific Railroad	Following station
Former services
Stockdale toward Colorado Springs	Main Line	Minooka toward Chicago
Location

Morris station was a Chicago, Rock Island and Pacific Railway station in Morris, Illinois. Unlike many old stations, the depot is still standing on the south side of the track just west of Route 47. The tracks were built by the Rock Island Line in 1853. The single track line is now on the CSX New Rock Subdivision. Across the tracks is the former Illinois Terminal Railway station house, now used as a business. The station is considered for service on Amtrak's proposed Chicago—Moline—Iowa City line. There is speculation that Metra's Rock Island District will be extended to Morris.
