= Troy Township, Illinois =

Coordinates: 41°30′27″N 88°11′48″W

Troy Township
- Township
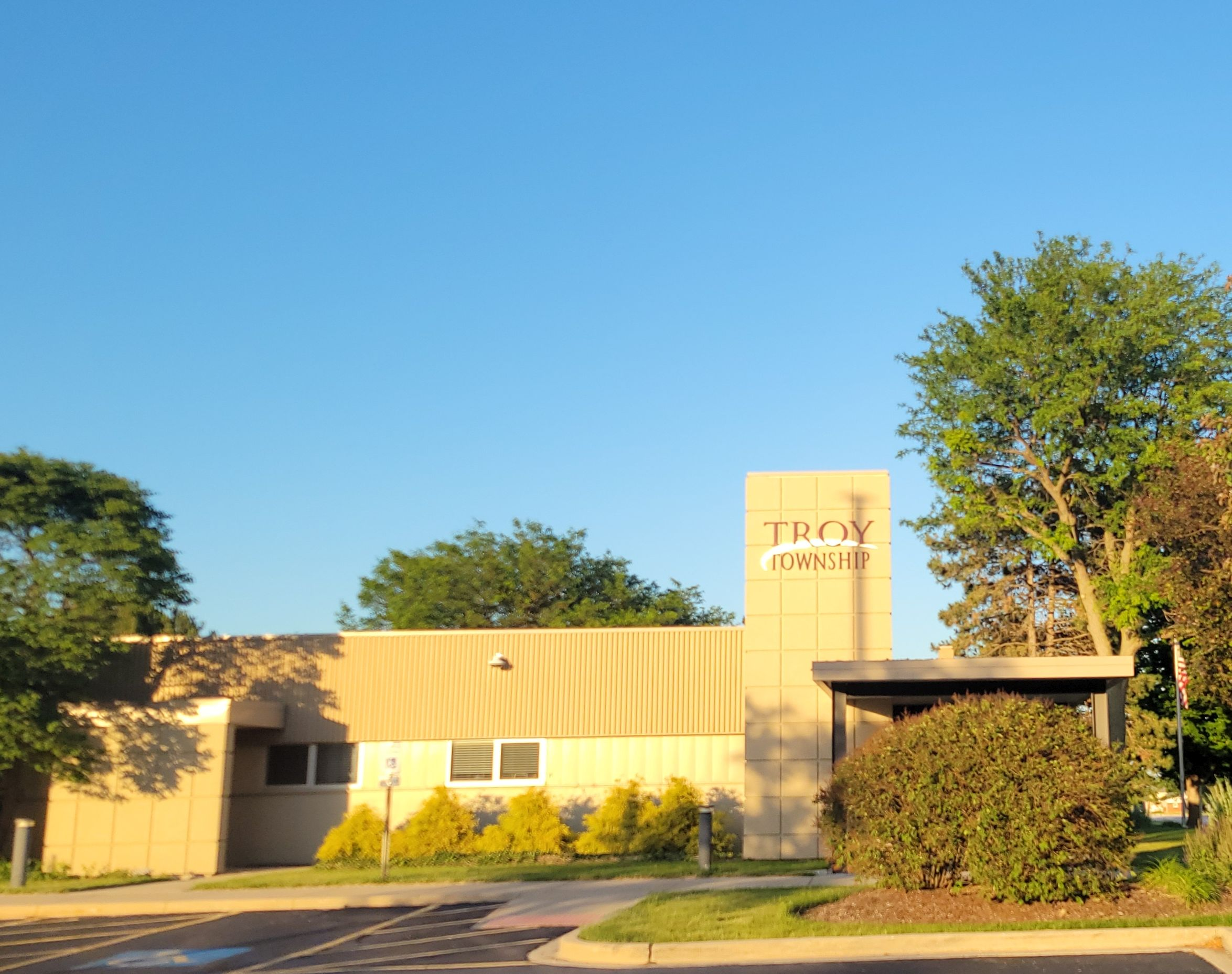
- Troy Township offices and community center in Shorewood

- Location in Will County
- Country: United States
- State: Illinois
- County: Will
- Established: November 6, 1849

Area
  - Total: 35.38 sq mi (91.6 km^{2})
  - Land: 34.75 sq mi (90.0 km^{2})
  - Water: 0.63 sq mi (1.6 km^{2}) 1.78%

Population (2010)
  - Estimate (2016): 47,447
  - Density: 1,323.5/sq mi (511.0/km^{2})
- Time zone: UTC-6 (CST)
  - Summer (DST): UTC-5 (CDT)
- FIPS code: 17-197-76212

Troy Township is located in Will County, Illinois. As of the 2010 census, its population was 45,991 and it contained 17,522 housing units. It contains the western edge of the city of Joliet and the entirety of the village of Shorewood.

== Geography ==
According to the 2010 census, the township has a total area of 35.38 square miles (91.6 km^{2}), of which 34.75 square miles (90.0 km^{2}) (or 98.22%) is land and 0.63 square miles (1.6 km^{2}) (or 1.78%) is water.

== Demographics ==
Historical population
Census	Pop.	Note	%±
2016 (est.)	47,447
U.S. Decennial Census
