= Minooka Community High School =

High school in Illinois, United States

Location
- 301 S. Wabena Avenue; Minooka, Illinois; United States; 41.408396°N 88.248187°W

Information
- Type: Public high school
- NCES District ID: 1726340
- Superintendent: Robert Schiffbauer
- Principal: Jamie Soliman
- Teaching staff: 166.94 (FTE)
- Grades: 9–12
- Enrollment: 2,985 (2023-2024)
- Student to teacher ratio: 17.88
- Colors: Orange, black, and white
- Mascot: Indians
- Website: www.mchs.net

Minooka Community High School, or MCHS, is a public four-year high school located in Minooka, Illinois. It is the only high school in Minooka CHSD 111.

== History ==
In April 2025, MCHS began an $82 million expansion for a new Career Technical Education wing at the Central Campus and a new Fieldhouse at the South Campus. It will total a debt of $52 million, expected to be paid off by 2032. Additionally, $200,000 will be spent to improve the parking lots.

== Central Campus ==
Outside of transfers, students come to Minooka Community High School from three feeder school districts: Minooka Community Consolidated School District 201, Channahon School District 17, and Troy Community Consolidated School District 30-C.

Several additions have been made to the building over the years. The first addition added hallways to the ends of the existing hallways to create two square hallways coming off of the main walkways. With that addition in the 1990s, Minooka added more technology and classroom space. Next came the new physical education department space that has been added in the early 2000s. This addition created more room for PE classes, along with drivers' ed classrooms and more. The other big addition that same year was building a new lunch room, the Cafetorium. This glass panel, rounded room, is the location of lunch, after school programs, athletic practices, concerts, musicals & plays, and the homecoming dance.

== South campus ==
This addition was created in the mid-2000s and was opened for the first time for the 2008–2009 school year. It currently serves as a freshman or sophomore campus while the original building is a junior/senior campus.

== Academics ==
In 2006, Minooka had an average composite ACT score of 20.8, and graduated 97.6% of its senior class. The average class size was 21.7. Minooka offers many elective options for students in every subject and vocational area.

== Notable alumni ==
- Chris Başak, Major League Baseball player
- Mike Foltynewicz, Major League Baseball pitcher
- Nate George, baseball outfielder
- Nick Offerman, actor
