= Cedar Grove, Shreveport, Louisiana =

Neighborhood in Louisiana

Coordinates: 32.439°N 93.752°W

Cedar Grove (French: Bosquet de Cèdre) is a neighborhood within the confines of Shreveport, Louisiana. It is located to the southwest of the downtown district, an area bordered by Hollywood Avenue on the north side to 85th Street on the south side; from Line Avenue in the east to Linwood Road on the west. It developed a recent reputation as an inner city neighborhood, especially during the crack cocaine epidemic of the 1980s.

Cedar Grove has a much longer distinction as home to working class gin joints, brothels, and illegal gambling as far back as the 1930s. One such club, the Woodlawn Club, was notorious for such activities and is reported to have hosted such big band names as Tommy Dorsey and Rudy Vallée during its heyday. In May 2007, rapper Hurricane Chris shot a music video for his song "A Bay Bay" there. Cedar Grove is also home to Lava House Records, which hosts many of Shreveport's musical artists.

== 1988 riot ==
In September 1988, a riot compelled the police to block off the entire neighborhood. Cars and businesses were burned. The rioting continued for two days. It stemmed from an incident in which a white woman shot at an African American man when a drug deal failed.

== Notable residents ==
- Nathaniel Code
- Tillman Franks
