= Socrum, Florida =

Unincorporated community in Florida, U.S.

Coordinates: 28°10′05″N 82°01′08″W

Socrum is an unincorporated community in Polk County, in the U.S. state of Florida. It was located north of Lakeland.

== History ==
A post office called Socrum was established in 1907, and remained in operation until 1918. According to tradition, the name is a contraction of "soak 'em", on account of the marshy town site. An alternate derivation is a conjunction of "soak & rum", as early settlers would keep barrels of rum both relatively cool and safe from native populations by immersing said barrels in "Indian Lake" - a small lake at 28° 09.89" N, 82° 00.54" W as part of modern-day Bethel Baptist Church near the corner of North Socrum Loop Road and North Campbell Road
