= Shorewood, Illinois =

Shorewood
- Village
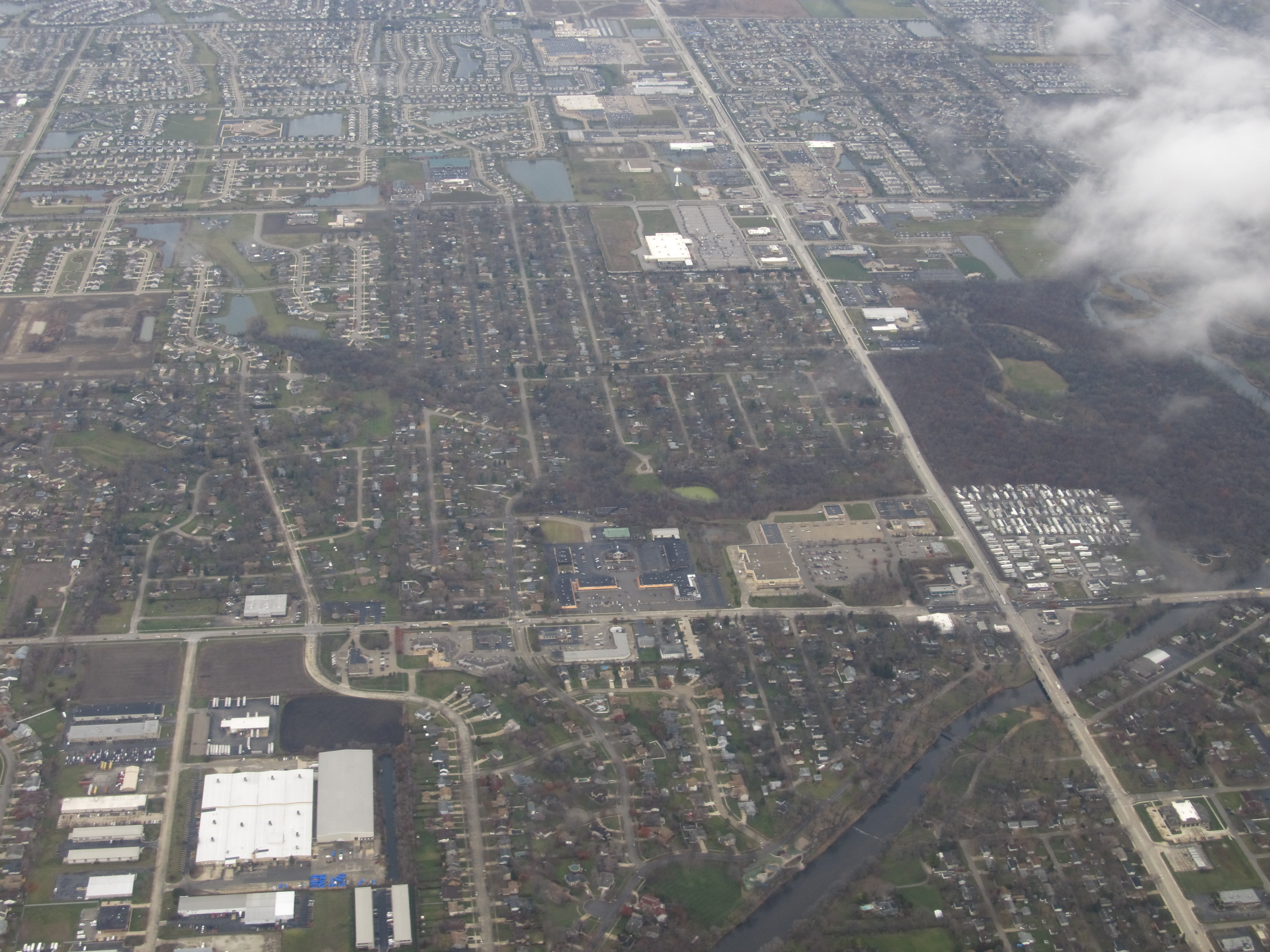
- 2013 aerial photograph of Shorewood

- Location of Shorewood in Will County, Illinois.

- Location of Illinois in the United States
- Coordinates: 41°31′6″N 88°12′54″W
- Country: United States
- State: Illinois
- County: Will
- Township: Troy
- Settled: 1830
- Incorporated: November 27, 1957

Government
  - Village President: Clarence “CC” DeBold

Area
  - Total: 8.20 sq mi (21.23 km^{2})
  - Land: 8.08 sq mi (20.94 km^{2})
  - Water: 0.11 sq mi (0.29 km^{2})
- Elevation: 620 ft (190 m)

Population (2020)
  - Total: 18,186
  - Density: 2,249.4/sq mi (868.49/km^{2})
- Time zone: UTC-6 (CST)
  - Summer (DST): UTC-5 (CDT)
- ZIP Code(s): 60404
- Area codes: 815, 779
- FIPS code: 17-69758
- Wikimedia Commons: Shorewood, Illinois
- Website: Village of Shorewood

Shorewood is a village in Troy Township, Will County, Illinois, United States. The population was 18,182 in the 2020 census, and is estimated to be 18,360 in 2024.

== Geography ==
Shorewood is located at 41°31′6″N 88°12′54″W (41.5181961, -88.2150390). The village is approximately 39 miles (63 km) southwest of Chicago's Loop.

According to the 2020 census, Shorewood has a total area of 8.07 square miles (20.90 km^{2}), of which 7.77 square miles (20.12 km^{2}) (or 98.55%) is land and 0.114 square miles (0.30 km^{2}) (or 1.45%) is water.

== Demographics ==
Historical population
Census	Pop.	Note	%±
1960	499		—
1970	1,749		250.5%
1980	4,714		169.5%
1990	6,264		32.9%
2000	7,686		22.7%
2010	15,615		103.2%
2020	18,186		16.5%
U.S. Decennial Census

=== Racial and ethnic composition ===
Shorewood village, Illinois – Racial and ethnic composition Note: the US Census treats Hispanic/Latino as an ethnic category. This table excludes Latinos from the racial categories and assigns them to a separate category. Hispanics/Latinos may be of any race.
Race / Ethnicity (NH = Non-Hispanic)	Pop 2000	Pop 2010	Pop 2020	% 2000	% 2010	% 2020
White alone (NH)	6,979	12,614	13,391	90.80%	80.78%	73.63%
Black or African American alone (NH)	180	813	1,155	2.34%	5.21%	6.35%
Native American or Alaska Native alone (NH)	11	17	7	0.14%	0.11%	0.04%
Asian alone (NH)	102	267	516	1.33%	1.71%	2.84%
Native Hawaiian or Pacific Islander alone (NH)	1	7	0	0.01%	0.04%	0.00%
Other race alone (NH)	3	16	56	0.04%	0.10%	0.31%
Mixed race or Multiracial (NH)	69	200	600	0.90%	1.28%	3.30%
Hispanic or Latino (any race)	341	1,681	2,461	4.44%	10.77%	13.53%
Total	7,686	15,615	18,186	100.00%	100.00%	100.00%

=== 2020 census ===
As of the 2020 census, Shorewood had a population of 18,186. The median age was 42.3 years. 23.6% of residents were under the age of 18 and 19.3% of residents were 65 years of age or older. For every 100 females, there were 94.3 males, and for every 100 females age 18 and over, there were 92.3 males.

100.0% of residents lived in urban areas, while 0.0% lived in rural areas.

There were 6,566 households in Shorewood, of which 33.8% had children under the age of 18 living in them. Of all households, 63.8% were married-couple households, 11.3% were households with a male householder and no spouse or partner present, and 19.9% were households with a female householder and no spouse or partner present. About 19.8% of all households were made up of individuals and 11.6% had someone living alone who was 65 years of age or older.

There were 6,807 housing units, of which 3.5% were vacant. The homeowner vacancy rate was 1.0% and the rental vacancy rate was 8.1%.

=== 2010 census ===
As of the census of 2010, there were 15,610 residents, with 2,146 families residing in the village. The population density was 2,008.9 people per square mile (762.9/km^{2}). There were 2,647 housing units at an average density of 680.9 per square mile (262.9/km^{2}). The racial makeup of the village was 92.71% White, 2.39% African American, 0.27% Native American, 1.33% Asian, 0.01% Pacific Islander, 1.98% from other races, and 1.30% from two or more races. Hispanic or Latino of any race were 4.44% of the population.

There were 2,565 households, out of which 43.5% had children under the age of 18 living with them, 73.2% were married couples living together, 7.3% had a female householder with no husband present, and 16.3% were non-families. 13.5% of all households were made up of individuals, and 3.4% had someone living alone who was 65 years of age or older. The average household size was 3.00 and the average family size was 3.30.

In the village, the population was spread out, with 29.8% under the age of 18, 6.8% from 18 to 24, 30.4% from 25 to 44, 26.8% from 45 to 64, and 6.1% who were 65 years of age or older. The median age was 36 years. For every 100 females, there were 99.7 males. For every 100 females age 18 and over, there were 96.0 males.

The median income for a household in the village was $89,095. Males had a median income of $56,935 versus $42,336 for females. The per capita income for the village was $38,199. About 1.1% of families and 2.0% of the population were below the poverty line, including 0.6% of those under age 18 and none of those age 65 or over. Median value of owner-occupied housing units in 2006-2010 is $248,100.

== Culture ==
Shorewood has one library, Shorewood-Troy Public Library.

== Transportation ==
Pace provides bus service on Route 501 connecting Shorewood to downtown Joliet and other destinations.

== Notable people ==
- Tanner Laczynski, professional ice hockey player for the Philadelphia Flyers
- Eric Parker, wide receiver with the San Diego Chargers
