= Channahon Township, Illinois =

Coordinates: 41°25′07″N 88°11′36″W

Channahon Township
- Township
- Location in Will County
- Country: United States
- State: Illinois
- County: Will
- Established: November 6, 1849

Area
  - Total: 35.49 sq mi (91.93 km^{2})
  - Land: 33.22 sq mi (86.05 km^{2})
  - Water: 2.27 sq mi (5.87 km^{2}) 6.39%

Population (2020)
  - Total: 10,519
  - Density: 316/sq mi (122.2/km^{2})
- Time zone: UTC-6 (CST)
  - Summer (DST): UTC-5 (CDT)
- FIPS code: 17-197-12483

Channahon Township is located in Will County, Illinois. As of the 2020 census, its population was 10,519 and it contained 3,720 housing units.

== Geography ==
According to the 2020 census, the township has a total area of 35.49 square miles (91.93 km^{2}), of which 33.23 square miles (86.05 km^{2}) (or 93.61%) is land and 2.27 square miles (5.87 km^{2}) (or 6.39%) is water.

== Demographics ==
Historical population
Census	Pop.	Note	%±
2000	8,247		—
2010	10,322		25.2%
2020	10,519		1.9%
U.S. Decennial Census
