= Pullman National Historical Park =

Historic district in Chicago, Illinois

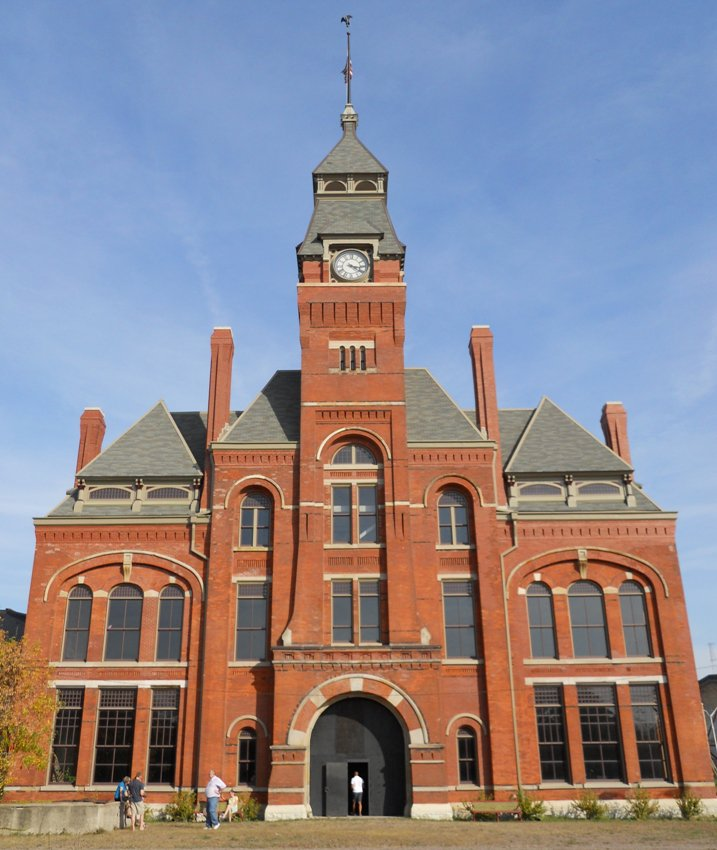
- Former Administration Building

- Location in Chicago Pullman National Historical Park (Illinois) Pullman National Historical Park (the United States)
- 41°41′50″N 87°36′34″W
- Location: Chicago, Illinois, United States

History
- Built: Construction begun in 1880

Site notes
- Area: 0.4 acres (0.16 ha)
- Architect(s): Solon Spencer Beman and Nathan F. Barrett
- Architectural styles: Queen Anne, Gothic Revival
- Governing body: U.S. National Park Service
- Visitors: 22,367 (in 2025)
- Website: Pullman National Historical Park

U.S. National Monument
- Designated: February 19, 2015

U.S. National Register of Historic Places
- Official name: Pullman Historic District
- Designated: October 8, 1969
- Reference no.: 69000054

U.S. National Historic Landmark District
- Designated: December 30, 1970

Illinois State Historic Site

Chicago Landmark
- Designated: October 16, 1972

Pullman National Historical Park is a historic district located in Chicago, Illinois, which in the 19th century was the first model, planned industrial community in the United States. The district had its origins in the manufacturing plans and organization of the Pullman Company and became one of the most well-known company towns in the United States, as well as the scene of the violent 1894 Pullman strike. It was built for George Pullman as a place to produce the Pullman railroad-sleeping cars.

Originally built beyond the Chicago city limits, it is in the Pullman community area of Chicago. The district includes the Pullman administration buildings and the company's Hotel Florence, named after George Pullman's daughter, as well as housing originally built for workers and managers. Also within the district is the A. Philip Randolph Pullman Porter Museum, named for the prominent labor and civil rights leader A. Philip Randolph, which recognizes and explores African American labor history. Parts of the site were acquired by the Illinois Historic Preservation Agency prior to being gifted to the federal government. Additional grounds remain owned by the state, as the Pullman State Historic Site. The Pullman District, including the national historical park, state historic site, and private homes is east of Cottage Grove Avenue, from East 103rd St. to East 115th St. It was named a Chicago Landmark district on October 16, 1972. It was listed on the National Register of Historic Places on October 8, 1969 and declared a National Historic Landmark on December 30, 1970.

Preservationists had hoped to extend the district to include Schlitz Row, but the taverns located there have been demolished. President Barack Obama named the site a national monument on February 19, 2015, making it a component of the National Park System. It was redesignated a National Historical Park in 2022. In celebration of the 2018 Illinois Bicentennial, Pullman was selected as one of the Illinois 200 Great Places by the American Institute of Architects Illinois component and was recognized by USA Today Travel magazine as one of AIA Illinois's selections for Illinois 25 Must See Places.

== Background ==
George Pullman was born in Brocton, New York and studied engineering. By the 1850s, Chicago was emerging as a major city, but faced sanitation issues. Pullman designed a method to raise buildings, which allowed better drainage. This innovation led Pullman to great financial success. With this new-found wealth, Pullman founded the Pullman Palace Car Company to manufacture sleeping cars in 1867. Through a focus on luxury and customer comfort, Pullman gained a large market share in the railroad car sector. The expensive cars were typically rented out to railroads with trained employees, many of whom were former house slaves recently freed by the Emancipation Proclamation.

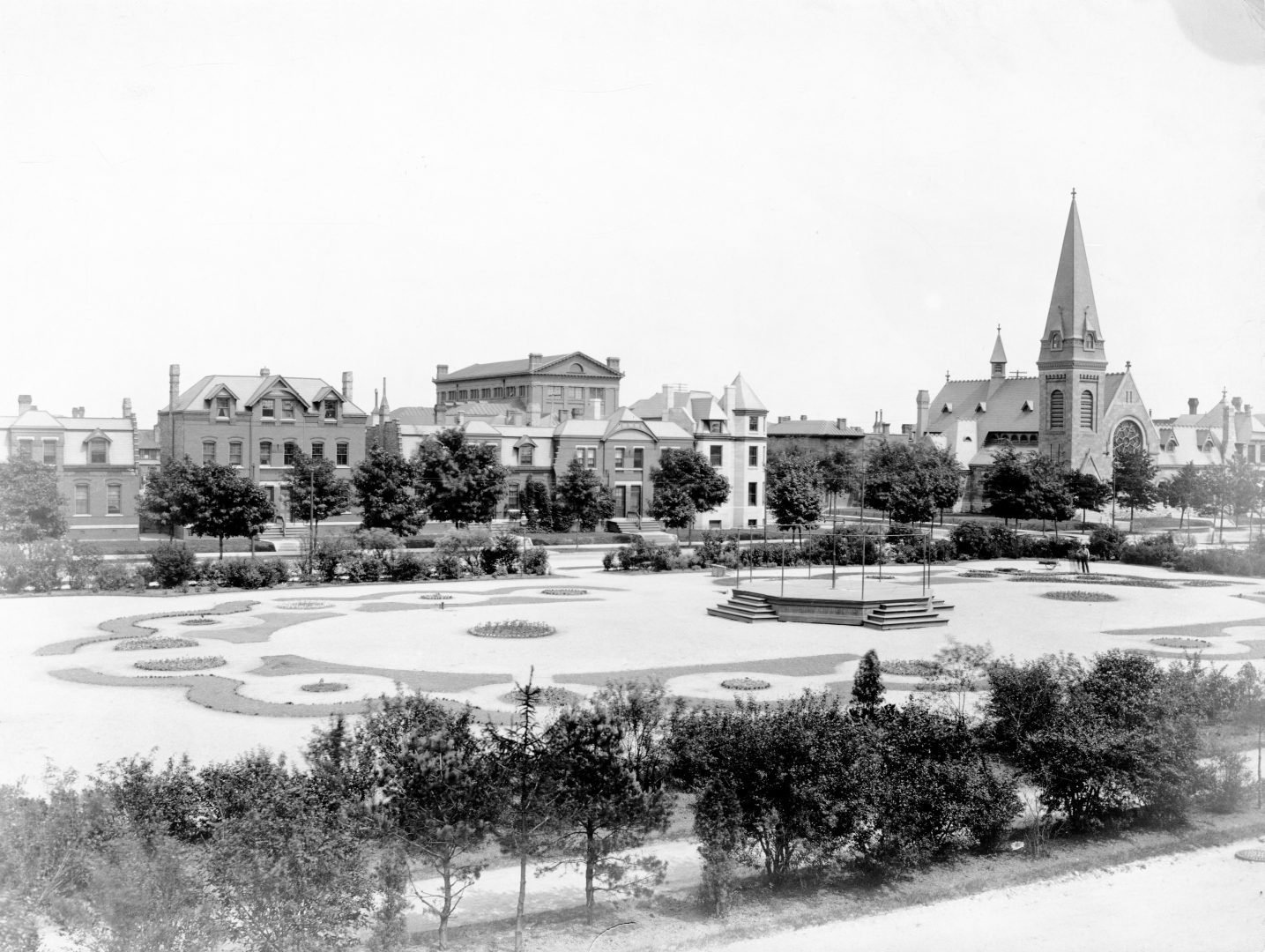
Pullman company town c. 1880

Pullman was an early advocate of employee welfare in a city that was a hotbed for labor unrest in the 1870s. When a new factory was required to meet demand, Pullman was presented with an opportunity to integrate employee betterment with manufacturing efficiency. As land values were skyrocketing in the city proper, Pullman purchased 4,000 acres (1,600 ha) south of Chicago, between the Illinois Central Railroad line and Lake Calumet. He organized the Pullman Land Association to oversee non-manufacturing real estate and transferred all but 500 acres (200 ha) to its control.

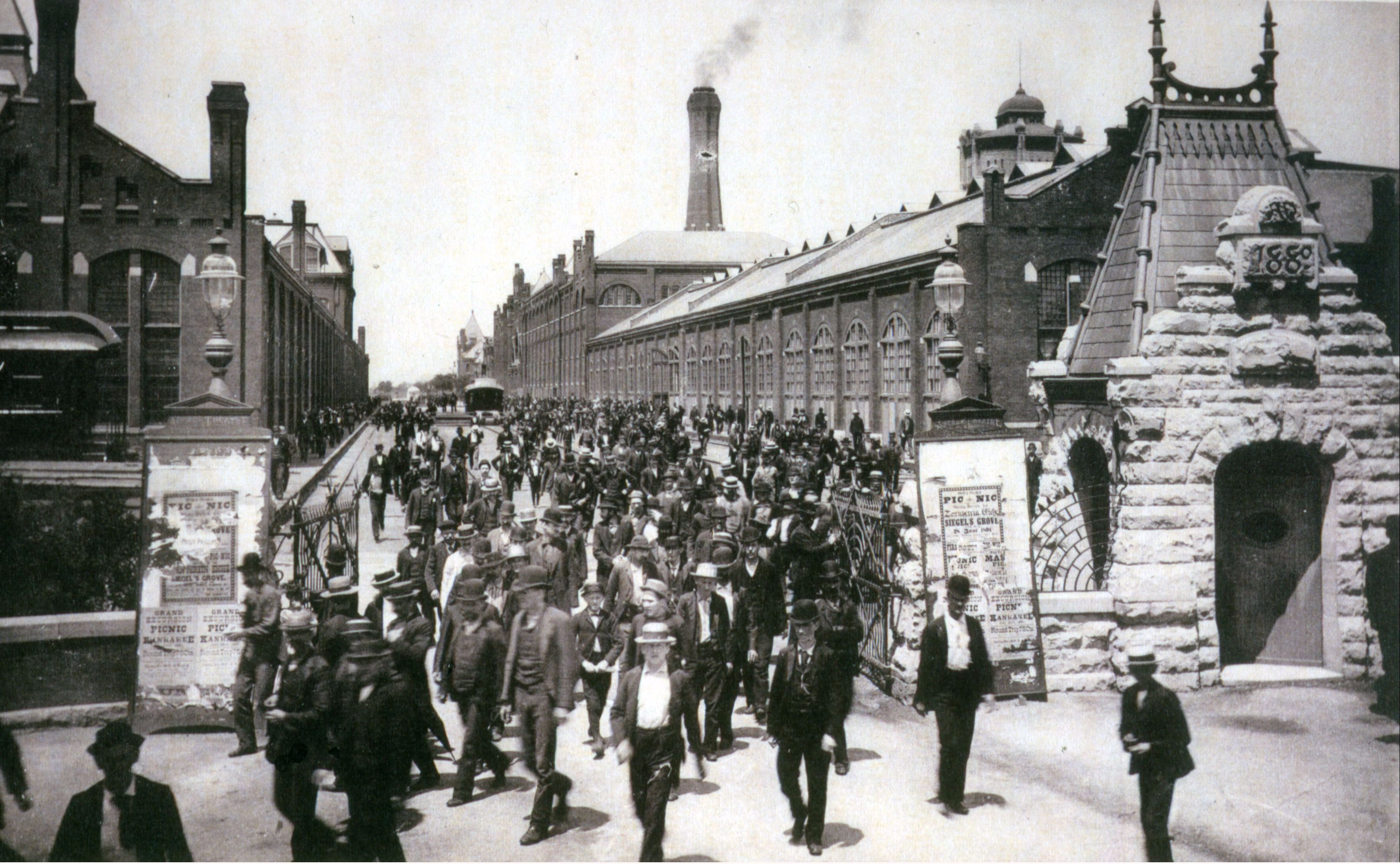
The Pullman Palace Car Works, 1893

Solon Spencer Beman was commissioned with the design of the company town buildings, including 1,300 housing units. Nathaniel Franklin Barrett was tasked with the layout and landscape design. Former Chicago superintendent of sewage Benzette Williams developed the utilities and drainage system. The project began in early 1880 and the first factory buildings were nearly completed by fall. Housing was mainly built as red brick rowhouses and featured indoor plumbing. The spacious accommodations were a significant improvement over the tenements that workers were used to. Architecture predominately evoked the Queen Anne style with Romanesque details.

The town was designed with the hope that other companies would want to relocate there. Only Pullman subsidiaries and suppliers ever shared the campus. Additional housing was built north of the factories after the Union Foundry and Allen Paper Car Company moved their operations there. Beman designed simpler, cheaper housing for these largely unskilled employees. Pullman employees, by contrast, were largely young and skilled. Rents were set to provide a 6% profit to the company over construction costs. By 1883, the population of the community reached 8,000. The community was diverse: by 1885, less than half of the employees were American-born, but African Americans were not allowed to live on the premises. Women were employed by the Pullman Company to sew.

The City of Chicago annexed Pullman in 1889, though the Land Association maintained control of town management. The town was not the success that George Pullman envisioned; profits from rent never reached the six percent intended. The artificial bounds of Pullman's community of factory workers contributed to the company town's failure. In 1890, a report made by the Pullman Company stated that 38% of over 5,000 workers lived in the area outside of Pullman. These 38% often lived in neighboring communities like Roseland, Kensington, and Gano, becoming third places for factory workers and Pullman residents. Local bars, businesses, and churches in these communities pulled the company's workers outside what the Pullman Company advertised as an isolated town provided for workers and their families. These areas were a big part of the workers' lives that the annual Pullman Labor Day parade from 1886-1894 began and ended in Pullman, but went through the surrounding communities on the parade route.

Pullman was a popular attraction during the 1893 World's Columbian Exposition, as visitors came to see the unusual town advertised in the Transportation Building. Prior to the World's Fair, proponents of the company town hailed it as a utopian community. Furthering this ideal, Pullman advertisements at the Columbian Exposition associated the company town with the same values espoused by the Exposition's White City. The Pullman Company's advertisement pamphlet proclaimed the town as a place "where all that is ugly and discordant and demoralizing is eliminated, and all that inspires to self respect, to thrift and to cleanliness of thought is generously provided.”

== Pullman Strike ==
The Panic of 1893 began which devastated the railroad industry. Demand for sleeping cars plummeted, so to maintain a profitable enterprise, Pullman lowered wages for employees. Rents, automatically deducted from paychecks, were not decreased.

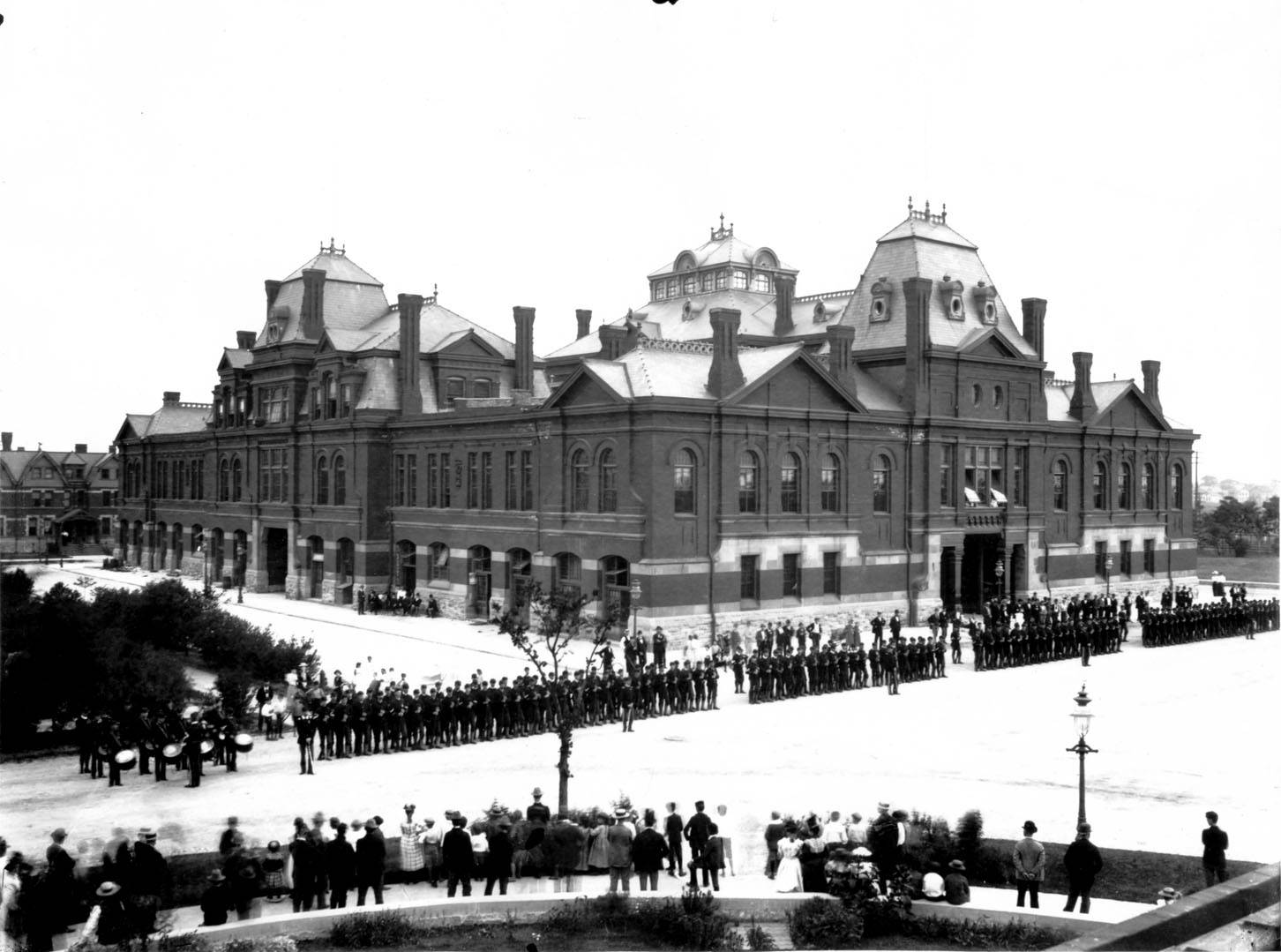
Striking workers outside the Arcade Building

Meanwhile, the American Railway Union (ARU), led by Eugene V. Debs, formed in Chicago on June 20, 1893. Membership grew to 150,000, including many of the white workers of Pullman. Pullman employees attempted to use the union to leverage support for wage increases, but their pleas were ignored. On May 11, 1894, employees went on strike. Pullman leadership, however, had put itself in a financial position to withstand a short-term work stoppage as the nation recovered from the financial panic.

To combat this, the ARU launched a boycott on Pullman, where ARU would refuse to run trains with the cars. The extensive use of Pullman cars across the country further crippled the railroad industry and stymied rail traffic. The twenty-four Chicago railroads represented by the General Managers' Association rallied together against the boycott. They used strikebreakers to replace striking workers and convinced lines to run Pullman cars with their mail cars. If strikers shut down lines with mail cars, the federal government would have to intervene as it threatened interstate commerce. Indeed, lines were closed and the government found the boycott in violation of the Sherman Antitrust Act.

Thousands of U.S. Marshals and Army troops were deployed to Chicago to break the boycott. Fights between the workers and the military left dozens dead or injured. After ARU leaders, including Debs, were jailed, the strike and boycott were quelled. Some workers that renounced the union were allowed to return to work. Although the public was generally opposed to the boycott, the strike also tarnished the Pullman brand. Pullman died in 1897 and had his grave sealed in a block of concrete and steel to prevent desecration of his body.

=== Aftermath ===
The Pullman Strike changed the American labor landscape. It was an example of the power a union could have against an industry, but it also affirmed the right of the government to intervene against strikes, particularly after the Supreme Court upheld the actions in in re Debs (1895). The Illinois Supreme Court forced the Pullman Company to sell its non-industrial holdings in 1898 and residents were given the first option on purchasing their houses. Most of the land was sold off by 1907.

Under second president Robert Todd Lincoln, Pullman cars were converted to all-steel construction. This required a $5 million investment in remodeling the shops. Despite a brief labor strike in 1904, the Pullman Company restored its place as a leading railcar provider. However, the town never recovered its identity as a company town as employees moved to newer neighborhoods nearby.

== Agreement with Brotherhood of Sleeping Car Porters ==
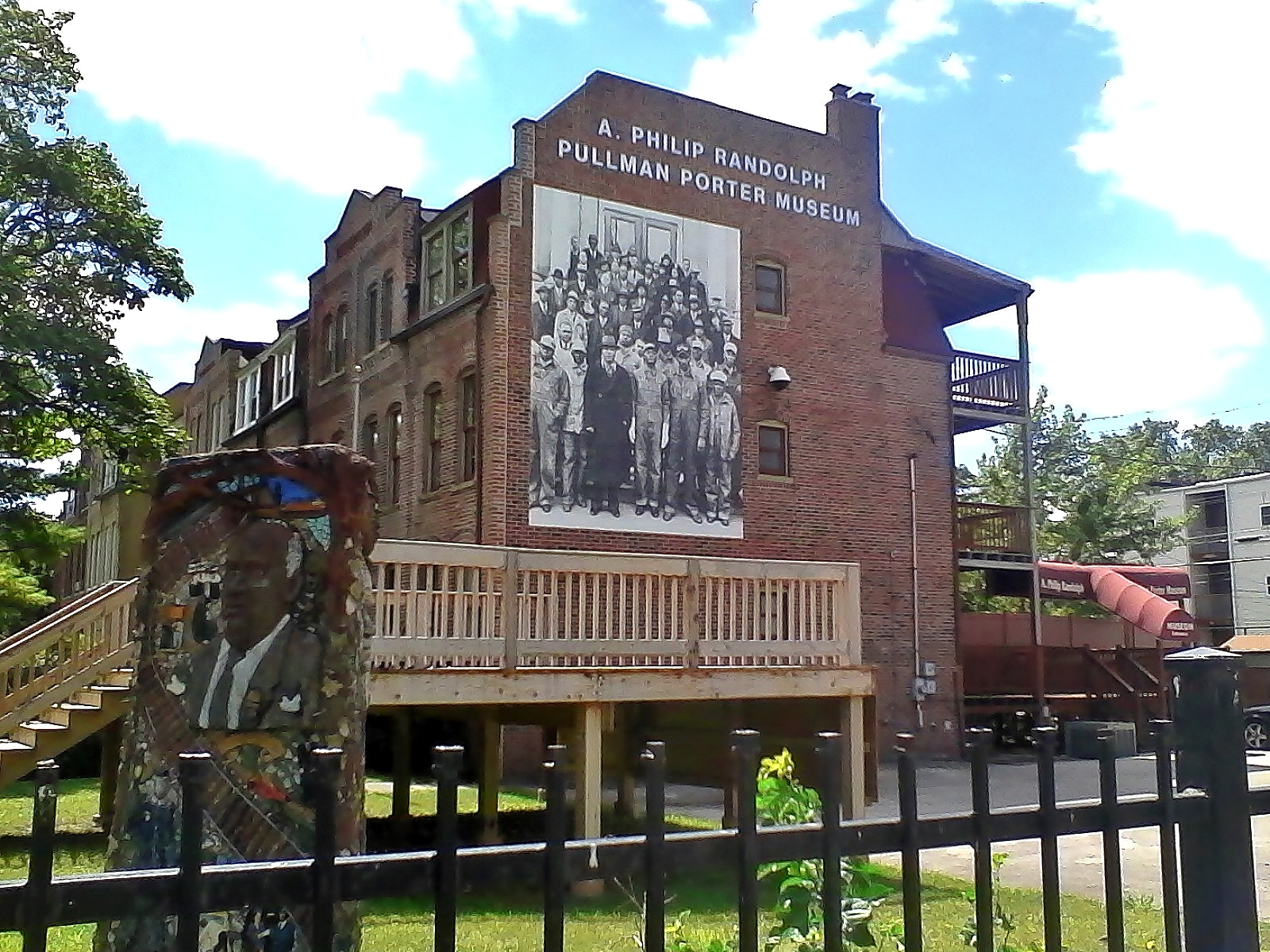
The A. Philip Randolph Pullman Porter Museum is in the Pullman District.

Unionization of African American workers began in 1925, when the Brotherhood of Sleeping Car Porters was founded by A. Philip Randolph in New York City. Forty-four percent of the Pullman workforce was porters, making Pullman the nation's largest employer of African Americans. A landmark agreement was reached between the two parties in 1937, becoming the first major labor agreement between a company and an African American union. The NAACP lauded the contract and recognized it as an important step in increasing and improving the "respect, recognition and influence, and economic advance" of African Americans.

== Competition and the end of rail ==
The decline of rail usage in favor of cars and aviation led to the decline of the Pullman Company. After a major downsizing in the 1940s, the Pullman Company was largely closed by 1957. It officially ceased operations in 1969. The south wing of the factory and the erecting shops were later used by several steel companies.

== Landmarks ==
=== Administration and factory complex ===
The manufacturing center of Pullman, the Administration and Factory Complex were unusually ornate industrial buildings. They were designed to sit in a park-like setting, overlooking the artificial Lake Vista, which was a cooling reservoir for the Corliss steam engine. The buildings, several hundred feet long, were well-lit and ventilated. The main facade, mirrored in the lake, faced the Illinois Central tracks, and thus was one of the first buildings a visitor would see. Beman designed the structures with a linear manufacturing process in mind, making the factory an early adapter of the assembly line.

=== Hotel Florence ===
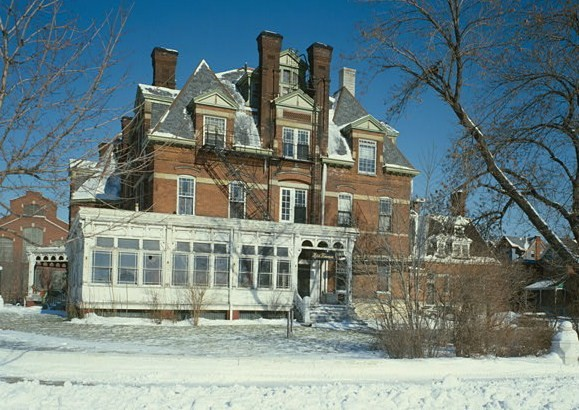
Hotel Florence in 1977

Hotel Florence, named for Pullman's daughter, was opened on November 1, 1881. Intended to showcase the town to visitors, the hotel featured fifty rooms and the only bar in the community. Built at a cost of $130,000, (equivalent to $4.34 million in 2025), it grew to 23,000 square feet (2,100 m^{2}) after an addition was constructed in 1914. A suite was kept for Pullman on the second floor for when he visited the factory. Each floor presented a different class of service, with the most opulent rooms on the second floor and more modest accommodations on the fourth. It recently completed an extensive rehabilitation, mainly of its first floor and basement. The annex has not been rehabilitated and is closed.

== Preservation and rehabilitation ==
A proposal in 1960 to demolish the community in favor of a new industrial park galvanized residents to form the Pullman Civic Organization (PCO) to support its preservation. On October 8, 1969, the remaining 300-acre (120 ha) neighborhood was recognized by the National Park Service (NPS) with a listing on the National Register of Historic Places. The next year, it was recognized as a National Historic Landmark District, a site deemed to have "exceptional value to the nation." The southern portion was locally recognized as a Chicago Landmark on October 16, 1972. A second Chicago Landmark, for the northern portion, was created in 1993, then merged into the other landmark in 1999. The PCO provided grants to help residents restore their houses, and a non-profit called the Historic Pullman Foundation purchased several key buildings for rehabilitation in the 1970s.

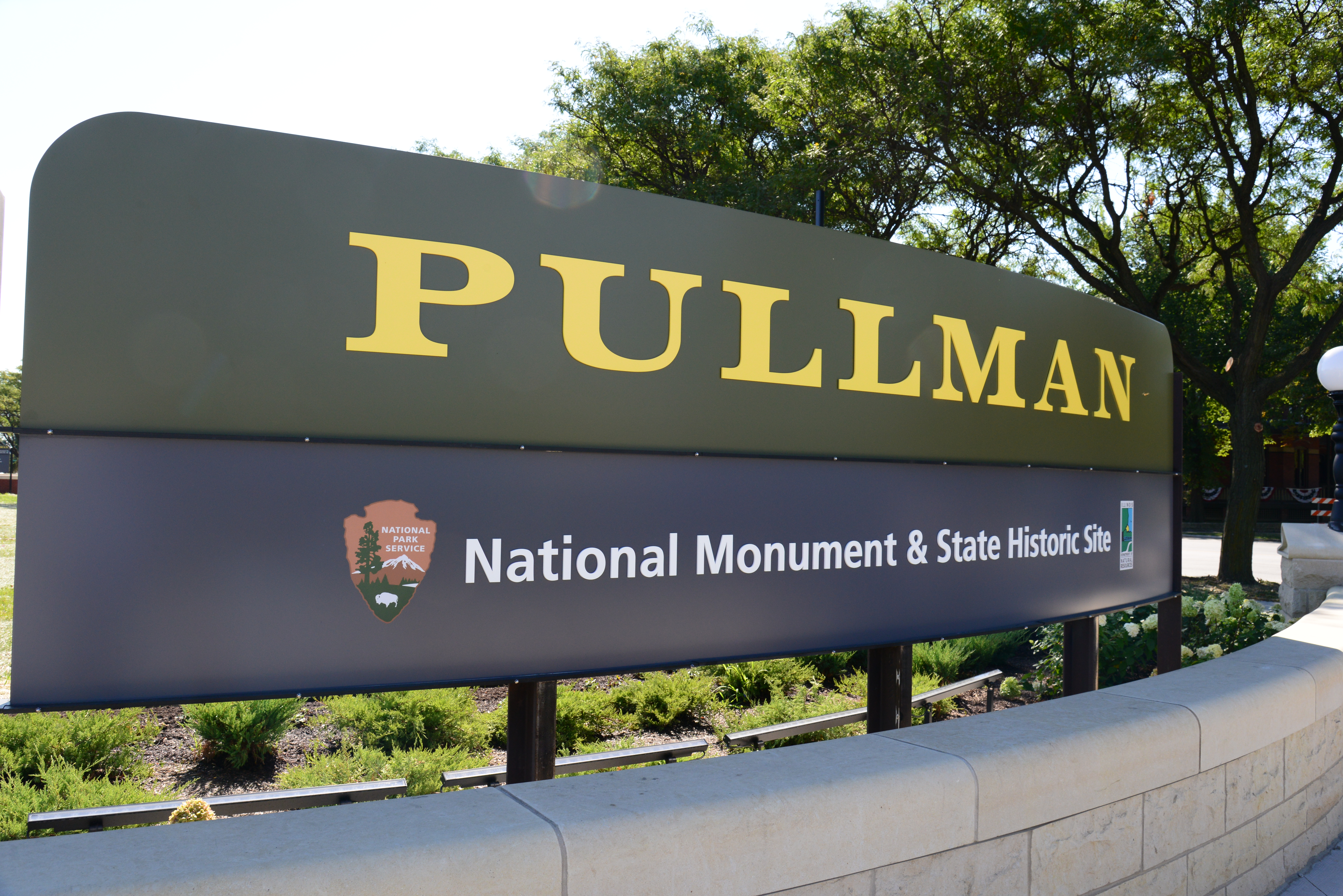
The Entrance to the Pullman National Monument and State Historic Site

The State of Illinois purchased Hotel Florence and the Administration and Factory Complex in 1991 and incorporated it into a state historic site through the Illinois Historic Preservation Agency. However, a 1998 arson destroyed much of the latter building before it could open to visitors. It is now in the process of reconstruction. President Barack Obama designated Pullman as a national monument, thus a component of the NPS, on February 19, 2015. It became the first unit of the NPS in Chicago. In 2015, the National Parks Conservation Association and the Chicago Chapter of the American Institute of Architects published a report on development for the park.

South gate of the Administration Building / Clock Tower complex in September, 2026

In 2017, the National Park Service approved a plan to restore the clock tower building and turn it into a visitor center. The plan also calls for reconstructing the main gateway between the factory and housing areas. Toxic soil had to be first removed from the site. The soil was contaminated by waste materials when the factory was in use. The new visitor center opened on Labor Day, September 6, 2021. In attendance were local and national officials, including Illinois Governor J. B. Pritzker, and Secretary of the Interior Deb Haaland. The site opened to the public after the restoration of the Administration Building.

The Consolidated Appropriations Act, 2023 redesignated the site as Pullman National Historical Park in December 2022.

== Interpretive programs ==
Former Pullman Administration Building and Clock Tower in September, 2026

Pullman National Historical Park partners with the non-profit 501(c)(3) American Passenger Rail Heritage Foundation to provide on-board educational programs for train passengers on the South Shore Line. On select Saturdays, Interpretive Guides with the APRHF Rail Rangers ride roundtrip between Millennium Station and South Bend International Airport station to provide narration about the park and the other sites passengers see outside their window.

== In popular culture ==
In the 2004 animated Christmas film The Polar Express, which references several pieces of railroad history, the look of the buildings at the North Pole Square were inspired by the Pullman Factory.
