= Pullman Memorial Universalist Church =

Church building in Albion, New York, US

Coordinates: 43.2450°N 78.1934°W

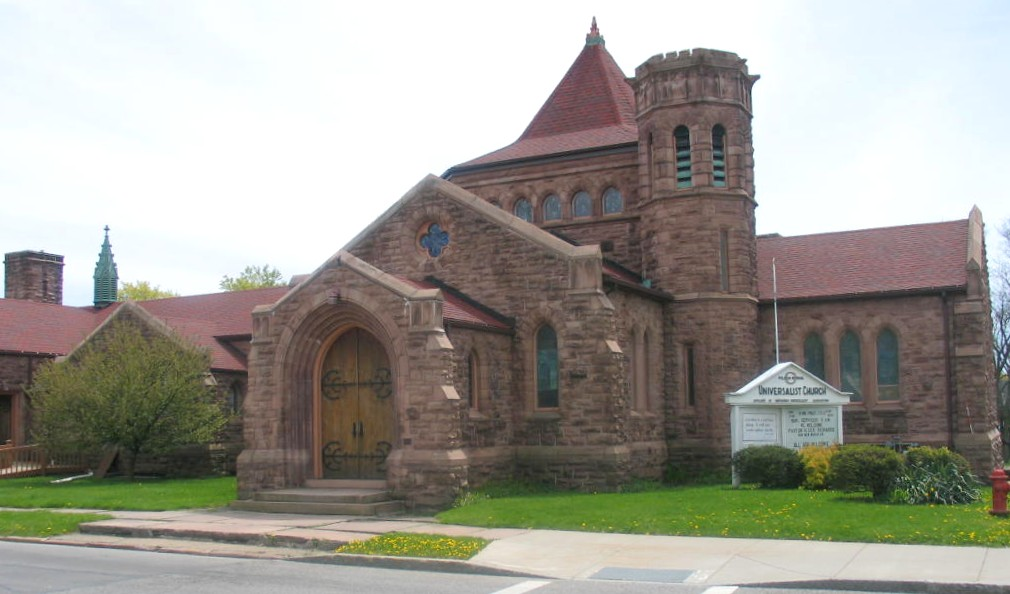
- Pullman Memorial Universalist Church
- Location: 10 East Park Street, Albion, New York
- Country: United States
- Denomination: Unitarian Universalist Association
- Website: www.pullmanuu.org

History
- Dedicated: 1895

Architecture
- Completed: 1894

The Pullman Memorial Universalist Church of Albion, New York was constructed in 1894 (dedicated 1895) as a memorial to the parents of inventor and industrialist George Mortimer Pullman. The structure, built of pink Medina sandstone and featuring fifty-six Tiffany stained glass windows and a Johnson pipe organ, is in the Orleans County Courthouse National Historic District. The building has been in constant use since its opening; the congregation affiliating with the Unitarian Universalist Association in 1961 but keeping its historic name.

== Style ==
The building was designed by Solon S. Beman in the style of Old English Gothic with Richardsonian Romanesque features. Its long, low horizontal profile outside and its arrangement and general layout inside anticipate modern architectural trends several decades later. Beman found rough hewn locally quarried Medina pink sandstone complementary to the simple forms and heavy proportions of the Richardsonian style. The result is a compact, centralized building with a tower reminiscent of that over the crossing of Richardson's Trinity Church (1872) in Boston. Beman's use of unpolished stone pierced by unmolded windows that reveal the thickness of the fabric, added to the overall composition of distinct units unified by strong horizontality and subordination to the crossing tower conform to Richardsonian tradition. The main entrance is made of a series of stone moldings, with oak plank doors and decorative wrought iron hinges. Like many Richardson churches, exterior massiveness and sobriety give way to spaciousness and color on the interior.

The interior dimensions and curved ceilings are those of a chapel, yet the church can seat 400 (700 with the wide East-side doors opened to the parlor). Inside the main entrance door are bronze bas relief medallions (plaques) designed by sculptor Carl Rohl-Smith – one of Emily Caroline Pullman, the other of James Lewis Pullman. Most of the woodwork and cabinetry are of quarter-sawn golden oak in a dark stain. The church sanctuary contains forty-one stained glass windows by Tiffany Glass and Decorating Company of New York. The three windows facing west in the west transept are made of high-quality hand-rolled glass. The large window depicts the resurrection of Jesus Christ and is signed by Tiffany. In the crossing directly above the pulpit is a ceiling stenciled with blue and gold designs on canvas from which hangs a 45-branch electrolier. The church houses a pipe organ with stenciled gold leaf pipes. To the east, off the sanctuary, are the church parlors, class rooms, kitchen and dining room.

== Background ==
Building a Universalist church in Albion was first proposed by Charles A. Danolds in July, 1890 at Castle Rest, the summer home of Mrs. James Lewis Pullman in the Thousand Islands. Danolds asked George Pullman if he would contribute $5,000.00 toward a church in Albion. Pullman replied he "...would be happy to contribute a little money necessary to build a Universalist church in Albion as a memorial to my father [Lewis Pullman]."

Lewis Pullman was a Universalist - he joined the church in his former home in Brocton, New York, and led the religious service when the missionary preacher was in another part of the circuit. He brought his fervor for Universalism to Albion. It is recounted that when the Pullmans moved to Albion one of the "leading citizens" gave Lewis friendly advice: "I am as strong a believer in Universalism as yourself, but if you want to succeed here, join one of the popular churches and say nothing about your doctrine." However, Lewis Pullman replied, "I can succeed nowhere except as an honest man; I have the courage of my convictions."

There were four Universalist churches in the county, but none were thriving. The nearest, to which Charles Danolds belonged, was at Fairhaven (the present-day Childs). The Albion preaching station was part of the Fairhaven charge. In the late 1840s the Fairhaven church was served part-time by whatever ministers were available - there were none at all from 1848 to 1852. In 1852 Rev. William B. Cook moved to Gaines - for four years he preached at Fairhaven and Clarendon until he, too, moved on. Thus Albion Universalists were in the same situation as those in Brocton - when they had a preacher they worshiped at the courthouse, otherwise Lewis Pullman led religious services in private homes. By default, Lewis Pullman served as the resident Universalist minister.

To assure George Pullman that a Universalist church in Albion would begin with enthusiasm, Charles Danolds went home from the Castle Rest meeting and placed an article in the Democratic newspaper outlining Pullman's interested in building a $30,000 Universalist church as a memorial to his father Lewis. Danolds spent the next eleven months rallying support for the project. On June 15, 1891, Pullman stopped at Albion to gauge local interest in the building. Danolds and the Universalists he had gathered displayed enough enthusiasm to satisfy their benefactor. The next step in Danolds' building campaign was a conference.

The Universalist conference to form a church in Albion met at the courthouse on Wednesday-Thursday, July 15–16, 1891. Ten Universalist ministers attended to show their support for the proposed church and to organize the new congregation. The Wednesday meeting was called to order by Charles Danolds. Frank E. Kittredge, an Albion entrepreneur who at that time ran a patent medicine business, was named secretary. Rev. Thomas Borden, of Sherman, gave the keynote address. Knowing the religious liberals of this vicinity from his long pastorate at Fairhaven, he was firm in the belief that a strong Universalist church could be maintained in Albion if those friendly to the cause would commit to the project at the conference.

The conference then adjourned to the Presbyterian chapel, where the ladies of Fairhaven served dinner. In the afternoon they returned to the courthouse, where the ministers each gave a ten-minute sermon. Rev. Alfred Ellsworth Wright, son of farmer Justus W. Wright of Rich's Corners, who was supplying the Fairhaven church, stated that some could only be Baptists, or Methodists, and others could only be Universalists. Rev. George W. Powell, of Lockport, gave the closing sermon, saying the difference between the Universalists and other denominations was a little word of four letters - LOVE.

On Thursday morning the business committee presented a temporary organization of the Pullman Church Memorial Society of Albion. The society adopted their report and elected the following trustees: Charles A. Danolds, Wm Hallock (also Treasurer), Sheldon Warner, William A. Tanner, Mrs. Seth S. Spencer, Mrs. Frank E. Kittridge, and Mrs. George J. Reed. One hundred people joined the new society and pledged $25 a week to fund weekly services at the courthouse. George Pullman was notified of the gratifying outcome of the conference, and the society got right to business - Rev. A.E. Wright preached the first sermon on July 26.

The church was formally organized under New York State law at a meeting at the courthouse on Tuesday, August 18, 1891. An organizational committee consisting of Seth S. Spencer, John A. Dibble and J. W. Wright was appointed to present a list of by-laws and report a list of Officers. The following were elected: Charles A. Danolds, John Lattin, Mrs. Joseph Hart, Sheldon Warner, Mrs. Seth S. Spencer, William A. Tanner, J. D. Billings, Adelbert Chapman, Mrs. Frank E. Kittredge, George J. Reed (Treasurer) and Frank E. Kittridge (Secretary). The official name of the church became the "Pullman Memorial Universalist Church of Albion"

== Raising funds ==
To ensure matching funds and in-kind donations to the church he was endowing, George Pullman informed the Albion Universalists that his gift depended on the society raising $5,000.00 as a Guarantee Fund. The fund would show that they were serious about their new church and would have the money to maintain the new building once it was built. On the motion of Charles Danolds, the moderator of the organizational meeting appointed ten church members - men and women, lawyers, well-to-do farmers, and entrepreneurs - as a soliciting committee to raise the required money.

The Guarantee Fund committee members gathered subscriptions from loyal Universalists and held several social events. However the society did not have a regular minister to provide leadership - Rev. George W. Powell, who had a church at Lockport, preached for the new society when he could until, in April 1892, he left the ministry to go into public speaking. Thus, nine months after it had begun, fundraising for the new church was bogged down and leaderless. It was during this period that Emily Caroline Pullman died, on May 21, 1892. The family came by private car to bury her in Mount Albion Cemetery next to James Lewis Pullman. Another of the Pullman family connections to Albion was gone.

The Guarantee Fund languished into the fall. Then, the New York Universalist Convention stepped in rather than lose the large endowment through lack of interest, and assigned missionary Rev. Daniel Wright to the Albion church. Rev. Wright first preached at Fairhaven on September 11, then at Fairhaven and Albion on September 18. He brought in the Universalist State Superintendent of Churches to preach at Fairhaven, Albion, and the Porter School House, in the Town of Albion. Not conventional Sunday services, they were inspirational meetings to raise money and save the Pullman gift. The size of the Guarantee Fund was announced at each meeting and everyone donated.

Rev. Wright also organized the ladies of the church, on October 11 establishing a ladies' aid society with fourteen members who pledged to raise $500 for the Guarantee Fund. Their first effort was a social event at the residence of Mrs. Joseph S. Hart. Then Rev. Wright organized a two-day conference at the GAR Hall on Thursday-Friday, November 17–18, and invited prominent Universalist clergymen to preach. On Friday night, after the preaching, the Ladies Aid put on a reception and sociable. By the end of that meeting the Guarantee Fund was $4,500.

Rev. Wright kept up the meetings, raising money every Sunday - on November 27, backed up by the Fairhaven “quartette,” he preached on “Holy Ground,” taking in $190. The Ladies Aid put on a pie social at the GAR Hall - entertainment and supper for 20 cents. The ladies went all out for the first annual Universalist Holiday Fair on Tuesday and Wednesday, December 20–21 - ice cream and cake the first night, hot supper the second - to raise another $200.

The fund-raising blitz was successful - the trustees met on December 25, 1892, to announce that the $5,000.00 had been pledged. Rev. Daniel Wright had accomplished his assignment; he left after giving his last sermon on January 8, 1893. On February 6 Rev. John A. Copeland, a native of Clarendon who had served in the Civil War, came to Albion to give a lecture, “The Battle of Bull Run,” for the benefit of the Universalist church - adults 25 cents and children 15 cents. The congregation enjoyed his talk and asked him to take the pastorate; he accepted.

== Land purchase and fund collection ==
On January 2, 1893, George Pullman wrote that he would be in Albion soon to look at sites. George was experienced in building and had an architect, Solon S. Beman, who had designed Pullman's summer cottage in New Jersey, added a conservatory to their mansion in Chicago, and designed and oversaw the construction of Pullman, Illinois, the new industrial and residential village the Pullman Palace Car Company south of Chicago.

During the winter of 1892-93 Beman drew up plans for the new Pullman church. Beman envisioned a minimal church containing the bare essentials for Christian worship - a cross of pink Medina sandstone in the English Gothic style with a dome over the crossing and a bell tower in one comer. The entrance was at the head of the cross - the congregation would enter at the front and proceed straight back. The pulpit was just beyond the crossing, facing the entrance, with the organ and the choir behind it. Behind the choir were the Sunday School room and the parlor, which could be opened up to provide seating for three hundred more worshipers. Now that there were actual plans to base cost estimates on, the estimated cost had risen to $40,000.

George Pullman, his elder daughter, Florence, and S.S. Beman brought the plans to Albion on April 13, 1893, when they looked over possible church sites with the church officers. Pullman's favorite sites were the Royce Homestead at the northwest corner of Main and West Avenue (the old Bell's Plaza) and the Proctor homestead on the southwest comer of Main and West Park (now St. Joseph's rectory). The church officers liked the Sheldon Warner home at the northwest corner of Main and West Park, next to the Episcopal Church.

Pullman stated that he was ready to proceed with the church as soon as the society actually possessed the promised $5,000. Therefore, the society asked everyone to make good on his subscription by May 1 so that construction could begin. The subscribers did not meet the May 1 deadline - the last of the Guarantee Fund was taken to the Orleans County National Bank on May 28.

When the money was in the bank George bought the lot - on June 26 paying $7,500 for a prime lot on the square that had not been previously mentioned - the home of Mrs. C.R. Burrows on the southeast corner of South Main and East Park. George held the deed - he would turn it over to the society when the church was completed. The plan was to take over the property on August 1, have the building enclosed before snow flew, and have it fully complete and ready for occupancy in June 1894.

As soon as the Universalists had possession of their lot they held a social, hoping that this reunion of the liberal Christians of the community would result in a "broader Christian fellowship and a kindlier feeling toward the new church." On Thursday evening, August 3, the grounds were illuminated with Chinese lanterns, the Crescent Musical Society provided music, and there was a literary entertainment. The crowd was larger than the house could comfortably handle, but the Ladies Aid added $40 to their funds.

== Construction ==
Final plans for the building were not drawn and approved until September 27. The new plans were adjusted to the sloping lot - the church front was changed from the head, which was on Main Street, to the side, on East Park Street. The new main entrance was on East Park, in the north cross-piece; a second entrance further east on East Park opened into the Sunday School room.

On the exterior the original cross design was obscured by the additions necessary for the social use of the building - the Sunday School classrooms, the trustees room, the dining room, and the pastor's study - but on the interior the original cross design was still very apparent. The pulpit was now in the south cross-piece, facing the new entrance. As before, the organ and choir were behind the pulpit. The estimated cost, with furnishings, had now risen to $60,000.

With the plans finalized in late September, the stone quarries informed the society that the stone could not be ready until spring. Then the society again lost its minister - Rev. Copeland accepted a call to the LeRoy Universalist church and preached his last sermon on October 8.

Albion was feeling the effects of the Panic of 1893 - one of the requests of the church society was that there be no outside contractor to take money out of the community and that Albion's day laborers would be used for the work. But the project was bogged down - winter would soon come and the contract for the stone and foundation work had not yet been let.

At the end of October Pullman summoned the church clerk, Frank Kittredge, and the architect, S. S. Beman, to New York City to discuss the project. As a result, on October 31 the stone and foundation work was let to DeGraff & Roberts. The DeGraff & Roberts quarry, in the bank of Sandy Creek just south of East State Street, had a reputation for producing beautiful pink Medina sandstone that carved well and held up in buildings. By the end of November DeGraff & Roberts had torn down the brick Burrows house. Excavation for the basement was stopped in December by winter weather. However, twelve stone cutters worked under sheds at the quarry through the winter, preparing the stone for the spring.

Pullman realized that the lack of a superintendent and a general contractor had caused slow progress so he hired J. H. Porter of Chicago as superintendent and Mr. Murphy of Tonawanda as general contractor. Contractor Murphy began work in March 1894 when DeGraff & Roberts delivered the stone.

=== Cornerstone ===
George Pullman wanted a cornerstone laying ceremony. The new church was to be a memorial to his father Lewis Pullman, who sixty-eight years earlier had renounced his Baptist faith. The church was also dedicated to the memory of Emily Caroline Pullman, who had left her Presbyterian faith to support her husband in Universalism. George Pullman had memorial booklets printed on the faith and life of each parent to place in the cornerstone to symbolically strengthen the building.

Lewis Pullman was a Mason and was buried in Albion with Masonic ceremonies in 1853. The cornerstone laying of the church, dedicated to the memory of a fellow Mason, required the participation of the Masons. Renovation Lodge invited the officials of the Grand Masonic Lodge of New York State to preside - the first time that such officials had presided at a cornerstone laying in Albion.

Saturday, May 19, 1894, was the second day of a five-day rainstorm that flooded the county. Many people were kept away from the cornerstone ceremony by the rain - most of the Niagara County Masons never came. Only four of the Grand Lodge officials arrived - Grand Master Frederick K. Burnham, Grand Treasurer John J. Gorman, Grand Marshal Elmer A. Miller, all of New York City, and Grand Senior Warden William A. Sutherland, of Syracuse. The other Grand positions were filled by Masons from Lockport, Medina, and Albion.

The planned grand procession through the streets was canceled - the two hundred Masons from Albion, Medina, Holley, and Lockport processed along Main Street, marching directly from their hall on East Bank to the church. The village businesses closed from 2:00 to 3:30 so the crowd stood in the rain to greet the Masons. A platform had been built at the level of the cornerstone, high up on the northeast corner of the church - now covered with a canvas awning to protect the Masonic officials during the ceremony.

Also in attendance were the Pullman party - George Pullman, his son George, his sisters Helen West and Emma Fluhrer, his brother Rev. Dr. Royal H. Pullman (Rev. Dr. James Pullman could not attend because of the death of a parishioner and Charles Pullman was never asked, or at least never came, to these ceremonies), his private secretary Charles S. Sweet, his traveling secretary, his architect S. S. Beman, and his friend and adviser Rev. Dr. Charles Eaton.

With the rain drumming on the awning, Acting Grand Chaplain Rev. F. S. Dunham of Christ Episcopal Church offered a prayer. Acting Grand Secretary George A. Newell read the list of articles included in the copper box. Grand Master Burnham then instructed Acting Grand Treasurer Newell: "You will now deposit these articles beneath the cornerstone, and may the Great Architect of the Universe, in His wisdom grant that ages upon ages shall pass away ere they shall again be seen by men."

The cornerstone was then dropped in place and mortared by Grand Master Burnham while he uttered the following prayer: "Almighty and eternal God, by whom all things were made, grant that whatsoever shall be builded on this stone may be to the honor and glory of Thy name, to which be praise forever."

The master architect presented the working tools to Grand Master Burnham, who delivered them to Grand Marshal Miller, who gave the square to Acting Deputy Grand Master John Hodge, the level to Grand Senior Warden Sutherland, and the plumb to Acting Junior Warden Charles Ross. After an invocation the square, the level, and plumb were applied, then Grand Master Burnham came forward and struck the stone three times with a gavel and declared it "well formed, true and trusty and laid in ample form." The stone was then consecrated with corn, oil, and wine.

By the end of the ceremony the rain had become so heavy that everyone adjourned to the courthouse, where the court room was packed to capacity. Rev. Dr. Royal H. Pullman delivered the address of the day, choosing as his theme Character Building. He alluded to his father and mother, in whose memory the church was erected and to the consecrated life lived by them in the old home in Albion. The Pullman Universalist Memorial Church was not erected by his brother George as a work of ostentation, but simply and purely as a memorial of the father and mother who believed in the doctrines of the Universalist church and who lived their religion among the people of this community many years ago.

The exercises were concluded by the benediction by Acting Grand Chaplain Rev. Dunham. A celebratory dinner for the visiting Masons was served in the dining room of Masonic Hall, followed by dancing. The Masonic officials were entertained next door at the Orleans House.

== Construction completes ==
In the summer of 1894 it seemed the church would be completed by the end of the year. The memorial window had been a problem - George Pullman had difficulty deciding on a theme. It was not until some time after the cornerstone laying that the theme of Christ with open arms was chosen. The 10-foot-tall window features a life-size image of Jesus over a quote from John 10:10 - "I am come that they might have life and that they might have it more abundantly" was designed by Frederick Wilson. It was hoped that Tiffany could get the window done and installed for a dedication at Christmas.

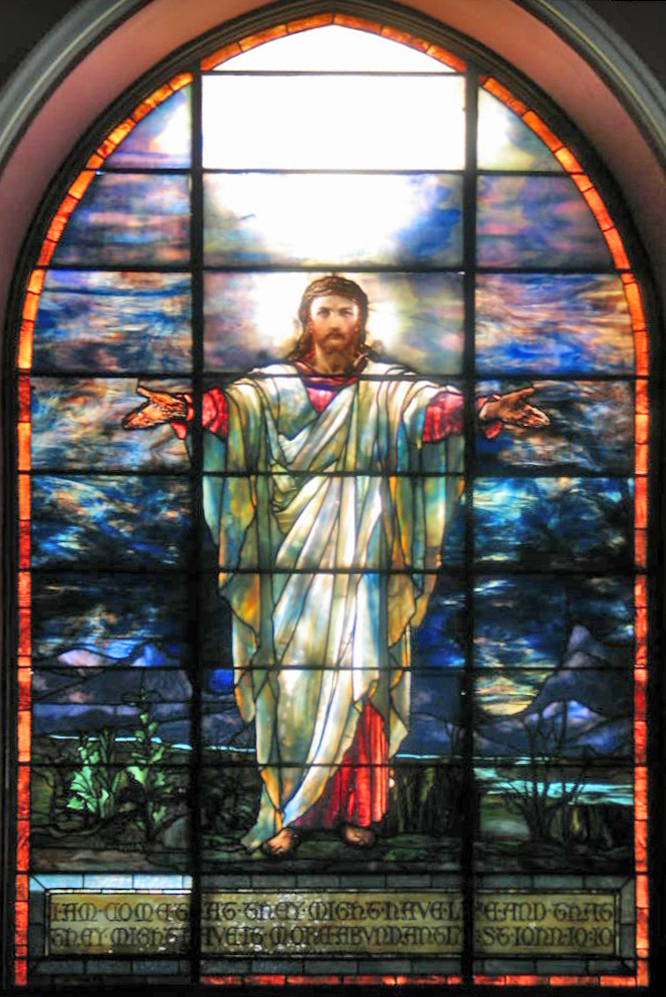
"Christ the Consoler" Memorial Window by Tiffany

The society then turned to the need for a minister since they had been without a permanent minister after Rev. John A. Copeland left in October, 1893. The congregation invited a wide variety of ministers to preach on summer Sundays so they would hear regular sermons and could look over possible permanent ministers. Reverend Thomas Borden began the summer by preaching at the courthouse on June 17. He was followed by Rev. Dr. James M. Pullman; Rev. Miss Henrietta Moore, of Ohio; Rev. Dr. Charles Fluhrer, of Grand Rapids, Michigan; Rev. J .H. Holder, of Amherst, Massachusetts; Rev. Alice K. Wright (wife of Rev. Alfred Ellsworth Wright) of Brooklyn; and, finally, on September 14, by Rev. Francis A. Gray of Nashua, New Hampshire.

The search concluded on October 14 when the society called Rev. Dr. Charles Fluhrer to the pastorate. Rev. Fluhrer had been a classmate of Rev. James Pullman at St. Lawrence University and Canton Theological School and was well known in the denomination and considered to be a fine scholar and able preacher as well as a sympathetic minister. He was also the brother-in-law of George's younger sister, Emma Pullman Fluhrer. Rev. Fluhrer would begin his pastorate when the church was dedicated.

In August the lathing and plastering was being pushed ahead, using the newly invented steel lath wire net that held plaster thoroughly, producing a firm and durable surface. By the middle of October, when George Pullman and other members of the family stopped by on their way east to look over the new church, the masons, carpenters and painters were almost finished. Pullman set early January as the tentative date for the dedication. A general dedication date had to be set relatively early because it would take time to mold and cast the bronze dedication tablet which George ordered to be dated "January 1895."

When the interior carpentry and plastering finished the church was ready for the pipe organ. The organ, from the Johnson Pipe Organ Company, Westfield, Mass., arrived in early November; company workmen spent the rest of the month installing it. As soon as the organ was installed workmen from Tiffany's workshop in New York City arrived to paint the walls and ceilings with the special "Tiffany blend," which modulated from terracotta on the walls to gold on the ceiling, and installed the fifty-six colored glass windows.

By the end of December the church was almost complete, so the dedication was set for Wednesday, January 16, 1895. The decorators were done by January 10, but the memorial window had not yet arrived. Pullman visited Albion on the 10th, refused to dedicate the church until it was complete, and postponed the dedication until further notice.

The half-ton memorial window arrived Tuesday, January 15. The new dedication was set for Thursday, January 31. Pullman ordered the souvenir programs, which contained the text of all the speeches and the order of the ceremonies, and the exact date. The workmen rushed the memorial window into place.

== Dedication and opening ==
The doors of the Pullman Memorial Universalist Church first opened to the public on the morning of Thursday, January 31, 1895, with 1500 people attending the ceremonies. The crowd filled the church within five minutes of opening the doors in order to escape the cold.

The Pullman family, who had arrived in three private railway cars, and their friends occupied the west wing of the transept, nearest the memorial window and the memorial tablet. The seating plan left out a pew so that the tablet on the north wall could be easily read: "Erected by a Son as a Memorial to his Father JAMES LEWIS PULLMAN in recognition of his love and work for the Universalist Church and its Faith and in Memory of his Mother EMILY CAROLINE PULLMAN one with her husband in the joys and hopes of religion. Dedicated January 1895."

The dedication ceremony began at 10:30. The choir (a quartet) from the Third Presbyterian Church of Rochester provided music. George Pullman delivered the deed, ending his short speech by saying, "I hope and firmly believe that the spirit of the prayers offered to the throne of Grace from the old red school-house, whose influence, through a period of more than fifly years, has resulted in the building of this church, will continue, and will echo and re-echo within its walls to the lasting benefit of many people.”

The society clerk, Frank Kittredge, accepted the deed and the keys. Rev. Dr. R. H. Pullman preached the dedication sermon, from the text, "What mean these stones" which embraced a history of the Pullman family with a panegyric of the father and mother, in whose memory the church was erected.

In the afternoon the church doors were again opened, for the installation of Rev. Dr. Fluhrer as pastor of the new church. This time Rev. Dr. James Pullman presented the sermon, speaking the sentences of installation for his friend.

In the evening the doors were opened for the third time, for the reception for Mr. Pullman and Rev. Fluhrer and the visiting clergymen. Receiving the guests were Mr. and Mrs. Pullman, Rev. and Mrs. Fluhrer, and Mr. and Mrs. Danolds. An elaborate repast was served by the ladies of the church. In a single day the society received the keys to their new church, installed their new pastor, and held their first church supper.

Final construction costs were reported at $64,000.00. Total costs with lot, furnishings, dishes, communion set, linens, carpets, etc. were estimated at between $100,000.00 and $150,000.00. George Pullman's investment in Universalism established the only Universalist church in an Orleans County village, and the only one of the five Orleans County Universalist churches still functioning today.

== Pipe organ ==
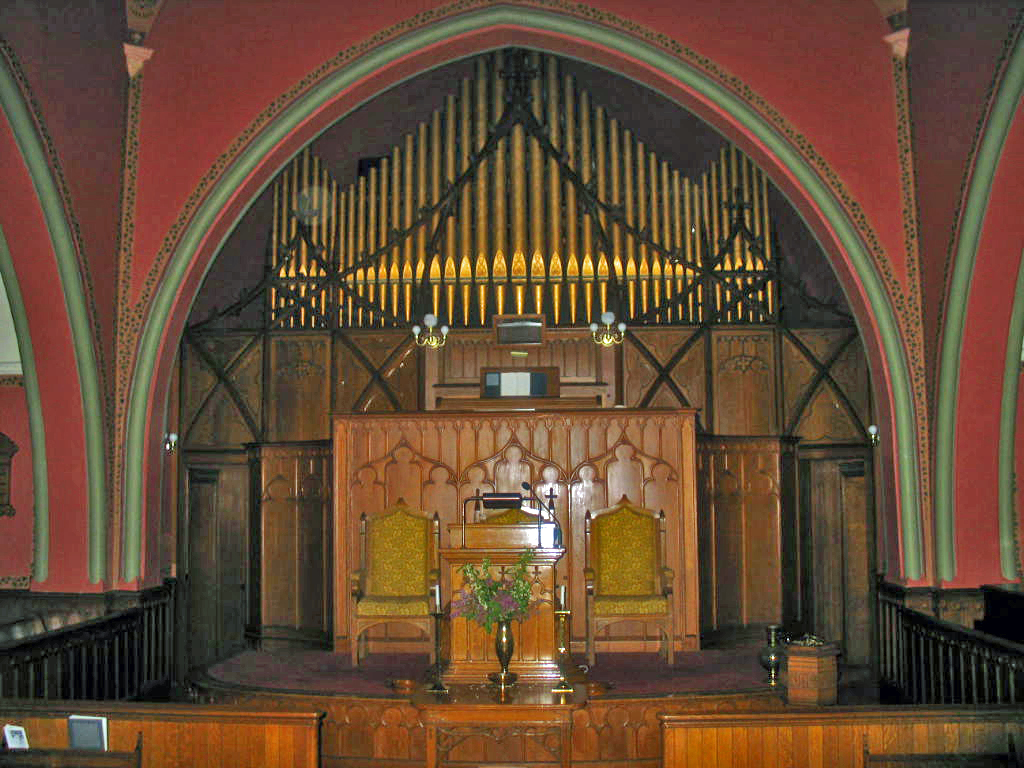
Johnson Pipe Organ behind the Pulpit

The organ, Opus 812 - considered to be "top of the line", was purchased from the Johnson & Son Organ Company, Westfield, Mass. It arrived in early November; company workmen spent the rest of the month installing it. The organ was reputed to cost $6,000.00. The Tiffany Glass and Decorating Company decorated the pipes after the installation was complete, by applying gold leaf stencil.

The organ contains 22 ranks with 1248 speaking pipes. A Rose water motor was used to supply power to operate the organ. The Rose water motor operated off the municipal water pressure which, in turn, caused a ratchet to move up and down, connected to the bellows. This allowed the church to fore-go hiring a bellows boy to pump the organ.

In 1948 a set of chimes was added in memory of Thomas Sweet, given by Mae Sweet. In 1959 the organ was electrified and the console moved from the organ loft to the west transept of the church. The rebuilding was done by Carl K. Rademaker of Middleport, NY. In 1994 the console was moved back to its original position in preparation for the church's centennial. The work was performed by Heritage Pipe Organs of North Tonawanda, NY with the assistance of church volunteers. The restored organ case lights were given by the children of the Sunday School. The organ retains its original facade pipes, most of which are actual speaking pipes.

== Chronology ==
- 1890 – Charles A. Danolds visited George Pullman in the Thousand Islands where they conceived the idea for a Universalist Church in Albion. If the local Universalists can raise $5,000.00, Mr. Pullman will match it with a church in memory of his parents James Lewis and Emily Caroline.
- 1891 – A meeting was held on August 18 for the purpose of legally organizing and incorporating the PMUC according to the laws of the State of New York. A committee was appointed to raise the $5,000 guarantee fund.
- 1892 – On December 25 the board of trustees announced that $5,000.00 had been pledged in amounts varying from $5 to $600.
- 1893 – George Pullman arrived in Albion to negotiate for the site at the comer of Main and East Park Streets. He pays $7,500.00 for the lot.
- 1894 – On May 19 at 2:30 p.m. Renovation Lodge F and AM with Grand Master Burnham and Masonic dignitaries from around New York state laid the cornerstone with traditional Masonic ritual.
- 1895 – The PMUC is dedicated on Thursday, January 31 with Rev. Dr. Royal H. Pullman, a brother of George M. Pullman and a Universalist Minister giving the dedication sermon. Rev. Dr. Charles Fluhrer is also installed as the first minister.
- 1906 – The Parsonage just south of the church was ready for occupancy. Designed by S.S. Beman, the same architect who designed the church, it cost approximately $20,000.
- 1910 – A silver communion service of individual cups was first used at the Good Friday Service. It was presented by Mrs. James G. Brown in memory of her mother Mrs. Eunice C. Rice.
- 1921 – Recorded that the church was valued at $75,000, the parsonage $11,000, and the church had 150 families, 350 individuals and 145 members.
- 1927 – The church was rewired - original knob-and-tube wiring replaced.
- 1928 – A steam table was installed to handle the annual turkey dinners.
- 1931 – Over 500 turkey dinners were served at$1.75 each.
- 1937 – The red fluted Spanish Tile roof was removed and replaced with patent roofing.
- 1938 – Sanctuary redecorated for the first time.
- 1939 – New carpet laid in church parlors - $500.00
- 1940 – Ladies Aid bought a brass cross in memory of Mrs. Jerome Brace.
- 1944 – The church celebrated the 50th anniversary of the laying of the cornerstone on May 19 with members of Renovation Lodge F and AM.
- 1948 – Two brass vases given by Mrs. Pridmore in memory of Addie Bradley. Chimes to organ given in memory of Thomas Sweet by Wife Mae.
- 1950 – Two new oil burners installed in church by Ralph Mosher. Exterior repointed and sanctuary redecorated for a second time.
- 1954 – Last annual meeting held on the dedication of church changed to November 1 (59 years).
- 1956 – Two brass candle sticks were given by Grant and Mae Barber.
- 1959 – Organ rebuilt, electrified, and console moved from choir loft to the west transept at a cost of $10,000.
- 1961 – The congregation affiliated within the merger of the American Universalist Church and the American Unitarian Association in what became the Unitarian Universalist Association.
- 1965 – A Festival of Art was held in June which drew community interest. The church presented an original dramatic play entitled the "Masque of Indifference" at a summer Union Service.
- 1966 – Rev. Warren Lovejoy presented "The Bomb That Killed God, Or Did It" as part of a summer Union Service. The Sanctuary was decorated in "warm ivory".
- 1971 – Rev. Richard Hood began his pastorate.
- 1972 – Bernard Lynch, church organist for 29 years, retired.
- 1976 – The church hosted a community event at Albion High School.
- 1984 – The church sanctuary was redecorated with volunteers and painted "Cedar Rust" to emulate earlier color schemes. The N.Y.S. Convention of Universalists held their 156th annual meeting in Albion.
- 1985 – Through subscriptions, the congregation raised money to purchase new carpet for the sanctuary. The sanctuary was rededicated because of its refurbishing.
- 1987 – Corrugated fiber glass roofing was placed over the dining room between the social room and east transept to correct deterioration of the light well.
- 1992 – North windows in the dining room were restored original sash after being boarded up since 1957.
- 1993 – East wall and front vestibule were repointed.
- 1994 – The organ console was returned to the choir loft. Side lights were restored to the walls of the sanctuary.
- 2008 – Certified as an official Welcoming Congregation by the Unitarian Universalist Association.
- 2011 – Congregation calls its first settled minister since 1971.

== Ministers ==
- Rev. Charles L. Fluhrer, D.D. 1895-1900
- Rev. Arthur W. Grose, D.D. 1901-1905
- Rev. Charles H. Vail, D.D. 1906-1915
- Rev. Edwin P. Wood 1915-1921
- Rev. Lewis H. Robinson 1921-1941
- Rev. Edgar R. Walker 1941-1942
- Rev. J. Murray Gay 1943-1946
- Rev. Donald W. Lawson 1946-1951
- Rev. Joseph Duell 1951-1952
- Rev. Joseph Sullivan Ph.D. 1953-1961
- Rev. Warren B. Lovejoy 1962-1966
- Rev. Kelsey Bicknell 1967-1970
- Rev. Kenneth Mochel 1971
- Rev. Richard Hood, 1971-2006 (Pulpit Supply)
- Rev. Donald Reidell 1977–present (Pulpit Supply)
- Rev. Betty Sintzenich (McCollum) 1989-1995 (Pulpit Supply)
- Susan Dodge-Peters Daiss, M.Div. 1996–present (Pulpit Supply)
- Rev. John Rex 1999–2012 (Pulpit Supply)
- Rev. Kelly Asprooth-Jackson 2009-2010 (Consulting)
- H. Lee Richards, M.Div. 2011–2016

=== Extended ministry ===
The only called (settled) minister to serve the congregation for longer than seven years was the Reverend Lewis Robinson. On Sept. 1, 1921 Rev. Robinson began his pastorate in the Pullman Memorial Universalist Church of Albion. He resigned March 1, 1941 on account of ill health. "He was considered an outstanding figure in the community, a worker in every cause for righteousness, and with all, one of the most popular preachers Albion has ever had. The people of the church exceedingly regret that health failed to the point where he is forced to resign and his resignation was accepted with deep regret."

Rev. Robinson was a member and Past Master of Renovation Lodge No. 97, Orleans Chapter R.A. M. and the IOOF Lodge. He was also a member of the Lions Club, served as chairman of the Albion Red Cross and was secretary of the Orleans County Fair Association.

Rev. Robinson actually served three Universalist Societies in Orleans County. Before coming to Albion and occasionally preaching at Childs, New York, he had served the Universalist Church at Clarendon. He is most noted for describing the appeal of Universalism with the quote "Soft seats and no hell."

=== Minister emeritus ===
On October 9, 2011, the church held a ceremony to confer the status of minister emeritus upon the Reverend Richard Hood who served the congregation for thirty-five years. Officially serving as pulpit supply rather than as a called minister, Rev. Hood performed other ministerial duties as needed. He initiated Talk-back Sundays, Pullman Pennies (a strategy to make tough decisions), a long-range plan, the church covenant (which appears in each hymnal), and the closing circle done on some Sundays. He also presided over the Good Friday service for all his years at Pullman. The ceremony to appoint Rev. Hood to Minister Emeritus marks the first time a minister in the church's 120-year history was so honored.

== Women's organizations ==
The Universalist Register of the United States and Canada in 1882 lists women's Centenary Associations organized in 1869 to assist in raising money for the Murray Fund. This was a fund to aid in the education of theological students. By 1882 it had already raised over $100,000.

The Register also listed Fair Haven Church (Thomas Borden, minister), now the Cobblestone Museum. Other churches in the area were Clarendon, Kendall, Olcott, Middleport, Lockport, Rochester, Buffalo, and Ridgeway.

The Women's Centenary Association later became the Ladies Aid Society with the purposes of raising money for their churches and missionary work. On October 11, 1892 in Albion the Ladies Aid and Missionary Society was organized with 14 charter members. These women pledged $500 towards the Guarantee Fund of $5,000 raised to keep the Pullman Memorial Universalist Church in repair. The ladies sometimes met for dinner and when they did the gentlemen were always invited to join them so meetings were not all business but more social events. By 1901 this membership had grown to 53 members.

Following is a summary of the October 6, 1901 meeting. "It was decided to have a reception for the Pastor and his wife the Rev. Arthur W. Grose, D.P. Cake and milk to be provided by the ladies, the Board of Trustees to furnish the ice cream. The flower committee for the month was Mrs. Burrows and Mrs. Flintham who offered to have charge if the ladies would contribute flowers for the church. Next, the Fair was discussed. It was decided to meet to make aprons as 25 already made had been sold. The next question was would the ladies serve their Annual Turkey Supper in connection with the Fair. The menu would be raw oysters, wafers, celery and pickles, roast turkey, cranberries, mashed potatoes, chicken salad, rolls, coffee, ice cream, and cake."

From the December 2, 1902 meeting, the recipe used for making mince meat was: 41 lbs. shoulder of beef, 10 lbs. suet, 1 barrel of apples (Spitzenburg), 20 lbs. seeded raisins, 10 lbs. currants, 5 lbs. citron, 10 lbs. sugar, 1 3/4 lbs. allspice, 1/4 lb. nutmeg, 2 oz. cloves, qt. salt, 2 gal. molasses, 1 qt. grape wine, juice from meat, sweet and sour cider, and fruit juices, all you can collect. This made 24 gallons of mincemeat, sold at 40 cents a quart. This mince meat was featured at the annual Fair and Turkey supper. This tradition was carried out until the early 1930s.

In January 1902 the group published a cookbook. The committee raised $250 in ads from local merchants to pay for printing one thousand books. The first one hundred dollars raised from the sale of books went to the fund for building a parsonage (built and dedicated in 1906).

The Ladies Aid paid the monthly salaries of the Sexton $15.00, organist $18.20, and musical director $20.83. This responsibility was undertaken for “the advancement of our beloved church.” The Ladies Aid sponsored many concerts, teas, Strawberry Socials, rummage sales, baked goods and apron sales. Individual members earned money for the Society by selling bread, aprons, cottage cheese, cookies, popcorn, shirtwaists, dusting, jellies, and pancakes. One Lenten season they raised $100 this way. They also provided flowers for the church services and funerals, and dinners for Church and Sunday School groups, a Fair & Turkey dinner, and mince meat in the month of November.

In the Annual Report of January 31, 1905, it was noted that the Juniors of the church and the Merry Maids had contributed money and the Get-Together club had given their aid in assisting at the Fair and entertainments. It was noted to discontinue paying the salary of the Sexton. “Both financially and socially this year has proven one of the most successful years and never has there been so large a gathering at the homes of the members showing their loyalty to the church and Society.”

Officers of the Society in 1901 were President Mrs. Charles Burrows, Secretary, Minnie Roberts, and Treasurer, Miss Mary Billings.

A printed invitation was sent out for a birthday party on March 26. 1908, it was in the form of a poem: This Birthday party is given for you; ’Tis nothing novel, nor is it new We forward you a little sack Please either send it or bring it back. With as many cents as you are years old; We promise the number shall never be told Refreshments there will be to eat and friends will furnish a literary treat The Ladies Aid with greetings hearty will welcome you to your Birthday Party.

The Get-Together Club was first mentioned in 1905, made up of younger ladies of the church, and sponsored by the Ladies Aid Society. The group was very active during the ministry of Rev. Lewis H. Robinson, who served the church from 1921 to 1941. At that time the Get-Togethers took over most of the activities of the Ladies Aid Society. The Get-Togethers provided most of the social life of the church, sponsoring dinners, entertainments, family picnics at the lake (Hamlin beach, Lakeside park, Point Breeze), dances, card parties, and worked on all the activities of the church.

In 1932 officers were President, Mrs. Fred Tanner, Vice-President, Mrs. Bert Crego, Secretary and Treasurer, Mrs. Palmer Lyon. These ladies entertained in their homes and husbands and children were always included. The Pullman Girls Club was mentioned in the December 27, 1908 church calendar. Officers were President, Inez Warner, Vice-President Genieve Marshall, Secretary Elsie Brown, Treasurer Velma Harding. This group consisted of young girls of High School age and slightly older who remained in the club for years and were still called the Pullman Girls. They cleaned the kitchen, painted, served suppers to the Men's Club, donated to the Pension Fund, and helped serve the Annual Turkey dinner, published a cook book in 1952, pledged money to support the church yearly, and furnished for many years the calendars for weekly Sunday Church Services.

On May 26, 1970 the Pullman Girls merged with the Get-Togethers Club to form the Pull-Togethers with twelve members. Officers elected were President, Jean Bistoff, Secretary-Treasurer, Betsy Hoffman, and Charlene Kyle as program chairman. Plans were made to have a bake sale and then a bazaar in October.

First public dinner put on by this group was a Chili Con Carne dinner that raised $125.00. Rance Wright grew and furnished the kidney beans already cooked. Group was asked to take charge of the coffee hour. The group raised money by putting on luncheons, suppers, rummage and bake sales. Money raised has been used for paint for the parlors, carpet for the Memorial Room, toward painting the Sanctuary, curtains for the dining rooms, paid one years insurance, purchased the grand piano, prepared the table for the Good Friday Service, and bought carpet for the Social rooms and many other items for the church.

When the Pullman Girls and the Get-Together Clubs merged, the Get-Togethers kept their money that was referred to as the “carpet fund”. Whenever the church was in financial need, help would come from the “carpet fund".

Other women's groups that are listed in the past orders-of-services are The Clover Circle, The Jolly Girls Club, the Lydian Circle, and the Clara Barton Guild.

== Notes ==
=== Sources ===
- "Dedication of the Pullman Memorial Universalist Church", Harvard Divinity School. Retrieved July 21, 2011.
- Signor, Isaac S. "Landmarks of Orleans County, New York", D. Mason & Company. 1894. p. 290-291. Retrieved July 25, 2011.
- Pullman Memorial Centennial Newspaper. 1994. Publication's contents researched by Neil Johnson (Albion Village Historian) and C.W. Lattin (Orleans County Historian). Retrieved July 21, 2011.
- "Pullman Memorial Church A Gift to the Universalist Denomination" New York Times, Feb. 1, 1895 archived article. Retrieved July 21, 2011.
- Pullman Memorial Universalist Church website.
- Vail, Charles H. "Historical Souvenir and Directory of the Pullman Universalist Church" 1910. Retrieved July 25, 2011.
