= George Pullman =

American engineer and businessman (1831–1897)

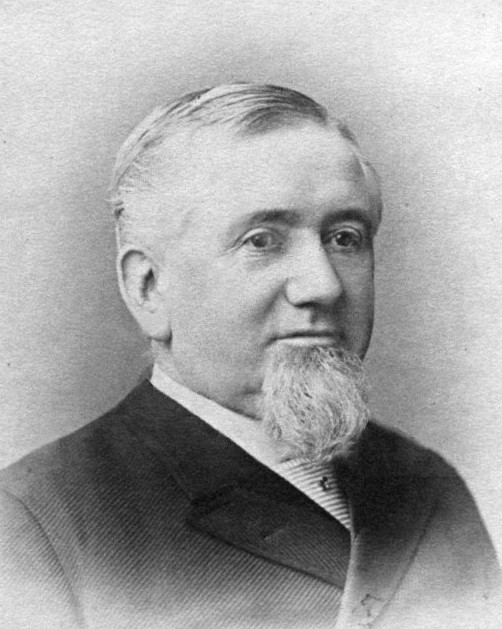
- Born: George Mortimer Pullman; March 3, 1831; Brocton, New York, U.S.
- Died: October 19, 1897 (aged 66); Chicago, Illinois, U.S.
- Occupations: Engineer; industrialist
- Spouse: Hattie Amelia Sanger (m. June 13, 1867) (1842–1921)
- Children: 4

Signature
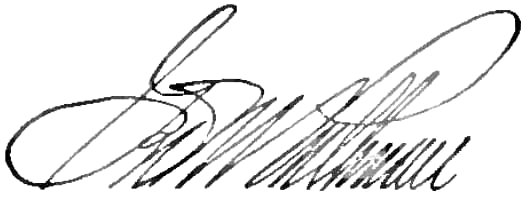

George Mortimer Pullman (March 3, 1831 – October 19, 1897) was an American engineer and industrialist. He designed and manufactured the Pullman sleeping car and founded a company town in Chicago for the workers who manufactured it. This ultimately led to the Pullman Strike due to the high rent prices charged for company housing and low wages paid by the Pullman Company. His Pullman Company also hired black men to staff the Pullman cars, known as Pullman porters, who provided elite service and were compensated only in tips.

Struggling to maintain profitability during an 1894 downturn in manufacturing demand, he halved wages and required workers to spend long hours at the plant, but did not lower prices of rents and goods in his company town. He gained presidential support by Grover Cleveland for the use of federal military troops which left 30 strikers dead in the violent suppression of workers there to end the Pullman Strike of 1894. A national commission was appointed to investigate the strike, which included assessment of operations of the company town. In 1898, the Supreme Court of Illinois ordered the Pullman Company to divest itself of the town, which became a neighborhood of the city of Chicago.

== Early life ==
Pullman was born in 1831 in Brocton, New York, the son of Emily Caroline (Minton) and carpenter James Lewis Pullman (known as Lewis). His family moved to Albion, New York, along the Erie Canal in 1845, so his father could help widen the canal. His father had invented a machine using jackscrews that could move buildings or other structures out of the way and onto new foundations and had patented it in 1841. By that time, packet boats carried people on day excursions along the canal, plus travellers and freight craft would be towed across the state along the busy canal.

Pullman attended local schools and helped his father, learning other skills that contributed to his later success. In 1853, Lewis died, and George took over his business at the age of 22.

== Career ==
Pullman was a clerk for a country merchant. Pullman took over the family business. In 1856, Pullman won a contract with the State of New York to move 20 buildings out of the way of the widening canal.

=== Chicago ===
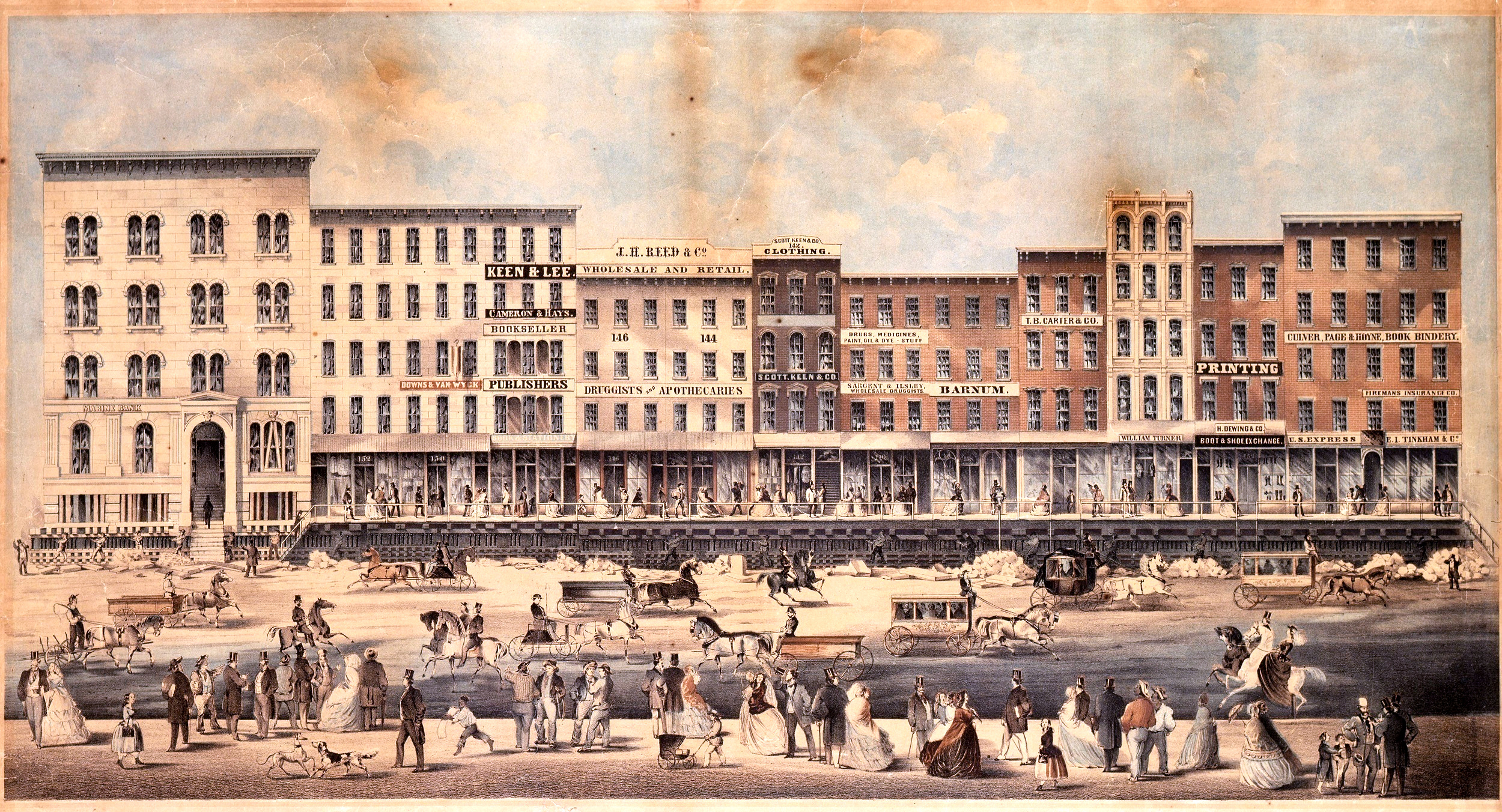
Mendel lithograph of a block of buildings raised by a consortium including Pullman

During the 1850s, the streets in Chicago often resembled a swamp, as the city had been built to too low an elevation on the shore of Lake Michigan. The city undertook to re-engineer its sewage system to clear the surface of the unwanted and often pathogenic standing water. This project necessitated the raising of the street level an average of over a metre.

As the streets rose above the front doors of the adjacent buildings, the buildings needed to be demolished and rebuilt or else physically raised so as to adjust to the newly raised level of the street. In 1859 Pullman and his Albion-based business partner Charles Moore moved to Chicago to raise one such building, the Matteson House, a large brick hotel. Pullman and Moore went on to raise several more Chicago buildings before becoming part of a consortium that raised the entire ninety-eight-metre-long block of four and five storey brick and stone buildings on the north side of Lake Street between Clark and La Salle Streets, a feat depicted by Edward Mendel in a large lithograph. In 1861 Pullman contracted with the Ely and Smith partnership to raise the six storey high Tremont House. Pullman contracted to raise these and many other large buildings in Chicago, and his firm raised the buildings on average six feet without causing them any damage and often times while the buildings were still fully operational, with people entering and exiting them and conducting business within.

=== Pullman sleeping car ===
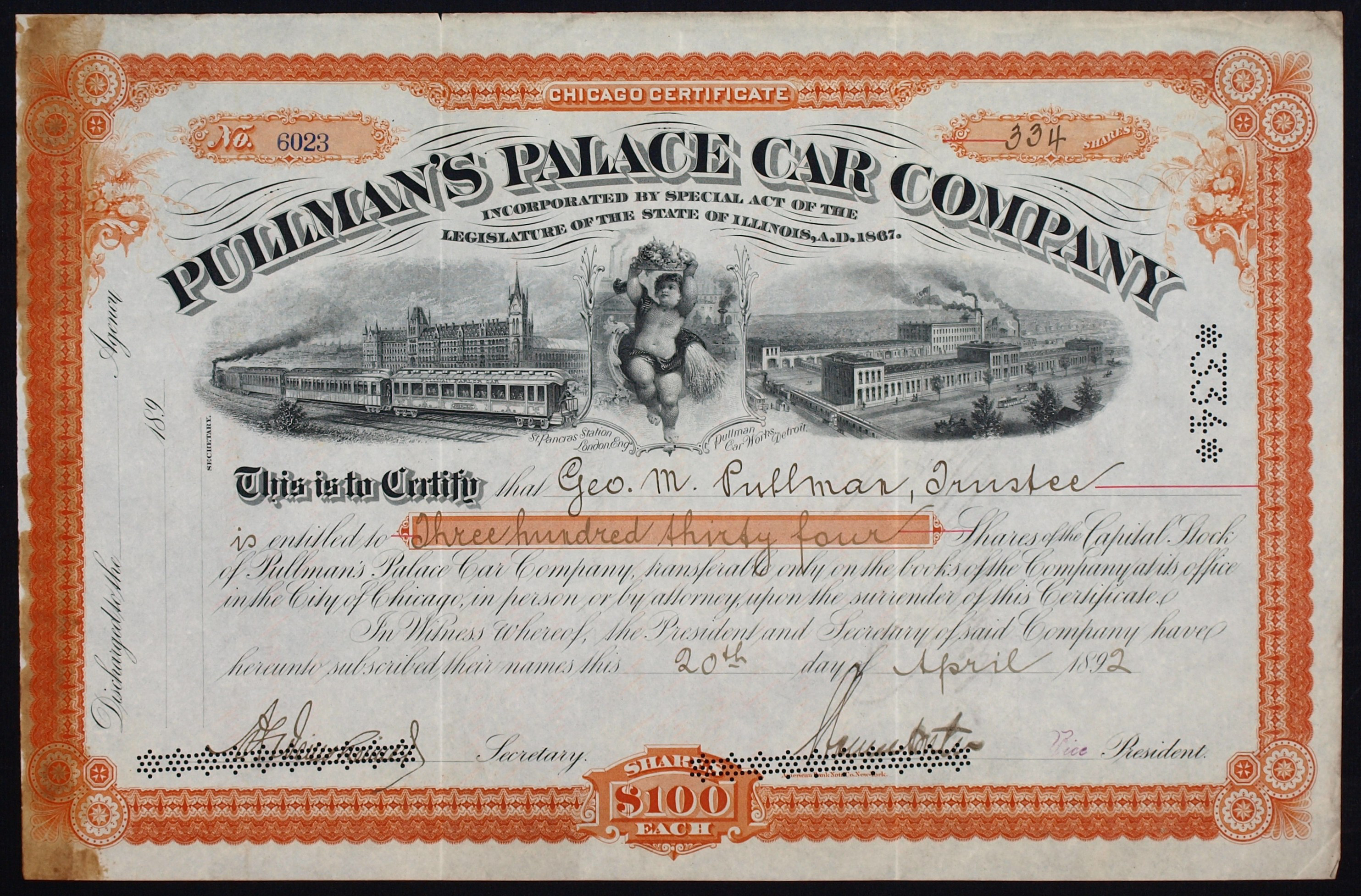
Share of the Pullman's Palace Car Company, issued April 20, 1892, made out to George M. Pullman

Pullman developed a railroad sleeping car, the Pullman sleeper or "palace car". These were designed after the packet boats that travelled the Erie Canal of his youth in Albion. The first one was finished in 1864.

After President Abraham Lincoln was assassinated, Pullman arranged to have his body carried from Washington, D.C., to Springfield on a sleeper, for which he gained national attention, as hundreds of thousands of people lined the route in homage. Lincoln's body was carried on the presidential train car that Lincoln himself had commissioned that year. Pullman had cars in the train, notably for the President's surviving family. Orders for his new car began to pour into his company. The sleeping cars proved successful although each cost more than five times the price of a regular railway car. They were marketed as "luxury for the middle class".

In 1867, Pullman introduced his first "hotel on wheels," the President, a sleeper with an attached kitchen and dining car. The food rivaled the best restaurants of the day and the service was impeccable. A year later in 1868, he launched the Delmonico, the world's first sleeping car devoted to fine cuisine. The Delmonico menu was prepared by chefs from New York's famed Delmonico's Restaurant.

Both the President and the Delmonico and subsequent Pullman sleeping cars offered first-rate service. The company hired African-American freedmen as Pullman porters. Many of the men had been former domestic slaves in the South. Their new roles required them to act as porters, waiters, valets, and entertainers, all rolled into one person. As they were paid relatively well and got to travel the country, the position became considered prestigious, and Pullman porters were respected in the black communities.

Pullman believed that if his sleeper cars were to be successful, he needed to provide a wide variety of services to travelers: collecting tickets, selling berths, dispatching wires, fetching sandwiches, mending torn trousers, converting day coaches into sleepers, etc. Pullman believed that former house slaves of the plantation South had the right combination of training to serve the businessmen who would patronize his "Palace Cars". Pullman became the biggest single employer of African Americans in post-Civil War America.

In 1869, Pullman bought out the Detroit Car and Manufacturing Company. Pullman bought the patents and business of his eastern competitor, the Central Transportation Company in 1870. In the spring of 1871, Pullman, Andrew Carnegie, and others bailed out the financially troubled Union Pacific; they took positions on its board of directors. By 1875, the Pullman firm owned $100,000 worth of patents, had 700 cars in operation, and had several hundred thousand dollars in the bank.

On February 25, 1881 Pullman posted a newspaper notice that stated he had formed a syndicate to buy controlling stock in the Northern Pacific Railroad. The syndicate, led by Pullman, was named the Oregon Improvement Company and key members were Pullman and William J. Endicott, Jr. The syndicate was led by Henry Villard who stated in his memoirs that he could not be a member of the syndicate for legal reasons. Henry Villard convinced Frederic Billings, the president of Northern Pacific Railroad, to sell his shares to the syndicate which acquired 60% of the railroad. Billings sold 50,000 shares that he had purchased for $1.50 and sold for $50 per share. Billings was in poor health, having Bright's disease, and was convinced that he should retire. Henry Villard became the new president of the Northern Pacific Railroad. Soon after this, the towns of Pullman and Endicott in Whitman County, Washington State were named for the two key members of the Oregon Improvement Company. The intention at the time was probably to encourage the Northern Pacific Railroad to build a railroad line to Whitman County in Washington State.

In 1887, Pullman designed and established the system of "vestibuled trains," with cars linked by covered gangways instead of open platforms. The vestibules were first put in service on the Pennsylvania Railroad trunk lines. The French social scientist Paul de Rousiers (1857–1934), who visited Chicago in 1890, wrote of Pullman's manufacturing complex, "Everything is done in order and with precision. One feels that some brain of superior intelligence, backed by a long technical experience, has thought out every possible detail."

== Pullman company town ==
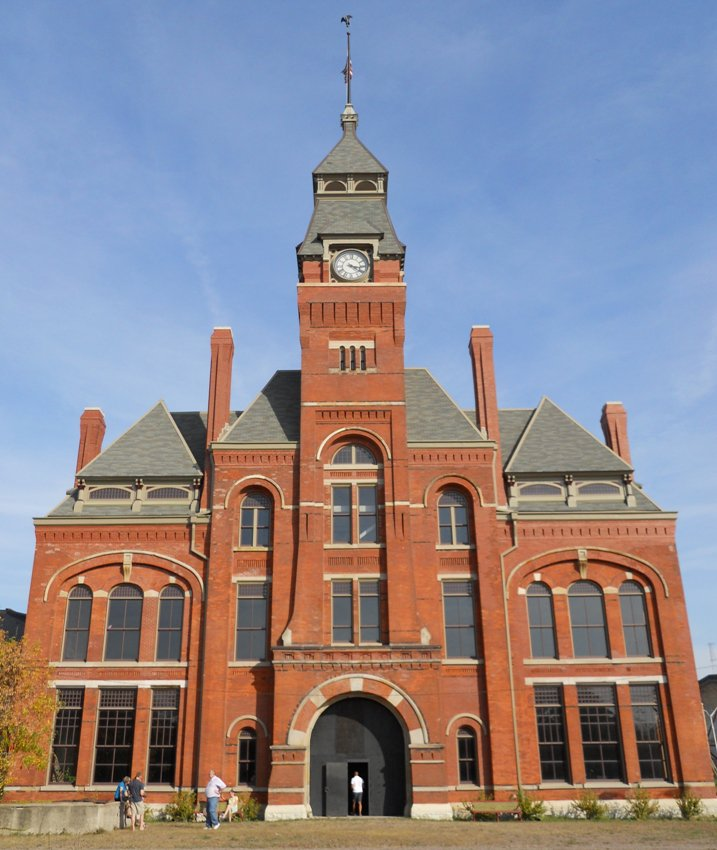
Administration building in Pullman

In 1880, Pullman bought 4,000 acres (16 km^{2}), near Lake Calumet some 14 mi (23 km) south of Chicago, on the Illinois Central Railroad for $800,000. Pullman hired Solon Spencer Beman to design his new plant there. Trying to solve the issue of labor unrest and poverty, he also built a company town adjacent to his factory; it featured housing, shopping areas, churches, theaters, parks, hotel and library for his factory employees. The 1300 original structures were entirely designed by Solon Spencer Beman. The centerpiece of the complex was the Administration Building and a man-made lake. The Hotel Florence, named for Pullman's daughter, was built nearby.

Pullman believed that the country air and fine facilities, without agitators, saloons and city vice districts, would result in a happy, loyal workforce. The model planned community became a leading attraction for visitors who attended the World's Columbian Exposition of 1893. It attracted nationwide attention. The national press praised Pullman for his benevolence and vision. According to mortality statistics, it was one of the most healthful places in the world.

The industrialist still expected the town to make money as an enterprise. By 1892, the community, profitable in its own right, was valued at over $5 million. Pullman ruled the town like a feudal baron. Pullman prohibited independent newspapers, public speeches, town meetings or open discussion. His inspectors regularly entered homes to inspect for cleanliness and could terminate workers' leases on ten days' notice. The church stood empty since no approved denomination would pay rent, and no other congregation was allowed. He prohibited private charitable organizations. In 1885 Richard Ely wrote in Harper's Weekly that the power exercised by Otto Von Bismarck (known as the unifier of modern Germany), was "utterly insignificant when compared with the ruling authority of the Pullman Palace Car Company in Pullman".

We are born in a Pullman house, fed from the Pullman shops, taught in the Pullman school, catechized in the Pullman Church, and when we die we shall go to the Pullman Hell.

— Some alleged Pullman employees living in the Pullman-owned town

The Pullman community is a historic district that has been listed on the National Register of Historic Places.

In the 1930s, Hotel Florence, named for Pullman's daughter, was one of the most popular brothels in the city.

Marktown, Indiana, Clayton Mark's planned worker community, was developed nearby.

=== Pullman Strike ===
In 1894, when manufacturing demand fell off, Pullman cut jobs and wages and increased working hours in his plant to lower costs and keep profits, but he did not lower rents or prices in the company town. The workers eventually launched a strike. When violence broke out, he gained the support of President Grover Cleveland for the use of United States troops. Cleveland sent in the troops, who harshly suppressed the strike in action that caused many injuries, over the objections of the Illinois governor, John Altgeld.

In the winter of 1893–94, at the start of a depression, Pullman decided to cut wages by 30%. This was not unusual in the age of the robber barons, but he didn't reduce the rent in Pullman, because he had guaranteed his investors a 6% return on their investments in the town. A workman might make $9.07 in a fortnight, and the rent of $9 would be taken directly out of his paycheck, leaving him with just 7 cents to feed his family. One worker later testified: "I have seen men with families of eight or nine children crying because they got only three or four cents after paying their rent." Another described conditions as "slavery worse than that of Negroes of the South".

On May 12, 1894, the workers went on strike.

The American Railway Union was led by Eugene Victor Debs, a pacifist and socialist who later founded the Socialist Party of America and was its candidate for president in five elections. Under the leadership of Debs, sympathetic railroad workers across the nation tied up rail traffic to the Pacific. The so-called "Debs Rebellion" had begun.

Arcade Building with strikers and soldiers Debs gave Pullman five days to respond to the union demands but Pullman refused even to negotiate (leading another industrialist to yell, "The damned idiot ought to arbitrate, arbitrate and arbitrate! ...A man who won't meet his own men halfway is a God-damn fool!"). Instead, Pullman locked up his home and business and left town.

On June 26, all Pullman cars were cut from trains. When union members were fired, entire rail lines were shut down, and Chicago was besieged. One consequence was a blockade of the federal mail, and Debs agreed to let isolated mail cars into the city. Rail owners mixed mail cars into all their trains however, and then called in the federal government when the mail failed to get through.

Debs could not pacify the pent-up frustrations of the exploited workers, and violence broke out between rioters and the federal troops that were sent to protect the mail. On July 8, soldiers began shooting strikers. That was the beginning of the end of the strike. By the end of the month, 34 people had been killed, the strikers were dispersed, the troops were gone, the courts had sided with the railway owners, and Debs was in jail for contempt of court.

Pullman's reputation was soiled by the strike, and then officially tarnished by the presidential commission that investigated the incident. The national commission report found Pullman's paternalism partly to blame and described Pullman's company town as "un-American". The report condemned Pullman for refusing to negotiate and for the economic hardships he created for workers in the town of Pullman. "The aesthetic features are admired by visitors, but have little money value to employees, especially when they lack bread." The State of Illinois filed suit, and in 1898, the Supreme Court of Illinois forced the Pullman Company to divest ownership in the town, which was annexed to Chicago.

== Death and burial ==
On October 19, 1897, Pullman died of a heart attack in Chicago, Illinois. He was 66 years old. Pullman was buried at Graceland Cemetery in Chicago, Illinois. George and his wife Hattie had four children: Florence, Harriett, George Jr. and Walter Sanger Pullman.

=== Burial ===
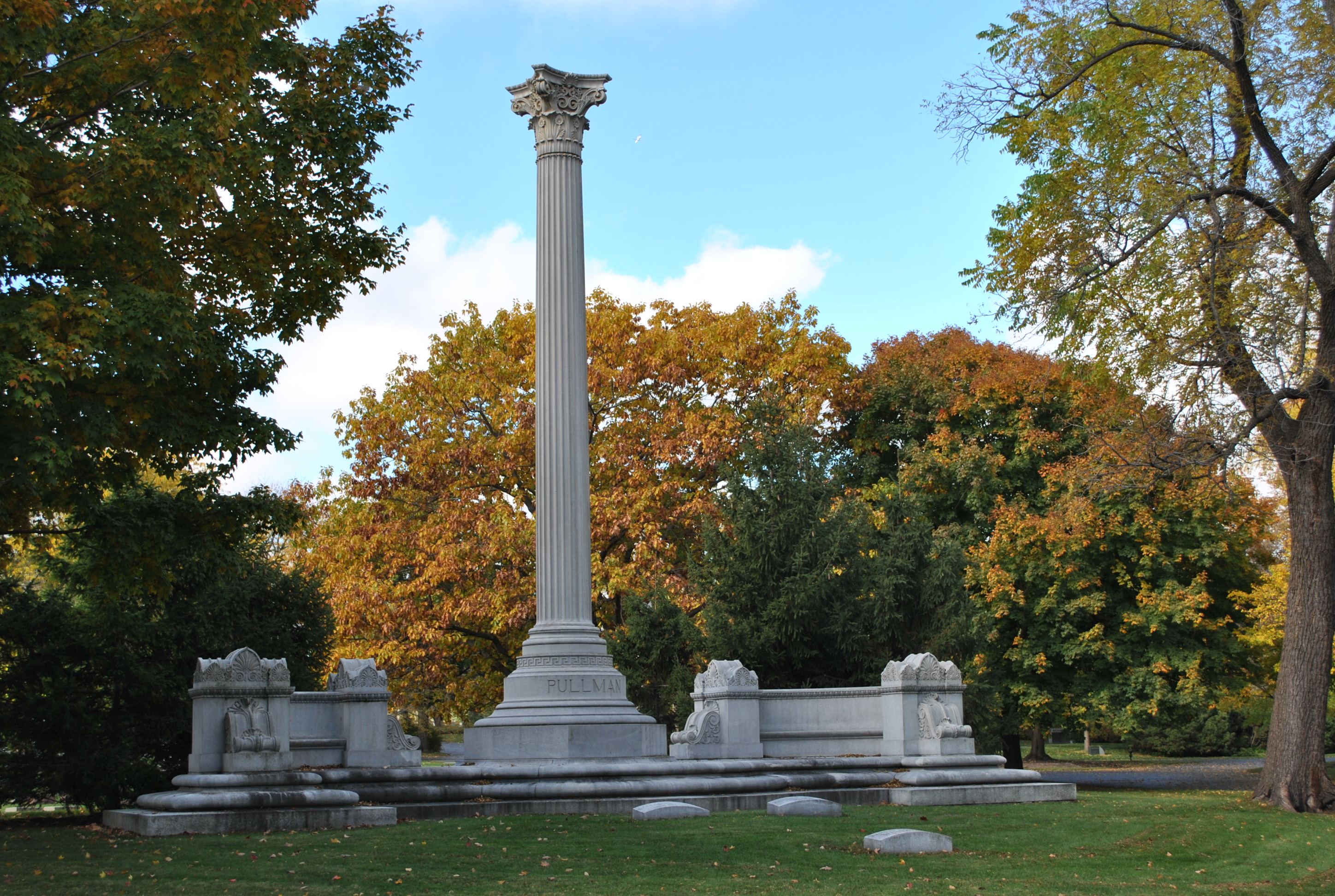
Tomb of George Pullman at Graceland Cemetery in Chicago

Fearing that some of his former employees or other labor supporters might try to dig up his body, his family arranged for his remains to be placed in a lead-lined mahogany coffin, which was then sealed inside a block of concrete. At the cemetery, a large pit had been dug at the family plot. At its base and walls were 18 inches of reinforced concrete. The coffin was lowered, and covered with asphalt and tar paper. More concrete was poured on top, followed by a layer of steel rails bolted together at right angles, and another layer of concrete. The entire burial process took two days. His monument, featuring a Corinthian column flanked by curved stone benches, was designed by Solon Spencer Beman, the architect of the company town of Pullman.

== Freemasonry ==
Pullman was initiated into Freemasonry in Renovation Lodge No. 97 in Albion, New York. He was also member of the Ancient and Accepted Scottish Rite of Freemasonry and received the honorary 33rd degree within that body.

== Public projects ==
Pullman was identified with various public enterprises, among them the Metropolitan elevated railway system of New York. It was constructed and opened to the public by a corporation of which he was president.

The Pullman Company merged in 1930 with Standard Steel Car Company to become Pullman-Standard, which built its last car for Amtrak in 1982. After delivery the Pullman-Standard plant stayed in limbo, and eventually shut down. In 1987, its remaining assets were absorbed by Bombardier.

== Legacy ==
- In Pullman's will, he bequeathed $1.2 million to establish the Pullman Free School of Manual Training for the children of employees of the Pullman Palace Car Company and the residents of the neighboring Roseland community. In 1950, the George M. Pullman Educational Foundation succeeded the Pullman Free School of Manual Training, also known as Pullman Tech, after it closed its doors in 1949. Located in Chicago, Illinois, the George M. Pullman Educational Foundation supports college-bound high school seniors with merit-based, need-based scholarships to attend the college of their choice. Since its founding, the Foundation has awarded approximately $30 million to over 13,000 outstanding Cook County students.
- The city of Pullman, Washington, is named in his honor. The town expected him to influence the Northern Pacific Railroad to build railroads to Pullman since he was the head of the Oregon Improvement Company that owned 60% of the Railroad. The initial route went into Spokane but between 1885 and 1889 railroads were built to Pullman Washington.
- The Pullman Memorial Universalist Church (1894) in Albion, New York, was funded and built by Pullman in memory of his parents.
- The SS George M. Pullman, a Liberty Ship built in World War II, was named for him.

== See also ==
- 10,000 Black Men Named George
- Pullman porter
- Pullman, Chicago
- The Brotherhood of Sleeping Car Porters, organized after Pullman's death, was a leading African-American union.
