= Electrolier =

Fixture for holding electric lamps

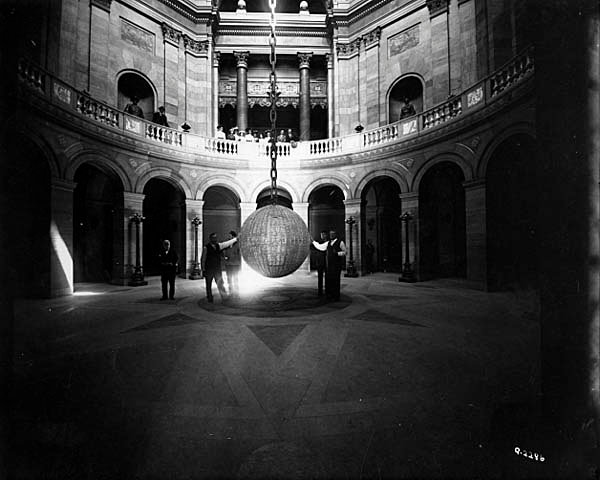
This 1.8-metre-diameter (6 ft) crystal electrolier (chandelier) hangs from the dome of the Minnesota State Capitol rotunda. A manual winch originally lowered it about 37 m (120 ft) to the floor for maintenance, as seen in the c. 1910 photograph.

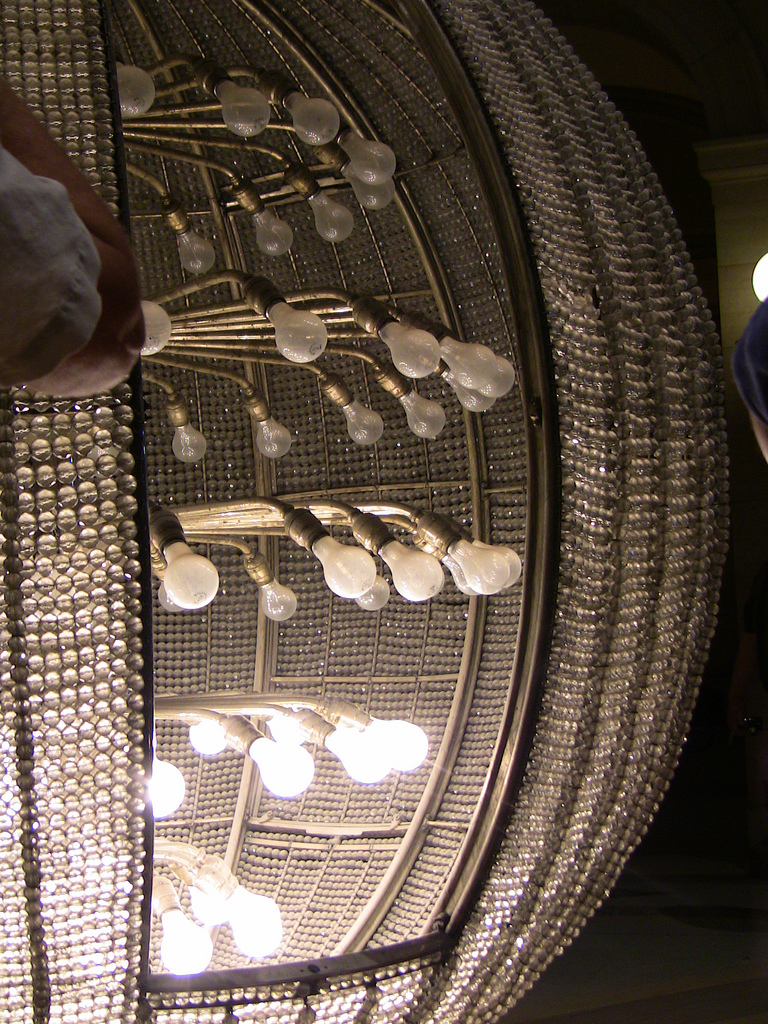
Access door of the Minnesota State Capitol electrolier open to show bulbs

Electrolier is a light fixture that holds electric lamps. Normally, the term designates an elaborate light fixture suspended from above, such as a large, multi-bulb pendant light. Additionally, the term is used by architects in the United States to refer to electric street lights or any exterior light fixture mounted on a pole or standard. The word is analogous to chandelier, from which it was formed.

An example usage of the term is found in Sir John Betjeman's poem "The Metropolitan Railway - Baker Street Station Buffet" from his collection "A Few Late Chrysanthemums" (1954): "Early Electric! With what radiant hope / Men formed this many-branched electrolier, / Twisted the flex around the iron rope / And let the dazzling vacuum globes hang clear, / And then with hearts the rich contrivance fill'd / Of copper, beaten by the Bromsgrove Guild."

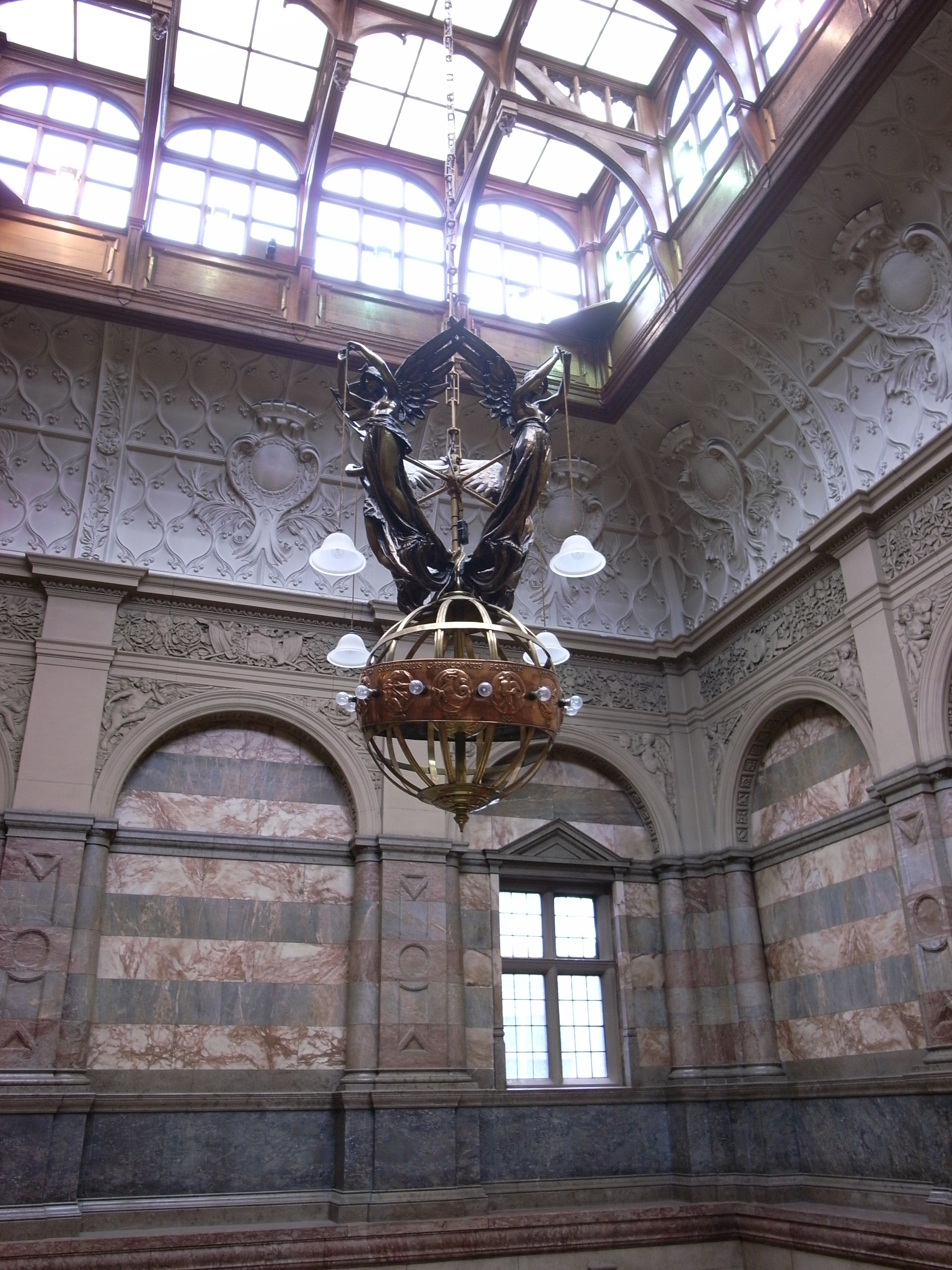
Electrolier in the Grand Staircase of Sheffield Town Hall, England

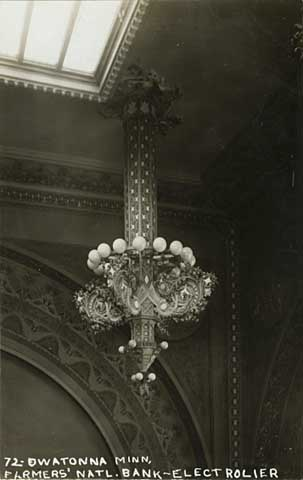
Electrolier in the National Farmer's Bank of Owatonna, Minnesota Postcard c. 1910

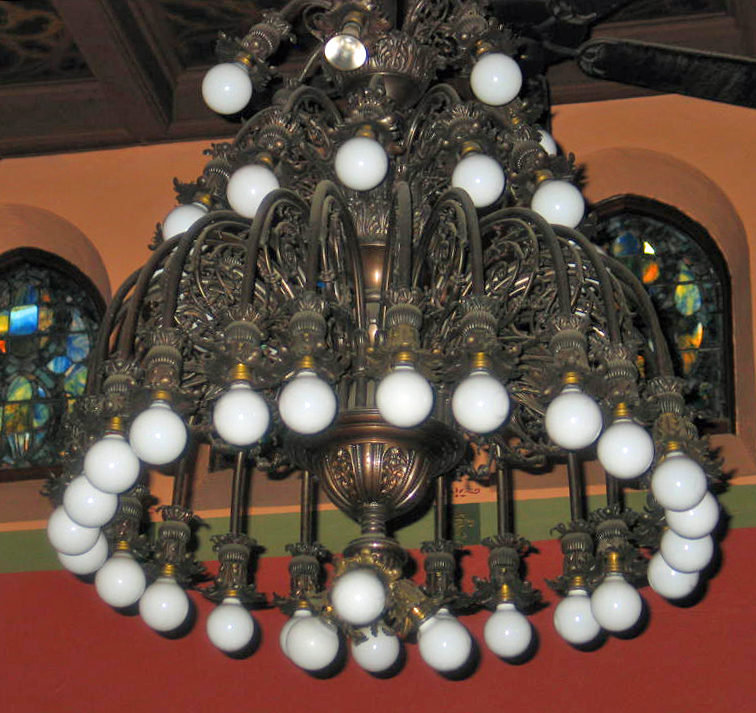
1894 bronze electrolier with 45 branches in Pullman Memorial Universalist Church, Albion, NY
