= Hotel Florence =

Hotel in Chicago, Illinois

- U.S. Historic district – Contributing property
- Illinois State Historic Site
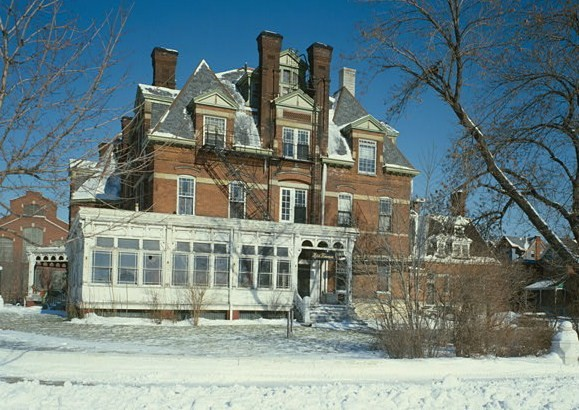
- Hotel Florence
- Location: 11111 S. Forrestville Ave., Chicago, Illinois
- Built: 1881
- Architect: Solon Spencer Beman
- Architectural style: Gothic Revival
- Part of: Pullman Historic District (ID69000054)
- Added to NRHP: October 8, 1969

The Hotel Florence is a former hotel located in the Pullman Historic District on the far south side of Chicago, Illinois. It was built in 1881 to a design by architect Solon Spencer Beman. Since 1991, it has been owned by the Illinois Historic Preservation Agency.

== History ==
The years following the American Civil War saw the growth of a new profession—that of drummer or traveling salesman. The traveling salesman was often assigned a "territory" or quota of sales calls to make that necessitated traveling day and night by train when in the field. In order to meet the needs of traveling salesmen and other nighttime travelers, Chicago inventor George Pullman helped to invent the sleeping car, a railroad passenger car whose seats could be converted into sleeping bunks.

The Pullman sleeping car was enormously successful. Many railroads preferred the Pullman design to other sleeping cars because of the efforts George Pullman and his employees put into standardizing their manufacture. A railroad could be confident that many Pullman cars were interchangeable with each other. This helped railroads borrow and lend sleeping cars to each other, and create sleeping-car trains that used the tracks of two or more railroads.

Starting in 1880, George Pullman led the design of a company town that was to be the climax of his career—Pullman, Illinois. The land by the Illinois Central Railroad tracks near Lake Calumet had not yet been annexed by Chicago, and Pullman could build and run it himself. And he did.

The Pullman factories soon themselves became the focus of attention by salesmen from all over the world. Suppliers of iron, steel, upholstery, and many other commodities needed for the manufacture of sleeping cars descended upon Pullman. The industrial magnate approved the design, by architect Solon Spencer Beman, and the construction of the new 50-room Hotel Florence to rent rooms to these supply representatives. The hotel cost $100,000 (in gold-standard dollars) to build. George Pullman named the hotel after his oldest daughter, Florence Pullman. The most luxurious suite in the hotel, the Pullman Suite, was designed for the personal use of George Pullman and his family. The hotel could also offer first-class accommodations to railroad CEOs who came to Pullman to do business with the firm. The hotel opened to guests on November 1, 1881.

The hotel was off limits to Pullman workers. George Pullman did not want his laborers to drink, and banned the sale of alcohol within town limits. An exception was made for guests of the Hotel Florence, however. A bar served whiskey and other beverages inside the hotel. A hotel restaurant specialized in pork chops, which entered the hotel menu in 1902.

== Today ==
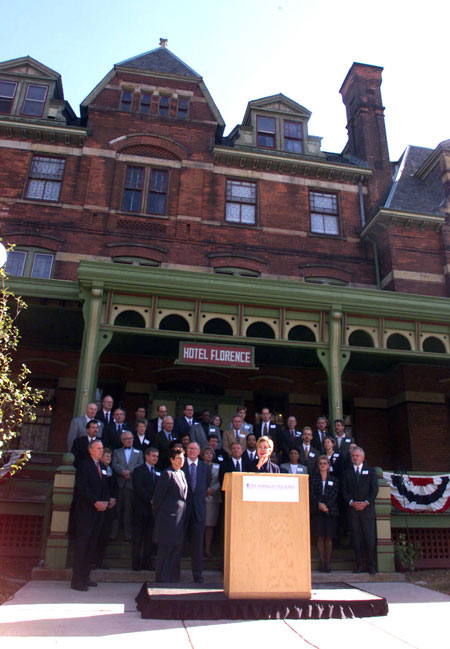
Then-First Lady Hillary Clinton delivers a speech in front of the Hotel Florence in October 1998

George Pullman's control over his company town began to come apart in 1889 when the city of Chicago annexed Pullman and its surroundings and began to extend its ordinances over the neighborhood. Another blow was the bitter strike in 1894 led by labor leader Eugene Debs. George Pullman died in 1897.

Under Pullman's successor, Robert T. Lincoln, the sleeping-car business continued to expand into the twentieth century, and the Hotel Florence built a major addition, the Annex, in the 1910s. This was, however, the decade that marked a peak for the American passenger railroad industry. With the growth of the automobile industry, travelers and salesmen began to drive themselves around. Almost all of the American railroads still offering night train services relinquished them to Amtrak in 1971. The sleeping-car business died.

The Historic Pullman Foundation purchased the hotel in 1975 to save it from demolition; the Illinois Historic Preservation Agency took title in 1991. The Hotel is currently closed for renovations and the State of Illinois hopes to have it open before 2025.

== Sources ==
This article incorporates text from a free content work. Licensed under Public domain (US Government source). Text taken from Hotel Florence, National Park Service.
