= Pullman, Chicago =

Community area in Chicago, Illinois

Pullman
- Community area
- Community Area 50 - Pullman
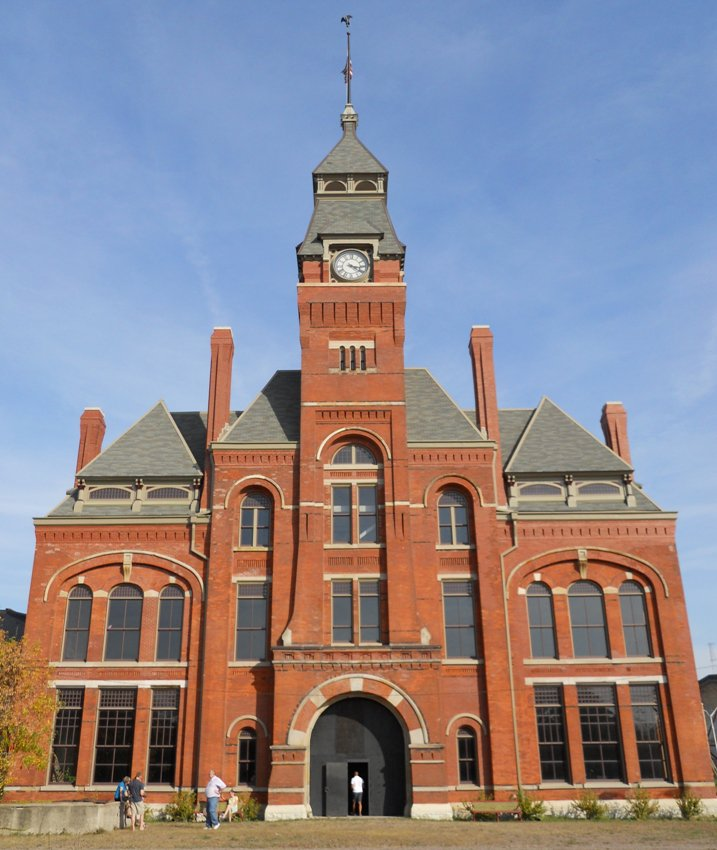
- The former Pullman Clock Tower and Administration Building, opened as the Pullman National Monument Visitor Center in September 2021.

- Location within the city of Chicago
- Coordinates: 41°42.6′N 87°37.2′W
- Country: United States
- State: Illinois
- County: Cook
- City: Chicago
- Named for: George Pullman
- Neighborhoods: list: Cottage Grove Heights; Pullman; Kensington

Area
  - Total: 2.11 sq mi (5.46 km^{2})

Population (2024)
  - Total: 6,744

Demographics 2024
  - White: 12.4%
  - Black: 77.1%
  - Hispanic: 7.7%
  - Asian: 1.4%
  - Other: 1.3%

Educational Attainment 2024
  - High School Diploma or Higher: 90.5%
  - Bachelor's Degree or Higher: 35.9%
- Time zone: UTC-6 (CST)
  - Summer (DST): UTC-5 (CDT)
- ZIP Codes: parts of 60628
- Median household income: $43,539
- Source: U.S. Census, Record Information Services

Pullman, one of Chicago's 77 defined community areas, is a neighborhood located on the city's South Side. Twelve miles from the Chicago Loop, Pullman is situated adjacent to Lake Calumet.

The area known as Pullman encompasses a much wider area than its two historic areas (the older historic area is often referred to as "Pullman" and is a Chicago Landmark district and a national historical park. The northern annex historic area is usually referred to as "North Pullman"). The development built by the Pullman Company is bounded by 103rd Street on the North, 115th Street on the South, the railroad tracks on the East and Cottage Grove on the West.

Since the late 20th century, the Pullman neighborhood has been gentrifying. Many residents are involved in the restoration of their own homes, and projects throughout the district as a whole. Walking tours of Pullman are available.

Pullman has many historic and architecturally significant buildings; among these are the Hotel Florence; the Arcade Building, which was destroyed in the 1920s; the Clock Tower and Factory, the complex surrounding Market Square, and Greenstone Church. In the adjacent Kensington neighborhood of the nearby Roseland district is the home of one of the many beautiful churches in Chicago built in Polish Cathedral style, the former church of St. Salomea. It is now used by Salem Baptist Church of Chicago.

In a contest sponsored by the Illinois Department of Commerce and Economic Opportunity, Pullman was one of seven sites nominated for the Illinois Seven Wonders.

== History ==
=== Beginnings ===
Historic Pullman was built in the 1880s by George Pullman as workers' housing for employees of his railroad car company, the Pullman Palace Car Company. He established behavioral standards that workers had to meet to live in the area and charged them rent. Pullman's architect, Solon Spencer Beman, was said to be extremely proud that he had met all the workers' needs within the neighborhood he designed. The distinctive rowhouses were comfortable by standards of the day, and contained such amenities as indoor plumbing, gas, and sewers.

=== Pullman Strike ===
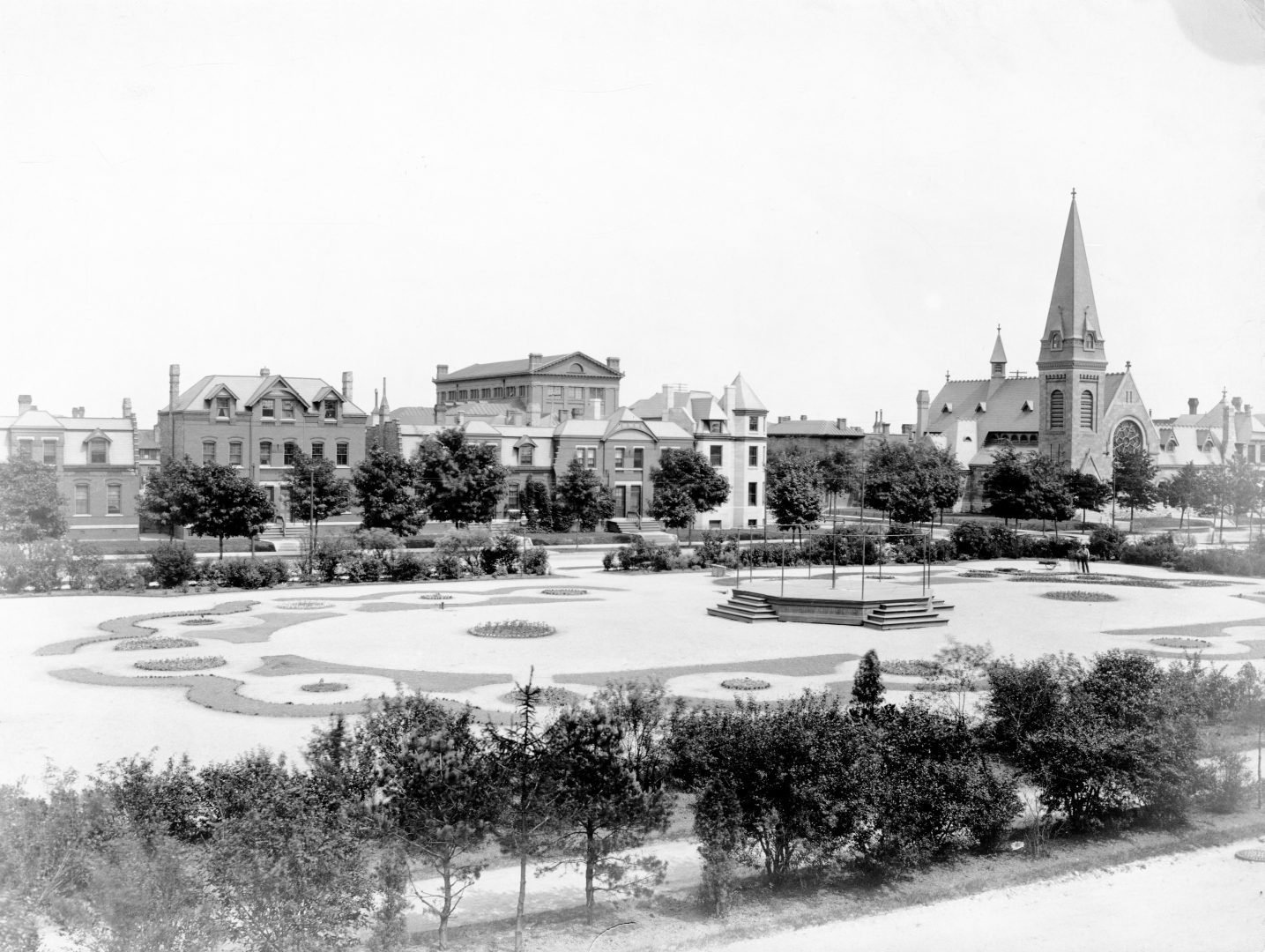
Pullman in the late 19th century

During the depression that followed the Panic of 1893, demand for Pullman cars slackened. The Pullman company laid off hundreds of workers and switched many more to pay-per-piece work. This work, while paying more per hour, reduced total worker income. Despite these cutbacks, the Company did not reduce rents for workers who lived in the town of Pullman.

Workers initiated the Pullman Strike in 1894, and it lasted for 2 months, eventually leading to intervention by the US government and military. The Strike Commission, set up in 1894, ruled that the aesthetic features admired by visitors had little monetary value for employees.

=== Incorporation into Chicago ===
After George Pullman died in 1897, the Illinois Supreme Court required the company to sell the town because operating it was outside the company's charter. In 1899, the town and other major portions of the South Side were annexed by the city of Chicago. Within ten years, the city sold the houses to their occupants. After the strike, Pullman gradually was absorbed as a regular Chicago neighborhood, defined by distinguishing Victorian architecture. But the fortunes of the neighborhood continued to rise and fall with the Pullman Company for many years.

=== Deindustrialization ===
With industrial and railroad restructuring beginning in the 1950s, many jobs were lost in the city. The neighborhood gradually declined along with work opportunities and income. People began to move to newer housing in the suburbs. In 1960 the original Town of Pullman, approximately between 103rd and 115th Streets, was threatened with total demolition for an industrial park. Forming the Pullman Civic Organization, the residents lobbied the city and saved their community. It reached its peak of population in 1970.

=== Revival ===
By 1972 the Pullman Historic District had obtained National, State, and City landmark status to protect the original 900 rowhouses and public buildings built by George Pullman. (It was designated a National Historic Landmark District in 1969 and listed on the National Register of Historic Places. In 1970 it was designated as a State landmark by the Illinois Historic Preservation Agency; and in 1972, South Pullman was declared a City of Chicago Landmark). To protect the character of the historic districts, the city has established guidelines for new building and renovation, administered by the City of Chicago. These are explained in the Beman Committee's Homeowner's Guide (the committee is named after Pullman's original architect, Solon Spencer Beman).

The district was designated the Pullman National Monument under President Obama in February 2015 and re-designated a national historical park in December 2022.

== Demographics ==
Historical population
Census	Pop.	Note	%±
1930	6,705		—
1940	6,523		−2.7%
1950	8,899		36.4%
1960	8,412		−5.5%
1970	10,965		30.3%
1980	10,341		−5.7%
1990	9,344		−9.6%
2000	8,921		−4.5%
2010	7,325		−17.9%
2020	6,820		−6.9%

The Pullman community area is a predominantly African American, older community area, though this is not consistent among each of its neighborhoods. According to a June 2017 analysis by the Chicago Metropolitan Agency for Planning, there were 6,501 people and 2,894 households in Pullman. The racial makeup of the area was 7.1% White, 82.8% African American, 0.5% Asian, 1.1% from other races. Residents who identified as Hispanic or Latino of any race were 8.5% of the population. In the area, the population's age distribution was spread out, with 23.6% under the age of 19, 20.8% from 20 to 34, 19.6% from 35 to 49, 20.2% from 50 to 64, and 15.8% who were 65 years of age or older. The median age was 40 years compared to a citywide figure of 33 years.

The Pullman neighborhood is 29% White, 31% African American, and residents of any race who identify as Hispanic or Latino comprise 36% of the neighborhood's 1,422 residents. (Note: Census Tract 5003, Cook, IL and Pullman neighborhood are coterminous.) By contrast, 96% of North Pullman's 1,995 residents are African American and 98% of Cottage Grove Heights' 3,084 residents are African American. (Note: Census Tract 5002, Cook, IL and North Pullman neighborhood are coterminous.) (Note: Census Tract 5001, Cook, IL and Cottage Grove Heights are coterminous.)

== Media and entertainment ==
Pullman has been featured in several major motion pictures. Road to Perdition (starring Tom Hanks and Paul Newman) was filmed in historic Pullman, with scenes featuring the factory and how it "once was" with workers, as well as many other scenes of the neighborhood. The 1993 film The Fugitive had several key scenes in Pullman. Harrison Ford was featured in a local bar, next running down an alley, and over the tops of several Pullman rowhouses. In April 2007, Universal Studios filmed The Express: The Ernie Davis Story, which also featured several scenes in Pullman.

Scenes from The Polar Express at the North Pole were based on Pullman architecture. Santa Claus emerges from a building based on the Pullman Company Administration Building; other buildings were based on the architectural style in Pullman. Robert Zemeckis, who directed the movie, grew up in the Roseland neighborhood near Pullman. The Untouchables with Sean Connery and Kevin Costner 1987 had some major scenes filmed in Pullman On November 12, 2006, Historic Pullman was the topic of the HGTV television show National Open House, which featured a Pullman house at 112th Street and Langley.

== Politics ==
Pullman is a stronghold for the Democratic Party. In the Presidential Election of 2020, Joe Biden won the Pullman District with 445 votes, with 21 cast for Donald Trump and five for third-party candidates.

In the 2016 presidential election, Pullman cast 3,123 votes for Hillary Clinton and cast 100 votes Donald Trump. Despite winning 94.92% of the vote, it was Clinton's 25th largest share of the vote by percentage in the 76 community areas she won in heavily Democratic Chicago. In the 2012 presidential election, Pullman cast 3,521 votes for Barack Obama and 77 votes for Mitt Romney. Despite winning 97.43% of the vote, it was Obama's 25th largest share of the vote by percentage in the 76 community areas he won in heavily Democratic Chicago.

At the local level, Pullman is located in Chicago's 8th and 9th wards represented by Democratic Alderwoman Michelle Harris and Democratic Alderman Anthony Beale respectively.

== Transportation ==
Pullman is served by two Metra Electric District stations; 115th Street/Kensington station and 111th Street/Pullman station. Most Metra suburban express trains passing through the area stop at the 115th Street station, and only local trains stop at the 111th Street station.

== Notable people ==
- Robert Fioretti, member of the Chicago City Council (2007–2015). Fioretti, who represented a ward on the West Side, was born in Pullman.
- Mark Konkol, journalist and winner of the 2011 Pulitzer Prize for Local Reporting. As of 2007, he resided in the Pullman community.
- Darrell Walker, professional basketball player. He attended school in Pullman.

== Education ==
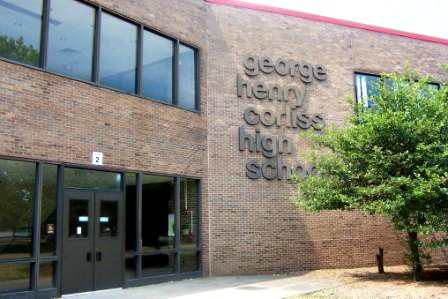
Corliss High School

Pullman is located in City of Chicago School District #299 and City Colleges of Chicago District #508. Pullman is zoned to the following elementary schools; Schmid Elementary School, Wendell Smith Elementary School, Edgar Allan Poe Classical School, and George M. Pullman School. The majority of Pullman is zoned to the Pullman located Corliss High School, while some the northeastern area is zoned to Harlan Community Academy High School in nearby Chatham The main campus of Olive-Harvey College, part of the City Colleges of Chicago system is located in Pullman.

== See also ==
- Granite City, Illinois (another company town)
- Marktown (another company town)
- West Pullman, Chicago (adjacent neighborhood where workers fled the Pullman town's grip)
- List of African-American neighborhoods
- History of African Americans in Chicago
