= Lake Calumet =

Lake in Chicago, Illinois, United States

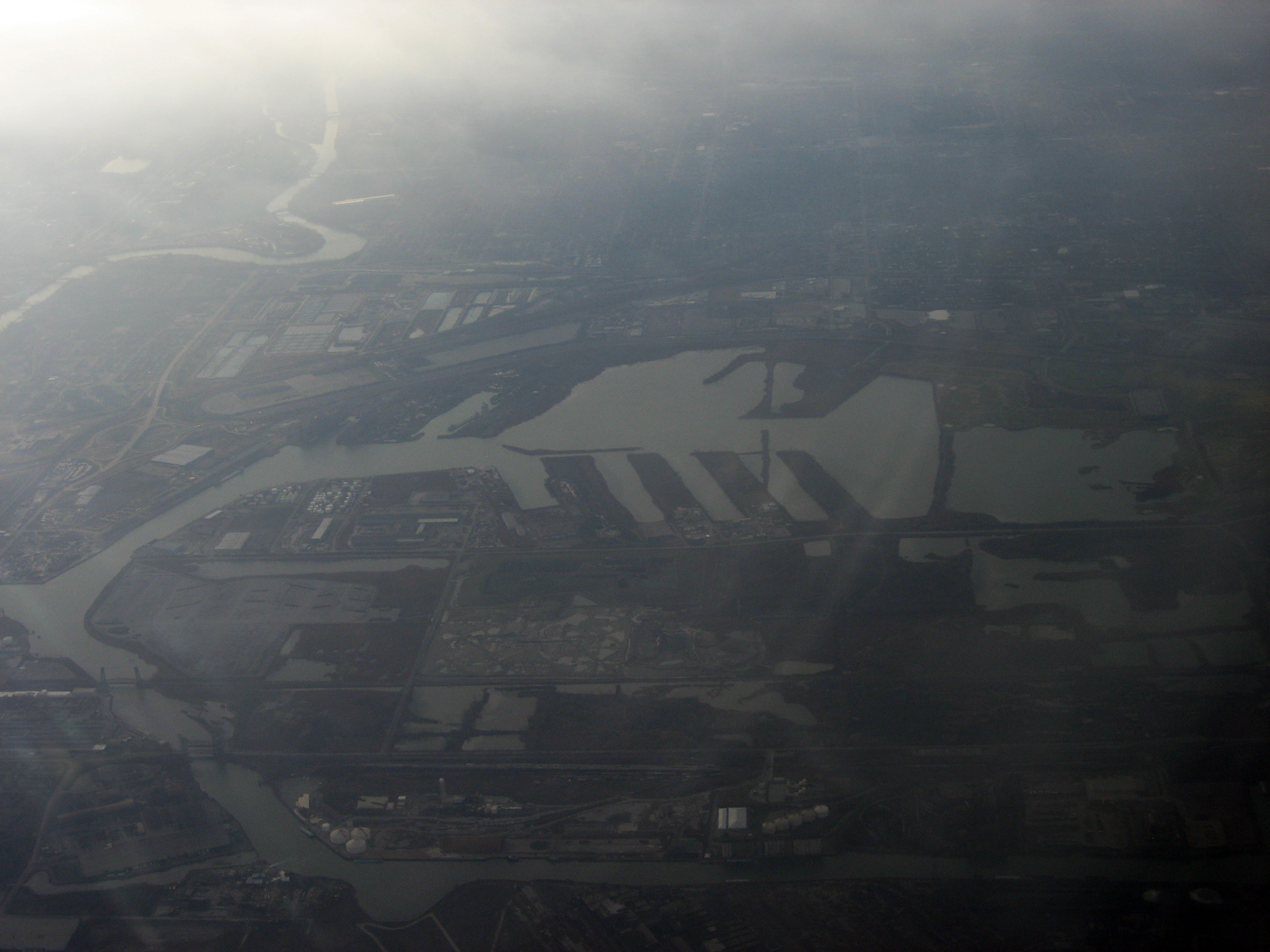
- Aerial shot of Lake Calumet

- Location within Chicago metropolitan area Location within Illinois Location within the United States
- Location: Chicago, Illinois
- Coordinates: 41°40′48″N 87°35′24″W
- Primary outflows: Des Plaines River
- Basin countries: United States

Lake Calumet is the largest body of water within the city of Chicago. Formerly a shallow, postglacial lake draining into Lake Michigan, it was transformed into an industrial harbor during the 20th century. Parts of the lake have been dredged, and other parts reshaped by landfill. Following the completion of the Cal-Sag Channel in 1922, which reversed the flow of the Calumet River, the lake drains into the Des Plaines River via the channel instead of Lake Michigan.

Calumet is a Norman word used since the 17th century by French colonists in Canada for the ceremonial pipes they saw used by First Nations peoples.

== Overview ==
Lake Calumet is located east of the Bishop Ford Freeway (Interstate 94) between 103rd and 130th streets on the Far Southeast Side of Chicago. It lies within the South Deering community area. The lake is operated as a component of the Port of Chicago.

== History ==
Until the 1800s, Lake Calumet was near the center of an extensive wetland area near the southern tip of Lake Michigan. Like other wetland areas, the Lake Calumet area and its rivers were a center of Native American life and settlement. In 1861, the Lake Calumet region was mapped into Hyde Park Township, south of what was then the town of Chicago. In the 1880s, because the lake's Calumet River created shipping opportunities to connect into Lake Michigan, the swampy zone was rapidly filled and developed by industry. Hyde Park Township developed rapidly and was annexed into Chicago in 1889. The area remains heavily industrialized today.

The Chicago neighborhood of Pullman was developed as a company town with residences and services offered for rent to the workers in railroad passenger car factories. The complex, now a National Monument, is sited on the lake's west shore. Steel mills began to line the Calumet River. The Illinois Central railroad was built nearby.

In the 1950s, part of the former lakebed was used as a right-of-way for a freeway, which was originally named in the lake's honor as the Calumet Expressway.

The lake was deepened in 1958 and large slips were added with the intent to harbor large ocean-going freighters anticipated after the opening of the St. Lawrence Seaway. However, the increased traffic never truly materialized, and the port infrastructure largely lay dormant.

Another parcel of former wetland, south of the lake, was designated as what is now the Paxton Landfill, the final home for much of the household and industrial solid waste generated within the city of Chicago. Some of the landfill was steel mill slag and other industrial wastes. The revelation of hazardous chemicals in much of the fill material has created a push to have parts of the Lake Calumet area added to the national Superfund list for environmental cleanup.

In the early 1980s, the Lake Calumet area was proposed as a site for the later-cancelled Chicago 1992 World's Fair.

In 1996, the Calumet Expressway was renamed the Bishop Ford Freeway, honoring Chicago religious leader Bishop Louis Henry Ford.

== Today ==
Lake Calumet is a unit of the Illinois International Port District (IIPD), a municipal corporation created in 1951 whose purpose is to redevelop the lake as a multi-purpose and multimodal transport complex. The 36-hole Harborside International Golf Center was developed at the north end of the lake in 1995. The lake is home to multiple industrial tenants, the largest being Kinder Morgan, an energy intrastructure company specializing in the transport of oil and natural gas.

== Ecology ==
The wetlands surrounding Lake Calumet were noted as the only location where specimens of Thismia americana, an example of endemic wet prairie flora, were ever collected. Due to the profound physical changes that have taken place in the Lake Calumet catchment area, this plant is now believed to be extinct.

Although Lake Calumet has undergone extensive human alteration over the period from 1880 through 2010, parts of the basin remain a wetland. The basin has been designated an Important Bird Area of Illinois and is part of the flyway along Lake Michigan and the rivers.

=== Superfund status ===
On March 2, 2010, the EPA designated the Lake Calumet Cluster, a cluster of sites grouped around Lake Calumet, for the Superfund List. Several local areas within this cluster are extremely hazardous; excavation workers must use masks and self-contained supplies of air or oxygen.

Despite these challenges, planners hope to conduct remedial cleanups of less-severely contaminated sites to permit adaptive reuse. They will cap the more heavily contaminated sites within the cluster. Landfill gas could be collected and the methane filtered for use.
