= Tunnel and Reservoir Plan =

American civil engineering project

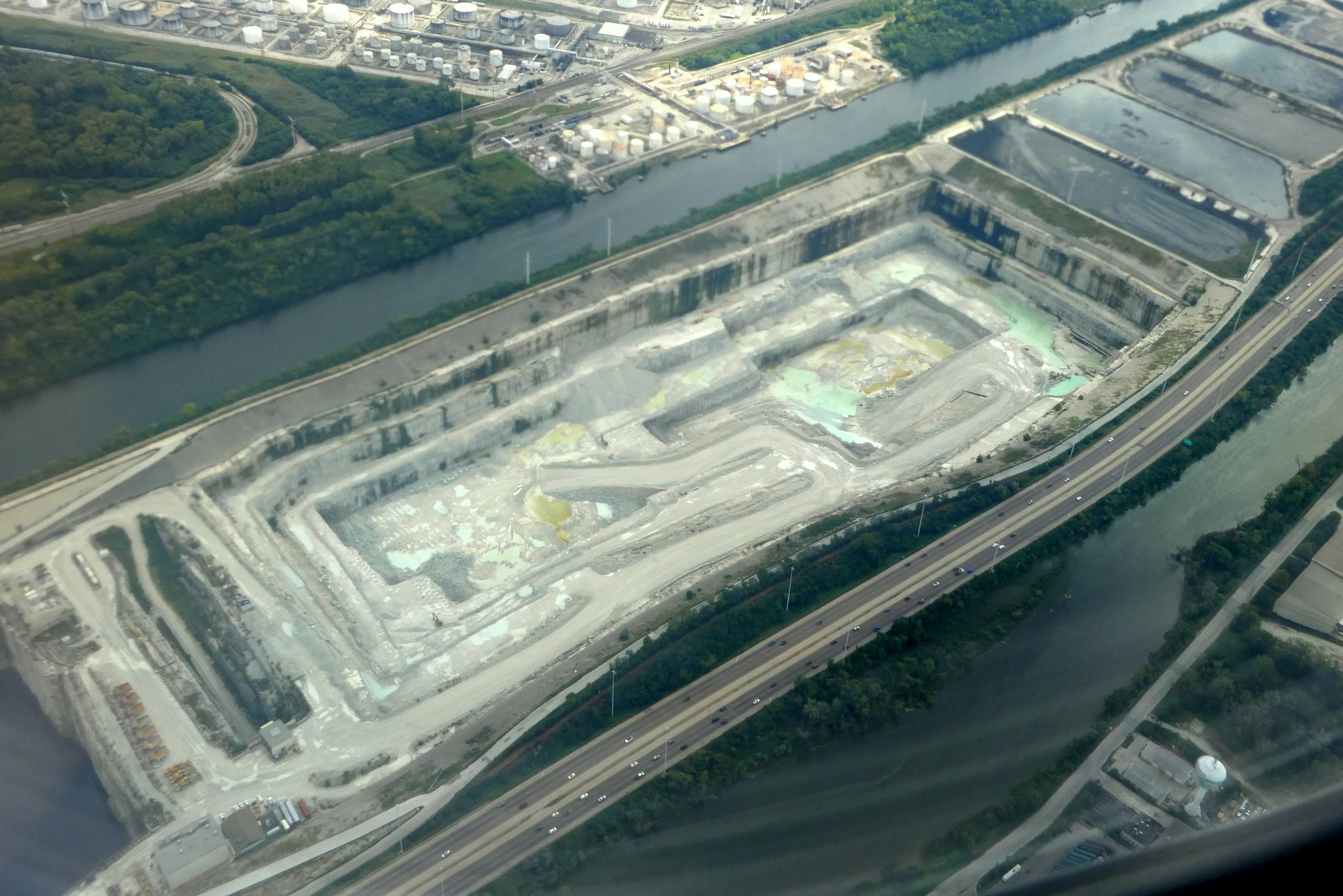
Aerial view of Phase II of the McCook Reservoir under construction in 2023

The Tunnel and Reservoir Plan (abbreviated TARP and more commonly known as the Deep Tunnel Project or the Chicago Deep Tunnel) is a large civil engineering project that aims to reduce flooding in the metropolitan Chicago area, and to reduce the harmful effects of flushing raw sewage into Lake Michigan by diverting storm water and sewage into temporary holding reservoirs. The megaproject is one of the largest civil engineering projects ever undertaken in terms of scope, cost and timeframe. Commissioned in the mid-1970s, the project is managed by the Metropolitan Water Reclamation District of Greater Chicago. Completion of the system is not anticipated until 2032, but substantial portions of the system have already opened and are currently operational. Across 30 years of construction, over $3 billion has been spent on the project.

== History ==
=== 19th century ===
The Deep Tunnel Project is the latest in a series of civil engineering projects dating back to 1834. Many of the problems experienced by the city of Chicago are directly related to its low level topography and the fact that the city is largely built upon marsh or wet prairie. This combined with a temperate wet climate and the human development of open land, leads to substantial water runoff. Lake Michigan was ineffective in carrying sewage away from the city, and in the event of a rainstorm, the water pumps that provided drinking water to Chicagoans became contaminated with sewage. Though no epidemics were caused by this system (see Chicago 1885 cholera epidemic myth), it soon became clear that the sewage system needed to be diverted to flow away from Lake Michigan in order to handle an increasing population's sanitation needs.

Between 1864 and 1867, under the leadership of Ellis S. Chesbrough, the city built the two-mile Chicago lake tunnel to a new water intake location farther from the shore. Crews began from the intake location and the shore, tunneling in two shifts a day. Clay and earth were drawn away by mule-drawn railcars. Masons lined the five-foot-diameter tunnel with two layers of brick. The lake and shore crews met in November 1866, less than seven inches out of alignment. A second tunnel was added in 1874.

In 1871, the deepening of the Illinois and Michigan Canal was completed to reverse the flow of the Chicago River to drain diluted sewage southwest away from Lake Michigan. However, the canal only had the capacity to drain to the Des Plaines River during dry weather; during heavy rains, the Des Plaines would flood and overflow into the canal, reversing its flow back into the lake. In 1900, to improve general health standards, the flow of the main branch of the Chicago River was permanently reversed with the construction of the Chicago Sanitary and Ship Canal. This further improved the sanitation of Lake Michigan and helped to prevent further waterborne epidemic scares.

=== 20th century ===
The construction of the Sanitary and Ship Canal (1892–1900), enlargements to the North Shore Channel (1907–1910), the construction of the Cal-Sag Channel (1911–1922), and the construction of locks at the mouth of the Chicago River (1933–1938) brought further improvements to the sanitary issues of the time. These projects blocked further amounts of sewage from draining into Lake Michigan. The projects also brought fresh lake water to inland waterways to further dilute sewage that was already in the waterways.

Surrounding farmland also engaged in flood control projects. The Illinois Farm Drainage Act of 1879 established drainage districts. These districts were generally named for the basin they drained—for example, the Fox River Drainage District. After World War II, suburban communities began to realize the benefits of separating stormwater from sewage water and began to construct separate sewer and storm drainage lines. The primary benefit of wastestream separation is that storm water requires less treatment than sewage before being returned to the environment.

Flood damage grew markedly after 1938, when surrounding natural drainage areas were lost to development and human activity. Serious flooding has occurred in the Chicago metropolitan area in 1849, 1855, 1885, 1938, 1952, 1954, 1957, 1961, 1973, 1979, 1986, 1987, 1996, 2007, 2008, 2010, 2011, 2022, 2023 — but most record-setting crests occurred after 1948.

In the 1960s, the concept of Deep Tunnel was studied and recommended as a solution to continuing flooding issues.

== Status ==
Phase 1, the creation of 109.4 miles (176.1 km) of drainage tunnels ranging from 9 to 33 feet (2.7 to 10.1 m) in diameter, up to 350 feet (110 m) underground, was adopted in 1972, commenced in 1975, and completed and operational by 2006. Phase 2, creation of reservoirs primarily intended for flood control, remains underway with an expected completion date of 2032. Currently, up to 2.3 billion US gallons (8.7 gigalitres) of sewage can be stored and held in the tunnels themselves while awaiting processing at sewage treatment plants, which release treated water into the Calumet and Des Plaines rivers.

Additional sewage is stored at the 7.9-billion-US-gallon (30-gigalitre) Thornton Composite Reservoir, and the 350-million-US-gallon (1,300-megalitre) Gloria Alitto Majewski Reservoir near O'Hare International Airport. The 3.5-billion-US-gallon (13 GL) McCook Reservoir was completed in 2017 and will be expanded to 10 billion US gallons (38 GL) by 2032. Upon completion, the TARP system will have a storage capacity of 17.5 billion US gallons (66 GL).

== Reservoirs ==
Name	Location	Coordinates	Maximum capacity (gallons)	Status	Notes
Gloria Alitto Majewski Reservoir	Elk Grove Village, IL	42°01′03″N 87°56′42″W	350,000,000 (1,320,000 m^{3})	Completed in 1998.	
McCook Reservoir	McCook, IL	41°46′22″N 87°50′24″W	3,500,000,000 (13,200,000 m^{3})	First phase completed in 2017.	Second phase will expand the reservoir's capacity to 10 billion gallons by 2032.
Thornton Composite Reservoir	Thornton, IL	41°34′55″N 87°37′05″W	7,900,000,000 (29,900,000 m^{3})	Completed in 2015.	Constructed with the closed north lobe sections of Thornton Quarry.

== Effects ==
Severe weather events have forced water management agencies to pump excess wastewater into the lake and river in order to prevent flooding. These incidents have decreased in frequency as more of the Deep Tunnel system has become operational. Long considered an open sewer, the Chicago River now hosts more than 60 fish species and increased wildlife along its shores. Substantial development is occurring along many portions of the riverfront. Canoeing is once again allowed on the waterway, and in 2025, the City of Chicago approved the first Chicago River open-water swim after a century of closure.

On October 3, 1986, a heavy thunderstorm drenched the southern portion of the Deep Tunnel area with several inches of rain in a short period of time. While the Deep Tunnel system performed satisfactorily by absorbing excess water, water within the system itself rushed past the north side of Chicago and near the Bahá'í Temple in Wilmette. Geysers of over 65 feet (20 m) were reported in both locations for up to an hour as the water was redistributed more evenly through the system. A 30 ft (9 m) geyser erupted downtown at the corner of Jefferson and Monroe, trapping a woman inside her car as it filled with water. A system of watertight bulkheads has since been installed to prevent the event from occurring again.

During the Chicago Flood of 1992, the water from the Chicago River that leaked into the long-disused underground freight tunnel system was eventually drained into the Deep Tunnel network, which itself was still under construction.

Operation of the tunnels reduced sewer overflow events from an average of 100 days per year to 50. Since Thornton Reservoir came online in 2015, combined sewer overflows in that reservoir's service area have been nearly eliminated. While the tunnel and reservoir system allows water to leave the sewer system quickly, it does not address the design capacity for water entering the sewers, which in many places is limited by the older sewer system itself to handle only two inches (51 mm) of rain in 24 hour period.

During heavy rainfall in July 2-4, 2026, the McCook Reservoir filled up to 98% and the Thornton Reservoir filled up to 94%, the highest the Thornton Reservoir has ever reached since coming online in 2015. Residents near the Thornton Reservoir complained about a strong odor of raw sewage from the full reservoir. The MWRD added large aerators to help mitigate the odor.

== Sources ==
- Horan, Deborah (March 14, 2005). "Deep Tunnel, Deep Ties". Chicago Tribune.
- "Featured Underground: TARP Torrence Avenue Tunnel". American Underground Construction Association. August 1999. Archived from the original on 2000-08-23.
- "Deep Tunnel Project". Village of South Holland. Archived from the original on 2013-09-19.
- Schmidt, Elaine (August 2004). "Chicago's Tunnel, Reservoir Plan". McGraw-Hill Construction. Archived from the original on 2011-07-17.
- "Tunnel and Reservoir Plan (TARP)". The Metropolitan Water Reclamation District of Greater Chicago.
- Jones, Steve; Waller, John (2006). Down the Drain Five: Deep Tunnel (Report). Chicago Public Library. Archived from the original on 2007-09-29.
