= Raising of Chicago =

1850s and 1860s engineering project in Chicago

During the 1850s and 1860s, engineers carried out a piecemeal raising of the grade of central Chicago to lift the city out of its low-lying swampy ground. Buildings and sidewalks were raised on jackscrews. The work was funded by both private property owners and public funds.

== Overview ==
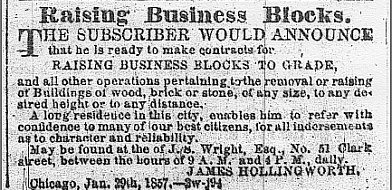
Advertisement in the Chicago Daily Tribune, 1858.

During the 19th century, the elevation of the Chicago area was only a little higher than the shoreline of Lake Michigan. For two decades following the city's incorporation, drainage from the city surface was inadequate, resulting in large bodies of standing and pathogenic water. These conditions caused numerous epidemics, including typhoid fever and dysentery, which blighted Chicago six years in a row, culminating in the 1854 outbreak of cholera that killed six percent of the city’s population.

The crisis forced the city's engineers and aldermen to take the drainage problem seriously, and after many heated discussions—and following at least one false start—a solution eventually materialized. In 1856, engineer Ellis S. Chesbrough drafted a plan for the installation of a citywide sewerage system and submitted it to the Common Council, which adopted the plan. Workers then laid drains, covered and refinished roads and sidewalks with several feet of soil, and raised most buildings on screwjacks to the new grade.

Many of the city's old wooden buildings were not considered worth raising, so instead the owners of these buildings had them either demolished or else placed on rollers and moved to the outskirts of the city. Business activities in such buildings continued, as they were being moved.

== Raisings of buildings ==
=== Earliest raising of a brick building ===
In January 1858, the first masonry building in Chicago to be thus raised—a four-story, 70-foot-long (21 m), 750-ton (680 metric tons) brick structure situated at the northeast corner of Randolph Street and Dearborn Street—was lifted on two hundred jackscrews to its new grade, which was 6 feet 2 inches (1.88 m) higher than the old one, “without the slightest injury to the building.” It was the first of more than 50 comparably large masonry buildings to be raised that year. The contractor was an engineer from Boston, James Brown, who went on to partner with Chicago engineer James Hollingsworth; Brown and Hollingsworth became the first and, it seems, the busiest building raising partnership in the city. By the year's end, they were lifting brick buildings more than 100 feet (30 m) long, and the following spring they took the contract to raise a brick block of more than twice that length.

=== The Row on Lake Street ===
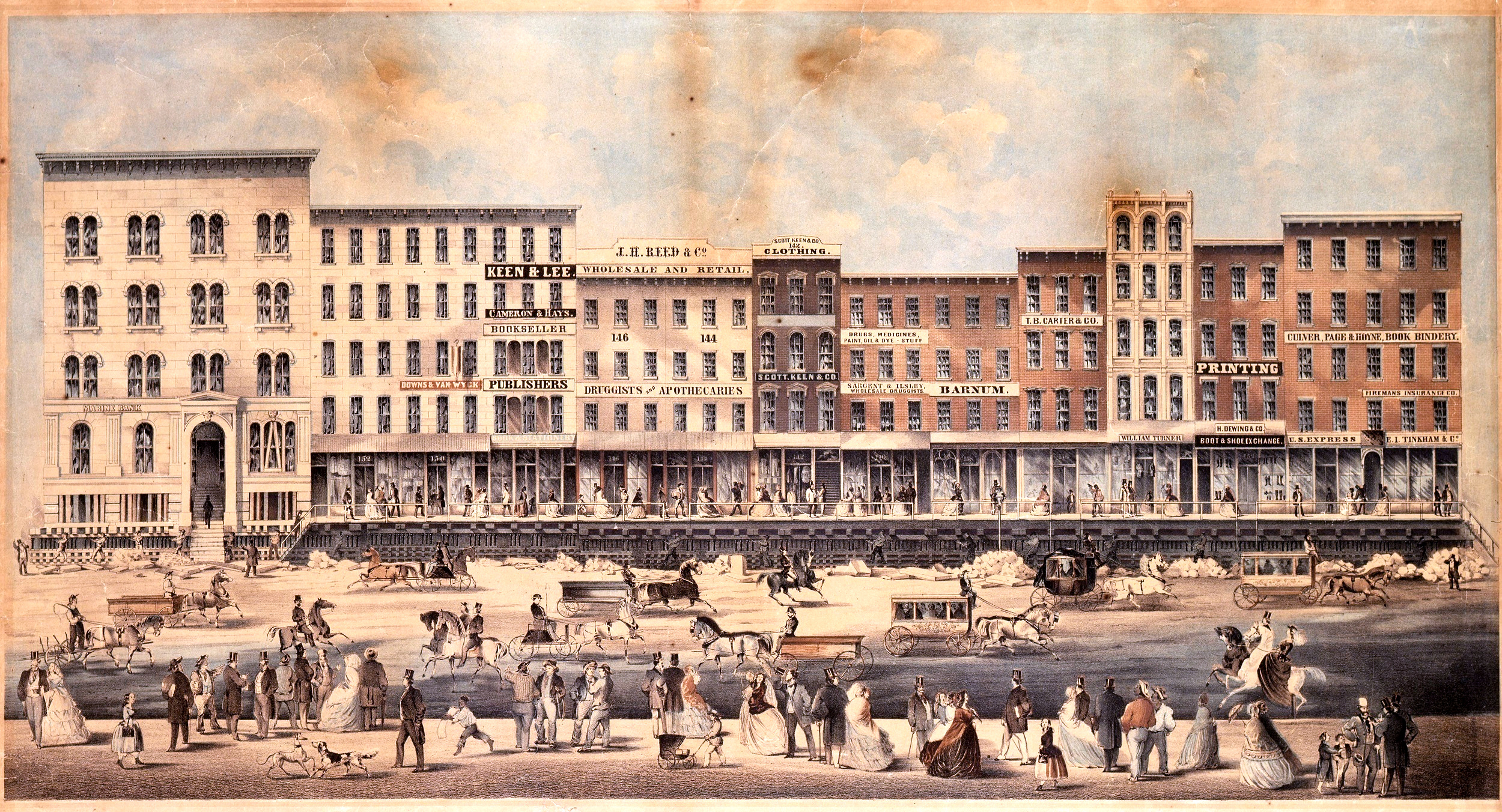
Raising a block of buildings on Lake Street

In 1860 a consortium of six engineers—including Brown, Hollingsworth and George Pullman—co-managed a project to raise half a city block on Lake Street, between Clark Street and LaSalle Street at once. This was a continuous masonry row of shops, offices, printeries, etc., 320 feet (98 m) long, comprising four-story and five-story brick and stone buildings. It had a footprint taking up almost one acre (4,000 m^{2}) of space, and an estimated total weight—including hanging sidewalks—of 35,000 short tons (32,000 t). Businesses operating in these premises were not closed down during the operation; as the buildings were being raised, people came, went, shopped and worked in them as they would ordinarily do. In five days the entire assembly was elevated 4 feet 8 inches (1.42 m), by a team consisting of 600 men using 6,000 jackscrews, which made it ready for new foundation walls to be built underneath. The spectacle drew crowds of thousands, who were, on the final day, permitted to walk at the old ground level among the jacks.

=== Tremont House ===
In 1861 a consortium of engineers Ely, Smith and Pullman led a team that raised the Tremont House hotel on the southeast corner of Lake Street and Dearborn Street. This six-story brick building was luxuriously appointed and had an area of over 1 acre (4,000 m^{2}). Once again business as usual was maintained as this large hotel ascended. Some of the guests staying there at the time—among whose number were several VIPs and a US Senator— were oblivious to the process as 500 men worked under covered trenches operating their 1,000 jackscrews. One patron was puzzled to note that the front steps leading from the street into the hotel were becoming steeper every day, and that when he checked out, the windows were several feet above his head, whereas before they had been at eye level. This hotel building, which until just the previous year had been the tallest building in Chicago, was raised 6 feet (1.8 m) without incident.

=== Robbins Building ===
On the corner of South Water Street and Wells Street stood the Robbins Building, an iron building 150 feet (46 m) long, 80 feet (24 m) wide and five stories high. This was a very heavy building; its ornate iron frame, its 12-inch (300 mm) thick masonry wall filling, and its “floors filled with heavy goods” made for a weight estimated at 27,000 tons (24,000 metric tons), a large load to raise over a relatively small area. Hollingsworth and Coughlin took the contract and in November 1865 lifted not only the building but also the 230 feet (70 m) of stone sidewalk outside it. A total of 1,584 jackscrews were used over a three-day period. The complete mass of iron and masonry was raised 27.5 inches (0.70 m), “without the slightest crack or damage.”

=== Hydraulic raising of the Franklin House ===
In 1860 the Franklin House, a four story brick building on Franklin Street, was raised with hydraulic apparatus by engineer John C. Lane, of the Lane and Stratton partnership of San Francisco. Californian engineers had been using hydraulic jacks to raise brick buildings in and around San Francisco as early as 1853.

== Relocated buildings ==
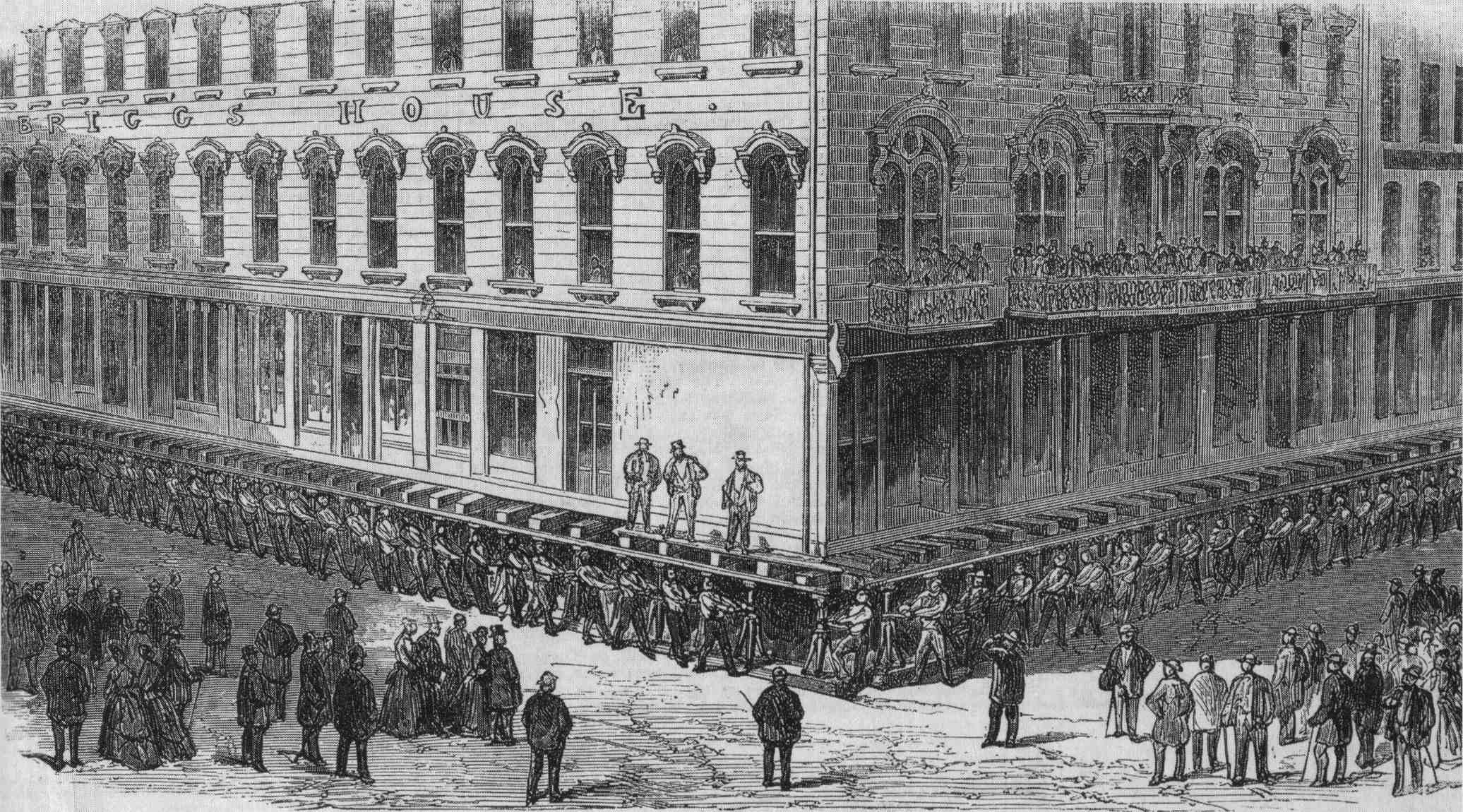
Raising the Briggs House, a brick hotel, in 1866.

Many of central Chicago’s hurriedly-erected wooden frame buildings were considered inappropriate to the burgeoning and increasingly wealthy city. Rather than raise them several feet, proprietors often preferred to relocate these old frame buildings, replacing them with masonry blocks built to the latest grade. Consequently, the practice of putting the old multi-story, intact and furnished wooden buildings—sometimes entire rows of them en bloc—on rollers and moving them to the outskirts of town or to the suburbs was so common as to be considered nothing more than routine traffic.

Contemporary traveler David Macrae writes, “Never a day passed during my stay in the city that I did not meet one or more houses shifting their quarters. One day I met nine. Going out Great Madison Street in the horse-cars we had to stop twice to let houses get across.” The function for which such a building had been constructed would often be maintained during the move, with people dining, shopping and working in these buildings as they were rolled down the street. Brick buildings also were moved from one location to another, and in 1866, the first of these—a brick building of two and a half stories—made the short move from Madison Street out to Monroe Street. Later, many other much larger brick buildings were rolled much greater distances across Chicago.

== See also ==
- Wacker Drive
- Regrading in Seattle
- Seattle Underground
- Underground Atlanta
