= History of public health in Chicago =

The history of public health in Chicago is characterized by multiple interacting political, economic, social and medical trends of the last two centuries.

Bad sanitation for polluted water caused much of the disease and death in the 19th century. Many Chicagoans distrusted hospitals and relied on folk remedies. Finally large-scale projects cleaned up the streets and neighborhoods, and health providers realized they needed to keep washing their hands. A strong network of hospitals emerged with broad support. As late as 1900, the leading causes of death were tuberculosis, pneumonia, chronic diarrhea of infancy, and gastroenteritis—largely the afflictions of infants, children, and in the case of tuberculosis, young adults. The population had grown largely by the immigration of young people from Europe, which continued until 1914, when the world war ended civilian travel. After 1914, the population largely stabilized and grew older. Medical cures and vaccines were increasingly found for children to cure or prevent contagious diseases, but it was much more difficult to deal with the heart conditions and cancer that killed older Chicagoans.

== Epidemics ==
An outbreak of cholera in 1849 killed 678 persons, 2.9 percent of the city's population, and an 1854 outbreak killed 1,424 people. Another cholera epidemic hit the city in 1866 and 1867. In the late 19th century, typhoid fever mortality rate in Chicago averaged 65 per 100,000 people a year. The worst year was 1891, when a long outbreak of typhoid killed around 2,000 and threatened the 1893 Columbian Exposition; the typhoid death rate was 174 per 100,000 persons.

Chicago faced various epidemics beyond waterborne diseases. Smallpox, diphtheria, and whooping cough were significant threats in the 1830s to 1890s. The city was hard hit by the worldwide 1918 Spanish flu pandemic, with about 20,000 deaths.

COVID-19 closed down schools and offices and most gathering places in 2020–2021. About 7,400 Chicagoans died, especially victims over age 80 .

The Chicago 1885 cholera epidemic myth is a persistent urban legend, stating that 90,000 people in Chicago died of typhoid fever and cholera in 1885. Although the story was widely rumored, there was no such event and these deaths did not occur.

=== Summer heat waves ===
The arrival of air conditioning after 1960 made intense hot summers tolerable in middle-class neighborhoods, but poor districts still suffered from the intense heat and high humidity.. An extreme case was the 1995 Chicago heat wave when the temperature reached 106 °F (41 °C) at Midway Airport, with a heat index of 119 °F (48.3 °C), an all-time peak. Over 700 people died, especially, the elderly. Researchers discovered: "a higher risk of deaths among people who lived alone, on the top floor of a building, in apartment houses, in single room occupancy dwellings, in homes with a small number of rooms, who had less access to public transportation, and who were socially isolated."

Historical population
Census	Pop.	Note	%±
1840	4,470		—
1850	29,963		570.3%
1860	112,172		274.4%
1870	298,977		166.5%
1880	503,185		68.3%
1890	1,099,850		118.6%
1900	1,698,575		54.4%
1910	2,185,283		28.7%
1920	2,701,705		23.6%
1930	3,376,438		25.0%
1940	3,396,808		0.6%
1950	3,620,962		6.6%
1960	3,550,404		−1.9%
1970	3,366,957		−5.2%
1980	3,005,072		−10.7%
1990	2,783,726		−7.4%
2000	2,896,016		4.0%
2010	2,695,598		−6.9%
2020	2,746,388		1.9%

== Waterborne disease control ==
Chicago's early public health efforts focused on combating the greatest threats to public health: waterborne diseases, particularly cholera and typhoid. Starting with a cholera outbreak in 1832, for the rest of the century, Chicago struggled with repeated waves of bacterial diseases. Medical experts in Britain had demonstrated that bad sanitation in overcrowded neighborhoods without adequate sewers caused disease. In 1834, the city dug its first drainage ditch down State Street. The sewers emptied into the Chicago River, which in turn emptied into Lake Michigan. Streets and buildings were raised 8–10 feet above ground level to improve drainage. Chicago's drinking water came from the Lake—the sewers could not empty there. The solution was to reverse the Chicago River's flow in 1900 through the construction of the Sanitary and Ship Canal. The dirty water now went south and (hopefully) would be clean by the time it reached the state line. It was a landmark achievement, diverting wastewater away from Lake Michigan. The city also built an extensive sewage treatment system so that what was dumped into the river was not so bad. Major treatment works were constructed in the 1920s and 1930s. The Tunnel and Reservoir Plan (TARP) currently underway, was adopted in 1972 to manage combined sewer overflows and reduce flooding.

== Establishment of health departments ==
Chicago's health governance evolved over time. The city's 1837 charter included a Board of Health and a health officer. In 1867, health functions were established under an actual department of health. The Department of Health was reorganized in 1876, creating the position of Commissioner of Health. Milk inspection began in 1892. Water sterilization was implemented in 1912, dramatically reducing typhoid rates. The Chicago Municipal Tuberculosis Sanitarium opened in 1915. Public health officials tried repeatedly to clean up the unsanitary slaughterhouses, but business resisted until the federal government finally imposed Pure food laws in 1906.

The most prominent leader of public health was Dr. Herman Bundesen the city's health commissioner from 1922 to 1928 and 1931 to 1960. He proved an able, if eccentric, administrator. He was eager for publicity and claimed credit for the city's reduction of infant mortality, improvement of milk sanitation, and the curtailment of diphtheria and smallpox. He tried to reduce venereal disease and promoted birth control. He identified and eradicated an outbreak of amoebiasis during the 1933 Chicago World's Fair. Polio eradication was a high priority, and he made Chicago one of the earliest U.S. cities to introduce the Salk vaccine in 1955. He was the unsuccessful Democratic candidate for governor in 1936, making public health a major campaign issue.

== Hospitals ==
The history of hospitals in Chicago is rich with innovation, diversity, and rapid growth, reflecting the city's development as a major medical center. Before the emergence of modern hospitals, Chicago relied on a neighborhood based dispensary system to provide medical help for poor people without charge.

=== Rapid Expansion and Specialization ===
Before the 1870s, hospitals had a bad reputation. Poor people went there to die, even those who were not fatally ill when they arrived. Bad sanitation on the part of doctors spread disease inside the hospital. Finally.the discovery of the germ theory of disease produced an immediate transition to concerns with sanitation. and cleanliness. After the Great Fire of 1871, Chicago's hospital system grew rapidly in response to the city's burgeoning population. The city's first hospital was built in 1843 in response to epidemic fears. Vaccination programs for the poor began in 1848. Specialized facilities were created for specific health crises, such as smallpox and cholera. The expansion was characterized by steady increases of bed capacity to meet growing demand; specialization to serve specific communities and medical needs; and the development of new facilities and technologies.

In 1927 and 1928—years of peak prosperity—numerous hospitals expanded or were newly built, including Mercy Hospital (now part of Insight Hospital and Medical Center), Passavant Memorial Hospital (now part of Northwestern Memorial Hospital), and Edgewater Hospital. In 1916 the University of Chicago obtained funding for. an independent academic medical school effort with a teaching hospital. The facility opened in 1927 and is now the Pritzker School of Medicine.

=== Community-focused Care ===
Many hospitals in Chicago were established to serve specific ethnic, religious, or cultural communities:

Over twenty Catholic hospitals were built, including Mercy Hospital, St. Elizabeth's Hospital, and St. Anne's Hospital. The main Jewish hospitals were Michael Reese Hospital and Mount Sinai Medical Center. German Hospital (renamed Grant Hospital in World War I) was built by the German Protestant population. Provident Hospital (Chicago) was founded in 1891 to train Black nurses, who were not welcome in other hospitals but were needed by the rapidly growing African-American community.

This approach ensured that diverse populations could receive care in environments that respected their cultural and linguistic needs. One major result was that the specific communities patronized "their" hospitals and generated political support.

=== Medical Innovation and professional education ===
Chicago became a hub for medical advancement and education: The world's first successful open-heart surgery was performed at Provident Hospital in 1893. Cook County Hospital became a major training center, with one in four American physicians receiving training there at one point. The University of Chicago established a medical campus in Hyde Park, expanding clinical departments and building specialized hospitals

=== Transition to Modern Healthcare ===
The late 20th century saw significant changes in hospital operations and funding, By 1950, Chicago had 84 hospitals serving a population of 3.6 million. They increasingly focused on attracting paying patients with improved amenities and services. Since 1965 Medicare and Medicaid and other federal programs dramatically expanded spending on health nationwide. As the stockyards closed and old manufacturing industries faded away, health spending increasingly dominated the Chicago economy.

=== Healthy Chicago ===
On August 16, 2011, Mayor Rahm Emanuel and Commissioner Bechara Choucair, M.D. unveiled the Healthy Chicago public health agenda with the Chicago Department of Public Health. Healthy Chicago identifies 16 health outcome targets and 12 key priority areas and over 200 supporting strategies including:

- Tobacco Use
- Obesity Prevention
- HIV Prevention
- Adolescent Health
- Cancer Disparities
- Heart Disease & Stroke
- Access to Care
- Healthy Mothers & Babies
- Communicable Disease Control & Prevention
- Healthy Homes
- Violence Prevention
- Public Health Infrastructure

== See also ==
- Chicago 1885 cholera epidemic myth, it never happened
- Chicago Area Water Quality
- Chicago Department of Public Health
  - Chicago Board of Health
  - Herman Bundesen, health commissioner 1922–1960
- Demographics of Chicago
- History of Chicago
- History of public health in the United States
