= July 2023 Chicago area flood =

Natural disaster in Chicago, Illinois, United States

The July 2023 Chicago Area Flood was caused by a heavy rainfall that occurred on July 2, 2023, in the Chicago Metropolitan Area of northeastern Illinois. Rainfall up to 9.0 inches (23 cm) occurred over an 18-hour period; the majority occurred from early in the morning to late in the afternoon. Flood-related damages across northeastern Illinois were estimated to be at least $500 million (equivalent to $513 million in 2024) in the Chicago area, making it among the most expensive weather-related events in the history of Chicago and Cook County. This event was part of a cluster of three extreme rainfall events which occurred in the central portion of the metropolitan area within an approximately one-year period from September 2022 to September 2023. The flood event occurred on the same day as the NASCAR Grant Park 220 on the Chicago Street Course.

== Background ==
Prior to July 2023, multiple extreme rainfall events occurred in Chicago or the nearby suburbs of central Cook County at a frequency of about one to two times per decade. Notable events include flood-producing rainfall in October 1954, July 1957, June 1967, June 1976, August 1987, July 1996, August 2001, September 2008, July 2010, July 2011, and September 2022. Primary flood impacts in the Chicago metropolitan area include urban flooding of roadways, underpasses, and basements. During more significant rainfall events, basements may be flooded due to combined sewer backups.

== July 2023 event ==
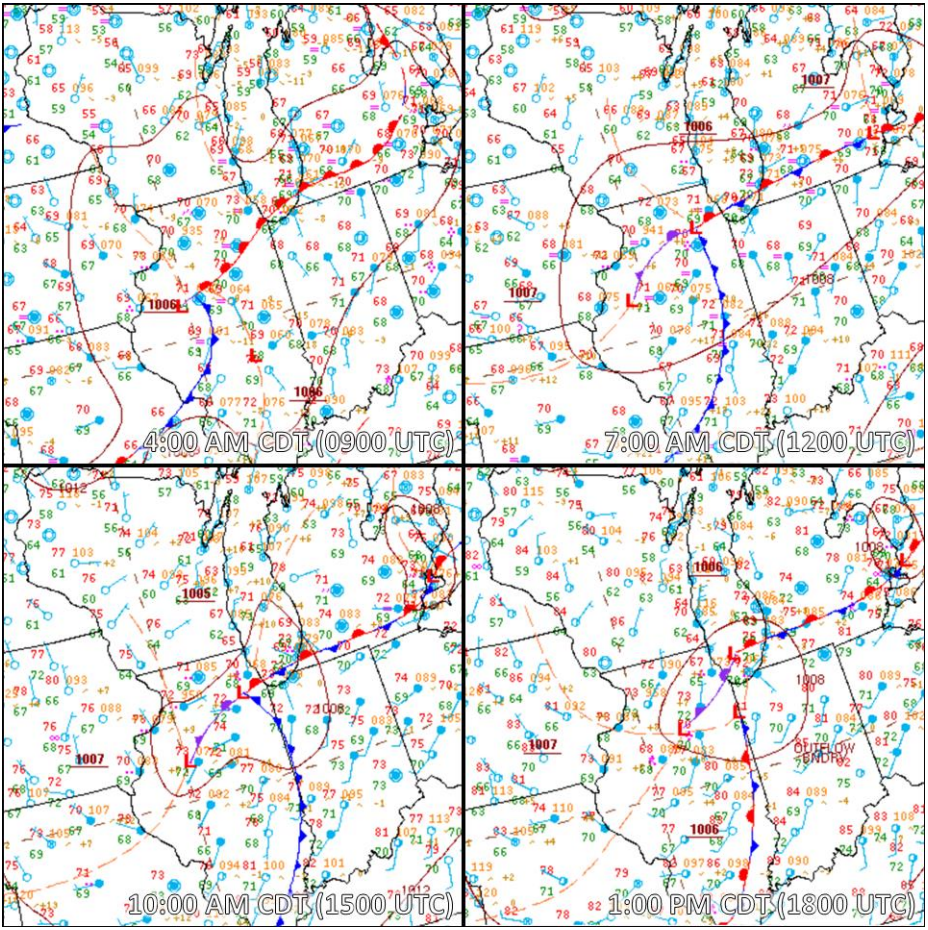
Surface weather features in northeastern Illinois on July 2, 2023. Maps are valid 3 hours apart and begin at 4:00 AM CDT.

During the overnight and early morning hours of July 2, a nearly stationary, weak warm front extended across parts of northern Illinois from roughly Peoria east-northeast toward the southern Chicago metropolitan area. A weak area of surface low pressure, a remnant mesoscale convective vortex, was located in west-central Illinois, drifting slowly to the northeast. As the area of low pressure neared the Chicago area, showers and thunderstorms developed and continued throughout the day.

=== Rainfall ===
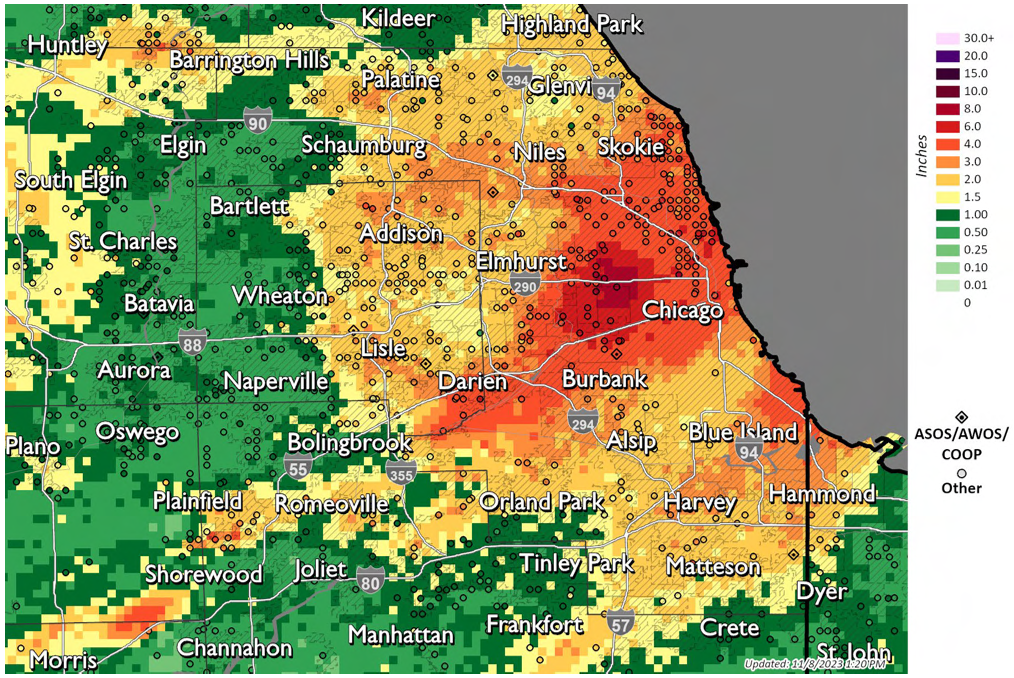
Rainfall in the Chicago Metropolitan Area of northeastern Illinois on July 2, 2023.

Showers and thunderstorms first began to form in the Chicago area to the east of an area of low pressure between 5:00 AM and 7:00 AM. Between 7:00 AM and 8:00 AM, a line of heavy rainfall had drifted southward into central Cook County, and was centered near Chicago and the immediate western suburbs. Over the next four hours, this band of heavy rainfall remained nearly stationary. The band of rainfall dissipated and brief break in heavy rainfall began around 12:00 PM, while a new band of rainfall formed to the north of Chicago along the shore of Lake Michigan. By 2:00 PM, this second band of heavy rainfall had drifted slowly southward to near Chicago. Over the next three hours, this band of heavy rainfall remained nearly stationary, again impacting some of the same areas as earlier in the morning. The second band of rainfall dissipated around 5:00 PM. In total, widespread rainfall of 2.0 to 9.0 inches (5.1 to 22.9 cm) occurred across the central portion of the Chicago metropolitan area over an 18-hour period, with peak rainfall occurring near the western border of Chicago near Berwyn and Cicero.

=== Flooding ===
Widespread flooding of structures and roadways, some significant, occurred across Chicago and the immediate western suburbs, including the Berwyn, Oak Park, and Cicero areas. Flooding caused at least $500 million (equivalent to $513 million in 2024) in damages in the Chicago area, making it one of the most costly weather events in Chicago history. Flash flooding impacted numerous roadways and underpasses, including multiple Interstate Highways. At least 70,000 basements were flooded. Rainfall exceeded the capacity of the deep tunnels and McCook Reservoir, and the resulting combined sewer overflow caused the Chicago River to rise above flood stage in and near the Chicago Loop. The Chicago Harbor Lock was opened to reduce the effects of flooding.

NASCAR racing on the Chicago Street Course was scheduled to continue with the Grant Park 220 after the Loop 121 the day prior. Heavy rainfall caused a delayed start to the race.

=== Aftermath ===
Floodwaters from the Chicago River entered Lake Michigan after the Chicago Harbor Lock was opened to "reverse" the river (back to the original flow direction), sending untreated sewage mixed with rain water into the lake. Due to the large number of structures impacted by flooding, the event was declared an Illinois state disaster area on July 11. After a request by the state of Illinois, the event was declared a federal disaster on August 15, which allowed FEMA to offer individual assistance grants to those affected by flooding.
