= Water crib =

Offshore structure supplying water to pumping stations

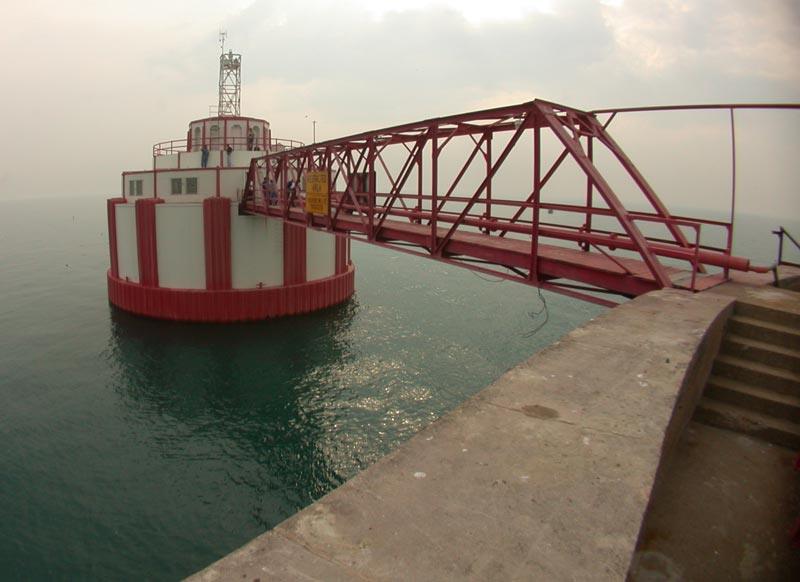
William E. Dever Crib in Chicago, IL

Water cribs are offshore structures that collect water from close to the bottom of a lake to supply a pumping station onshore. The name crib is derived from the function of the structure—to surround and protect the intake shaft. Cities supplied with drinking water collected by water cribs include Chicago, where two of the nine originally built cribs are in active use. Water cribs were also used as residences for caretakers who would live in the structure year round. Jobs included clearing debris and maintaining valves, gears, and instruments to keep the water flowing. These jobs have since been automated with periodic maintenance leaving no need for a full-time caretaker.

== Major cities with water cribs ==
| City | Active cribs (Note: This table shows above-water cribs only.) | Source |
|---|---|---|
| Buffalo | 1 | Lake Erie |
| Chicago | 2 | Lake Michigan |
| Cleveland | 1 (Note: Three of Cleveland's active cribs are submerged in Lake Erie.) | Lake Erie |
| Toledo | 1 | Lake Erie |

== See also ==
- Lighthouse
- Crib lighthouse
