= Chicago Rising from the Lake =

Bronze sculpture by Milton Horn in Chicago, Illinois, U.S.

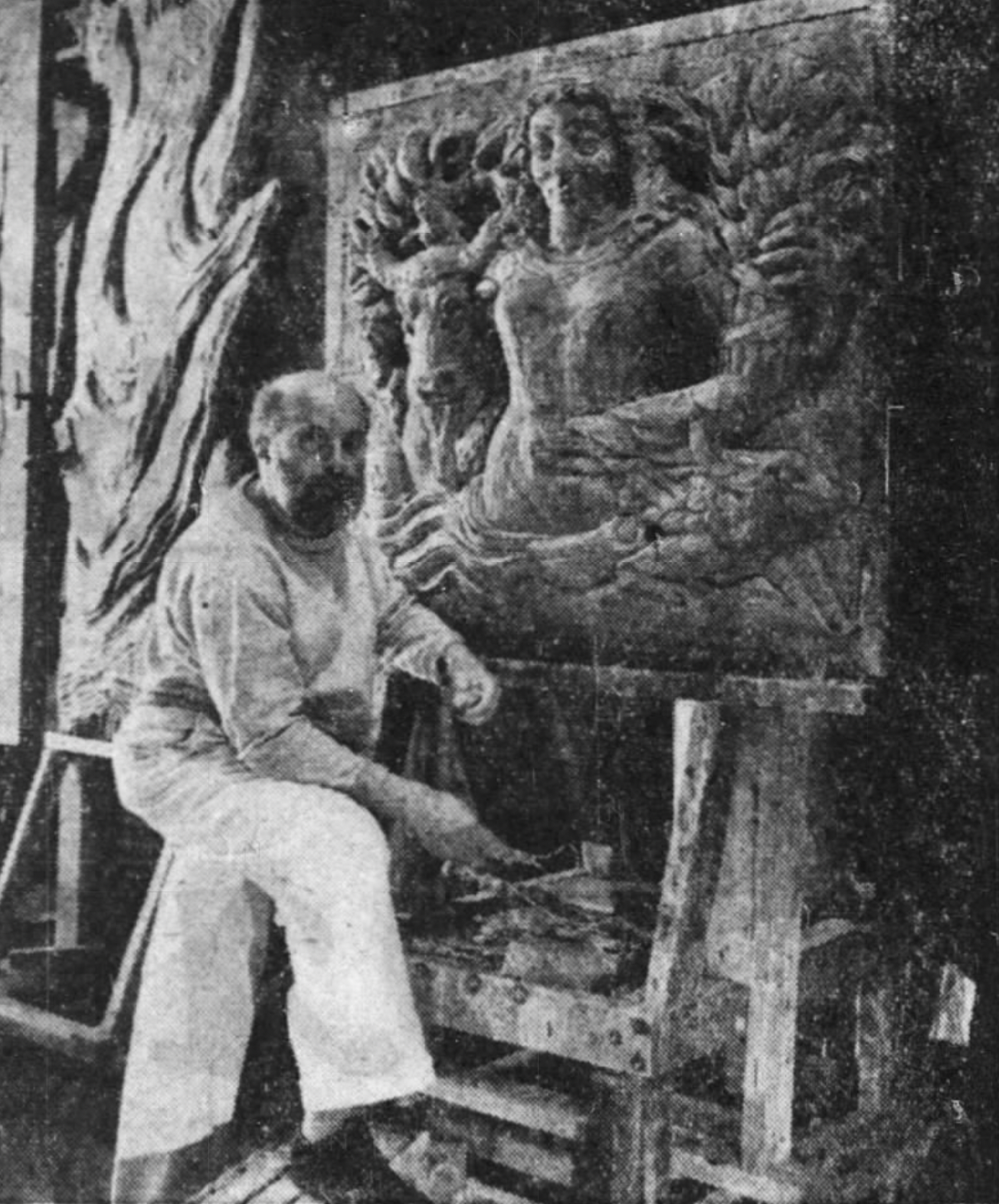
- 1954 photo of Milton Horn with a quarter scale model of his Chicago Rising from the Lake

- Location within Chicago metropolitan area
- Artist: Milton Horn
- Year: 1954
- Medium: Bronze
- Subject: Rebirth and leadership
- Dimensions: (7 ft (2.1 m) in × 12 ft (3.7 m) in)
- Weight: 3.5 tons
- Condition: Restored
- Location: Chicago, Illinois; 41°53′21″N 87°37′14″W
- Owner: City of Chicago

Chicago Rising from the Lake (1954) is a bronze sculpture by Milton Horn. The sculpture shows a woman, rising from waters of Lake Michigan, with flames, animals and wheat. It represents Chicago's rebirth after the Great Chicago Fire, and subsequent rise to become a leader in transportation, stockyards and commodities.

== History ==
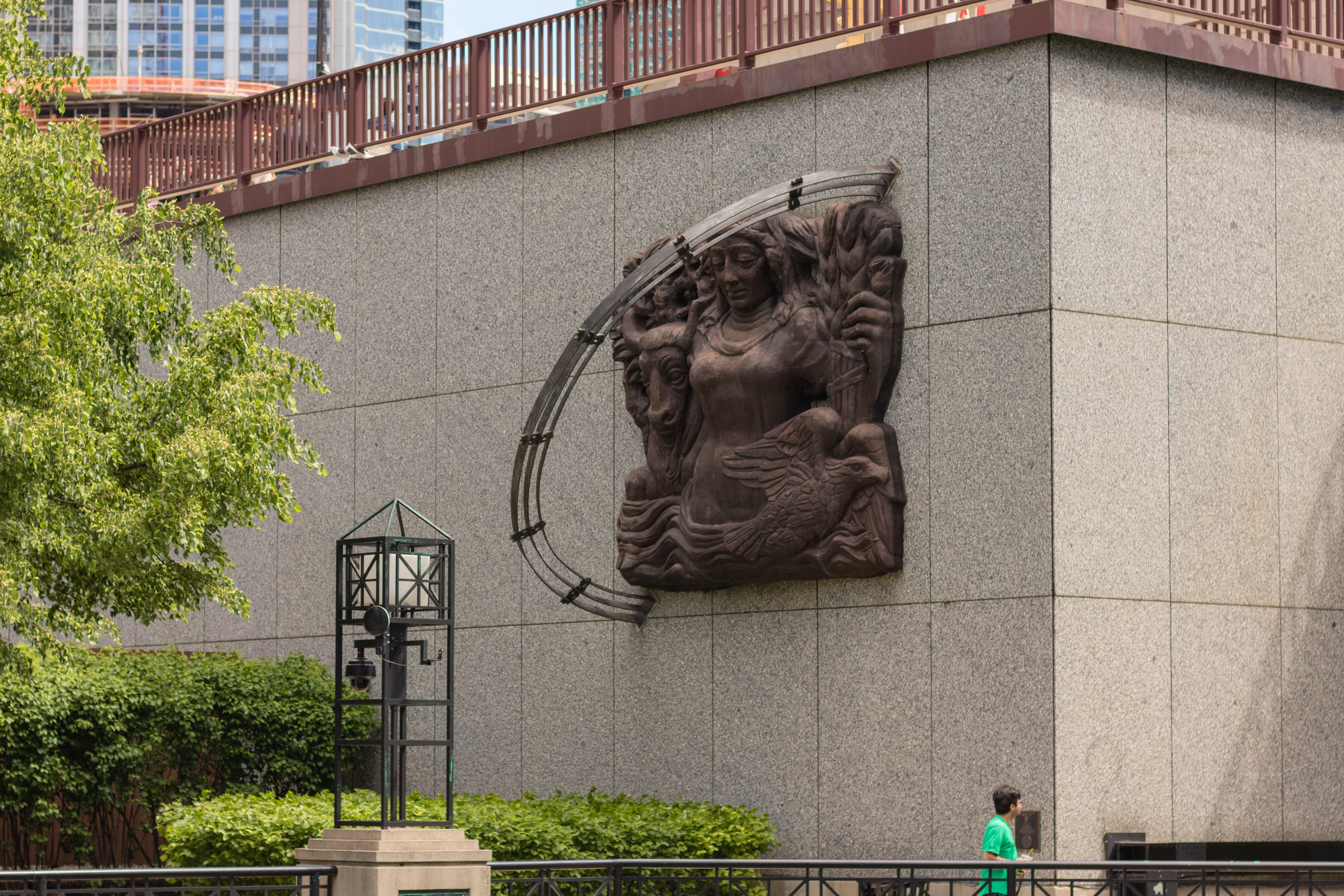
The sculpture in 2017

In 1953 the Chicago Department of Public Works awarded Milton Horn a US$5,000 commission to create the sculpture. It was the first sculpture purchased by the city of Chicago since 1892. Horn began by constructing a quarter-sized model of the sculpture in his studio. He completed the main sculpture in 1954 and it was installed in a parking garage in 1955. In 1983 the statue was removed when the garage was razed. After removal it was intended to be installed at Chicago's Civic Opera House, but funds could not be raised. The sculpture was then lost until 1987: it was eventually found in an empty swimming pool at that time, and moved. The bronze sculpture was lost again until a Chicago firefighter found it lying in a makeshift dump in 1997.

The city decided to restore the piece and in 1998 it was placed on the Chicago Riverwalk, affixed to a wall beneath the northwest corner of the Columbus Drive bridge. The city paid $60,000 to restore the sculpture but three bronze bars were missing when the sculpture was installed in 1998. A private donor paid to have the bars recast and added to the sculpture in 2004.

== Design ==
It is a 7 ft (2.1 m) x 12 ft (3.7 m) sculpture and it weighs 3.5 tons. The sculpture is a depiction of a woman holding grain in her hand while she embraces a bull. There is also an eagle in the piece. The design of the sculpture represents the city of Chicago's dominance of commodities markets in the mid-1950s. The design elements also show the rebirth of Chicago as a leader in transportation, and it was a depiction of the Chicago Stockyards.

The woman in the sculpture is standing hip deep in the water of Lake Michigan with carved flames representing the Great Chicago Fire. She is rising from both the lake and from the fire that once destroyed Chicago. The sculpture also has three-dimensional bronze bars which represent the railroad. The bars run diagonally across the center of the piece representing Chicago's location in the middle of the United States.
