= Carlton D. Wall House =

Historic house in Michigan, United States

- Carlton D. Wall House ("Snowflake")
- U.S. National Register of Historic Places
- Location within Michigan Location within the United States
- Interactive map
- Location: 12305 Beck Rd., Plymouth, Michigan
- Coordinates: 42°22′16″N 83°30′42″W
- Area: 5 acres (2.0 ha)
- Built: 1941
- Architect: Frank Lloyd Wright
- Architectural style: Usonian
- NRHP reference No.: 94000620
- Added to NRHP: June 28, 1994

The Carlton D. Wall House, also known as Snowflake, is a Frank Lloyd Wright designed home in Plymouth Township, Michigan. It is one of Wright's more elaborate Usonian homes. In 1941, recently married Mr. and Mrs. Carlton David Wall, who were Wright's youngest clients, approached Wright to design a house for them after Carlton Wall studied Wright's architecture in college.

Its form comprises a series of hexagons radiating from a central chimney or service core without any true right angles, with wings for a nursery, terrace, guest room and carport. The cypress and brick house came to be known as Snowflake because of the hexagonal patterns created by the diamond grid design. This was the first use of Wright's modular diamond structure in Michigan, a technique he used elsewhere when incorporating a house into a hillside.

A massive brick retaining wall supports a dramatic terrace. Floor to ceiling windows, doors without mullions, and corner windows are used throughout the house. This brings the "outside in", which is the case in all Wright houses. From 1943 to 1944, Milton Horn collaborated with Wright on a wood relief mural for the house. In 1947, a 1,000-square-foot (93 m^{2}) bedroom wing was added to accommodate the Walls' growing family. It is located to the west of the original house.

Snowflake was purchased by Tom Monaghan, the founder of Domino's Pizza, in 1983. It was used on a rotating basis by executives of his corporation. It was to be part of Monaghan's Frank Lloyd Wright Study Center. In the late 1980s it was sold to the current owners who use it as a residence.

== See also ==
- List of Frank Lloyd Wright works
