= Chicago 1885 cholera epidemic myth =

Urban legend

The Chicago 1885 cholera epidemic myth is a persistent urban legend, stating that 90,000 people in Chicago died of typhoid fever and cholera in 1885. Although the story is widely reported, these deaths did not occur.

== Fears of water pollution in Lake Michigan ==
Lake Michigan was the source of Chicago's drinking water. During a tremendous storm in 1885, the rainfall washed refuse from the Chicago River far out into the lake. Citizens feared that sewage run-off from the storm would reach the intake cribs of the Chicago lake tunnels (built in 1866 and 1874) and pollute the city’s drinking water.

== Slight rise in typhoid deaths ==
According to the legend, typhoid, cholera and other waterborne diseases from the contaminated drinking water killed up to 90,000 people. The Chicago Sanitary District (now The Metropolitan Water Reclamation District) was said to have been created by the Illinois legislature in 1889 in response to a terrible epidemic which killed thousands of residents of this fledgling city.

However, analysis of the deaths in Chicago shows no deaths from cholera and only a slight rise in typhoid deaths. In fact, no cholera outbreaks had occurred in Chicago since the 1860s. Typhoid deaths never exceeded 1,000 in any year in the 1880s. The supposed 90,000 deaths would have represented 12% of the city's population and would have left numerous public records as well as newspaper accounts. Libby Hill, researching her book The Chicago River: A Natural and Unnatural History, found no newspaper or mortality records and, at her prompting, the Chicago Tribune issued a retraction (on September 29, 2005) of the three recent instances where they had mentioned the epidemic.

== Actual deaths ==
An outbreak of cholera in 1849 killed 678 persons, 2.9 percent of the city's population, and an 1854 outbreak killed 1,424 people. Another cholera epidemic hit the city in 1866 and 1867. In the late 19th century, typhoid fever mortality rate in Chicago averaged 65 per 100,000 people per year. The worst year was 1891, when the typhoid death rate was 174 per 100,000 persons.

== See also ==
- History of public health in Chicago
