= Chicago area water quality =

Ever since Chicago was incorporated as a city in 1837, it has faced multiple issues concerning water quality to accommodate its growing size, driven by the city's ideal geography and accessibility to one of the largest bodies of fresh water, the Great Lakes. The City of Chicago has implemented multiple proposals and plans such as the Master Drainage Plan and Tunnel and Reservoir Plan to combat the increasing water quality issue and move in a more environmentally friendly direction. These plans will construct spillways to temporarily store overfilling sewage or stormwater and clean it before releasing it. However, it wasn't until 2015 that Chicago began to treat sewage and stormwater runoff, thus finally shedding its title as the last major city not to treat its sewage before being discharged into its waterways.

== Master Drainage Plan ==
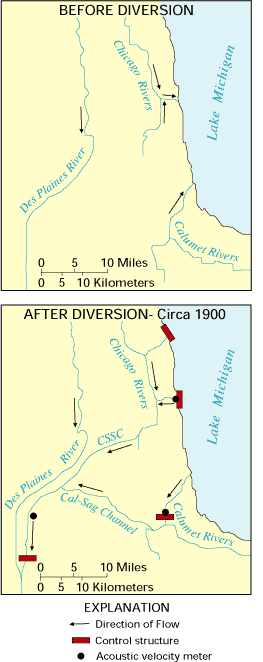
Switching the Chicago River's water flow

According to Macaitis (1985), the initial main concern around water quality stemmed from the constant drainage of sewage into the Chicago River and ultimately into Lake Michigan. The village lacked a sophisticated form of drainage instead of relying almost solely on roadside ditches. Burrill (1904) goes more in-depth stating that, Chicago inhabitants eventually took precautions to gather and utilize water from Lake Michigan through water intake valves that open up and ingest water from 4 miles away in 1840. However, the contaminants were still able to reach the water supply. The State of Illinois created a drainage commission for the Chicago area in 1852 to deal with a potentially contaminated city water supply. The commission made the master drainage plan in 1856. The master drainage plan was centered around raising the city by 3m and constructing new sewers that drained into the river and not the lake. However, once indoor plumbing was introduced to the world, the original sewer design, which was only designed to drain stormwater runoff, took on dual responsibility. It handled stormwater, its original function, and the sewage created from indoor plumbing. A combined sewage system can cause severe water pollution. When wet weather occurs and runoff exceeds the system's maximum flow rate, the excess runoff that the system can't handle is discharged directly into a nearby body of water, whether it be a lake or a river.

According to Rauch (1885) and Burrill (1904), four years after implementing the master drainage plan, the sewage commissioners called for the deepening and overall enlargement of the Illinois and Michigan Canal. They declared it as a "measure indispensable to the protection and health of the city." The Canal was initially created in 1848 with purely commercial reasoning to function as a lock and pumping works for boats when the water was too low. Due to the ever-expanding population and industrialization of Chicago, sewage and waste from domestic residents, slaughterhouses, and other sources continued to increase in volume and pour into the river.

In 1863 an epidemic of Erysipelas broke out among the river. This epidemic was a direct consequence of the filth and pollution of the water. The epidemic of Erysipelas coupled with the outcry and call for a better canal by the sewage commissioners resulted in modifying the Illinois and Michigan canal in 1865. The modification of the system changed the Canal's function to utilize the pumps to cleanse the river. According to Macaitis, it specifically took water pumped in from the Chicago River and discharged it back onto a high point in the Canal to ease and reduce the water pollution of Lake Michigan, the main supply of water.

However, the Canal was an inadequate solution to combat the growing problems to come. In 1885 an epidemic of waterborne disease arose and flourished due to the coupling of the ever-increasing volume of waste as well as the sedimentation that occurred in the Illinois and Michigan canal in 1879, which reduced the original slow current to an even more reduced flow capacity. To directly combat the continuously increased volumes of polluted and contaminated water, the city of Chicago created the Chicago Sanitary District, which was constructed to develop and maintain a canal system that reverses the flow of the Chicago River and the Calumet River systems.

In 1900 the main channel of the plan was finished and provided relief as a new process for sewage and runoff. Switching the water flow in the river allowed the discharged sewage of the city population to flow in the opposite direction. Instead of allowing the Chicago River to drain the city's sewage into Lake Michigan directly, the reversal of the channel allows for Lake Michigan to flow into the Chicago River. This reversal was done to eliminate the contamination of the city's drinking supply. Not only that but also for the fact that it helps make the river cleaner since reversing the channel allows for Lake Michigan's water flow to assist in the process of diluting and cleaning the sewage that's discharged into the river. The entire canal system wasn't completed until 1922, but it was deemed that "The canal system dramatically altered Chicago's natural drainage pattern for the better." This canal system replaced the earlier constructed Illinois and Michigan Canal, which by then had become unusable.

== Tunnel and Reservoir Plan ==
Combined Sewer System

The change in the river's water flow was estimated to provide enough treatment-by-dilution for up to a population of three million. However, in 1908, it became clear to the Chicago Sanitary District that the city’s population was continuing to grow and that the population would soon exceed the treatment capacity that the canal offered. Although they recognized this fact, it was not until 1920 that the construction of the district's first sewage treatment plant began. The treatment plant and its interceptors were designed to treat sanitary and industrial waste, but only in dry weather conditions. This is an issue because once data was collected to analyze the exact volume of runoff and sewage discharged, it was found that, with Chicago’s annual rainfall of 84 cm, a mixture of runoff and sewage is discharged into the river about 100x’s a year. It was not until after the 1930s that combined sewer systems were replaced and banned for their better alternative, the separate sewer system. A separate sewer system encompasses two main lines to treat separately. One of the lines only treats runoff water, while the other is a separate sanitary system line designed to handle and only treat sewage. Heavy rainfall causes flooding through sewage backups and extremely heavy rainfall, or “heavy heavy” rainfall, causes the waterways to back up with sewage and back flow into Lake Michigan. The issue of water quality remained relatively untouched after that, until 1967.

In 1967 a committee of experts was formed, who represented state and local interests, to study the area’s pollution and flooding problems. Although, it was not until 1969 and having considered over 50 other alternative plans that the committee reached an agreement to form the Tunnel and Reservoir Plan (TARP) as the solution to the area's combined sewage issue. According to the Metropolitan Water Reclamation District (2019), TARP, also referred to as the “deep tunnel” plan, was designed to be a system of deep, large-diameter tunnels and vast reservoirs that would work so as to reduce the flooding, improve the water quality in Chicago area waterways, and protect Lake Michigan from the pollution caused by sewage discharge and/or runoff.

TARP functions so that when it rains, the large system of tunnels captures and stores the combined runoff of storm water and sewage that otherwise would be discharged into the Chicago area waterways. The stored water that TARP captures is then pumped into reclamation plants and cleaned before it is released back into the waterways. TARP has been recognized for its success and achievements towards “dramatically” improving the water quality of the Chicago River, Calumet River, and other waterways.

Although the plan was a success, it is still incomplete. According to Macaitis, In 1975, the Clean Water Act was passed, allowing the EPA to tackle the issue of water pollution and fund projects to improve water quality. However, this divided the Tunnel and Reservoir Plan into two phases. The regulations surrounding the Clean Water Act and the funding that can be balloted using it only apply to pollution-control projects, and TARP is a flood control project as much as it is a pollution-control project. Thus, TARP was split into two phases. According to the MWRD, the first phase was paid for by the EPA, tackling the mostly the pollution aspect of the project, while the U.S. Army Corps of Engineers paid for the second phase, which had more of a focus on flood control. Phase one of TARP, which was not fully completed till recently in 2006, provides the ability to capture and hold 2.3 billion volumes of liquid. Phase two is not scheduled to be completed till 2029, but when finished, it will be able to increase the volume that TARP can hold to 18.5 billion volumes of liquid.

== Sewage treatment ==
According to Hawthrone (2011), after TARP’s creation and success, the city did little to improve water quality. The issue of water quality was back-seated until the Obama administration ordered an ambitious cleanup of the Chicago River in 2011, later labeled as, "a dramatic step toward improving an urban waterway treated for more than a century as little more than an industrialized sewage canal". It was highlighted that Chicago was the last major U.S. city to skip the step of disinfecting its sewage before discharging it back into public waterways. Until then the waterways had been exempt from the tougher policies of the Clean Water Act because Chicago officials assumed that people would not want to go near the fetid channels.

MWRD

The Metropolitan Water Reclamation District of Greater Chicago (MWRDGC) had opposed the implementation of tougher water quality standards. The MWRDGC’s official reasoning for their stance was that, "it would be a waste of money" and "making the river safe enough to swim would put children at an increased risk of drowning". The main reason for their stance being summed up to the price and monetary cost of the project. The EPA, working with the support of the Obama administration, called for a plan to upgrade two of the Chicago area's biggest sewage-treatment plants so that they could disinfect the partially treated sewage and runoff that flowed into the Chicago waterways. According to CBS (2015) as well as a study by Shively (2016), this order came at the right time because the plants were not fully upgraded to handle their new functions until 2015; and Shivley's study, which analyzed the Chicago beach water quality from 2011-2013, revealed some concerning information. The study's goal was to analyze Chicago’s 9 beaches water to determine if the samples they collected exceeded the Recreation Water Quality Standard (RWQS) for E. coli. The RWQS was established and put in place by the U.S. Environmental Protection Agency. They found that out of the 2,059 water samples collected from the beaches, 285 exceeded the RWQS, for a total of 14% exceeding samples. According to Dick Durbin, the opening of the two new sewage treatments plants in Skokie and Calumet was designed to improve the overall water quality of the Chicago Area Waterway System (CAWS). The two modified plants treat the city’s runoff and sewage before its discharged into waterways by using a chlorination/dechlorination process. Although the two updated sewage-treatment plants reduce the amount of pathogenic bacteria in the water, according to CBS, there has been no plan yet to provide the same care to the Stickney treatment plant, even though the Stickney treatment plant is the world's largest sewage-treatment plant and handles more wastewater than any other treatment plant in the MWRDGC system.

== See also ==
- Schiller Woods magic water pump
