= Chicago Lake Tunnel =

Former water supply tunnel for Chicago

The Chicago Lake Tunnel was the first of several tunnels built from the city of Chicago's shore on Lake Michigan two miles out into the lake to access unpolluted fresh water far from the city's sewage.

== Waterborne disease in early Chicago ==
In the early decades of its existence, the growing city was only about three feet above the surface of Lake Michigan, and the areas of early European settlement were flat and sandy with a high water table. European settlers in Chicago only needed to dig 6 to 12 feet to create a private well. The same settlers, however, would also dig privy vaults for human waste nearby. Because the sandy soil topped a layer of hard clay, human waste would sink from the outhouse, meet the impervious clay, and travel laterally into the freshwater supply. As a result, Chicago suffered numerous widespread outbreaks of waterborne diseases. The Chicago Board of Health was organized in 1835, in response to the threat of a cholera epidemic, and later outbreaks of cholera in 1852 and 1854 killed thousands.

== Chesbrough's Water Plan ==
In 1855 the city’s newly formed Board of Sewerage Commissioners hired the 42-year-old Ellis S. Chesbrough (1813–1886), the first city engineer of Boston to study the problem. In 1863, Chesbrough completed a design for a water and sewer system for the city that included a tunnel five feet wide and lined with brick that would extend through the clay bed of Lake Michigan to a distance of 10,567 feet. Work started in 1864 and the tunnel was opened in 1867.

== Construction ==
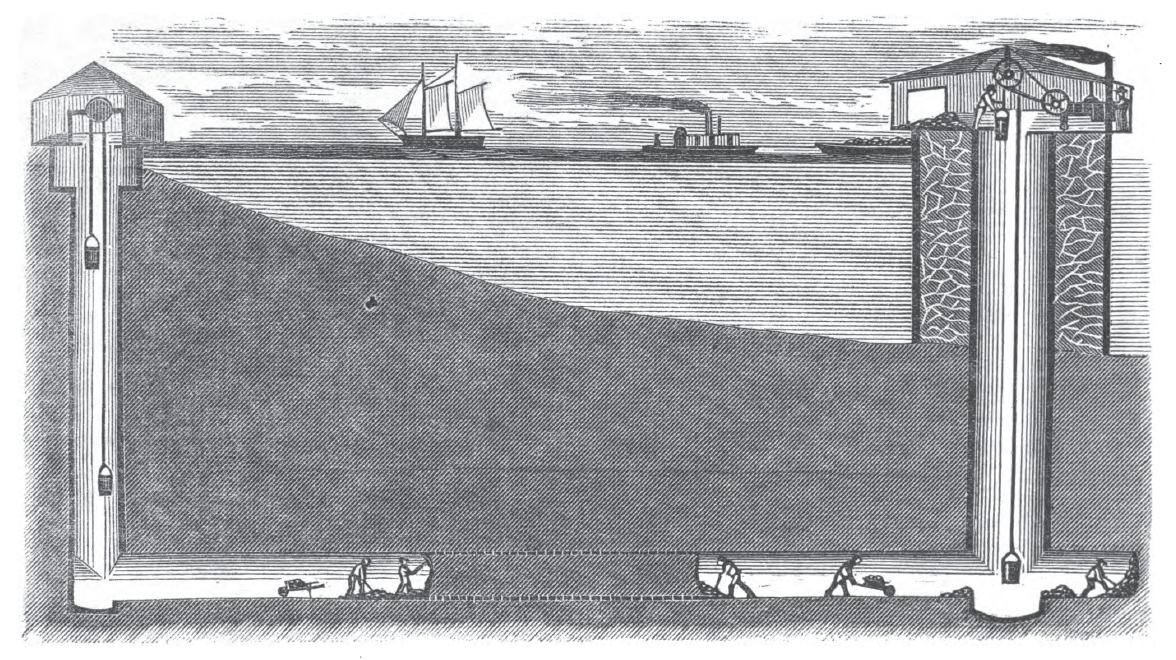
Diagram depicting construction of the lake tunnel to connect the Two-Mile Crib (in the upper right of the diagram) to onshore water works.

Gravity forces water into the tunnel through a structure called a crib. The crib for the Lake Tunnel was forty feet high and had five sides. Each side was fifty-eight feet long. The crib had outer, middle, inner walls bolted together, and each was sealed with caulk and tar in the same way ships of the day were made. The crib comprised fifteen separate water-tight compartments with an opening at the bottom twenty-five feet in diameter referred to as "the well," which directed water into the tunnel. The whole structure cost about $100,000 in the currency of the day. Builders used 618,325 feet of lumber in the crib in the following quantities:

- 538,368 feet white-pine timber
- 42,000 feet white-oak timber
- 20,000 two-inch white-pine plank
- 18,000 two-inch white-oak plank

During the construction, crews began from the intake location and the shore, tunneling in two shifts a day. Clay and earth were drawn away by mule-drawn railcars. Masons lined the five-foot-diameter tunnel with two layers of brick. The lake and shore crews met in November 1866, less than seven inches out of alignment. A second tunnel was added in 1874.

== Demolition ==
This original tunnel and crib became templates on which numerous subsequent tunnels and cribs were constructed. In 1933, the city celebrated Chesbrough’s contributions to the city's progress by placing a commemorative tablet at the Chicago Avenue water tower. The tunnel and crib, which had become known as the "Two-Mile Tunnel" and "Two-Mile Crib" were closed and demolished in 1936. Contractors first closed and pumped the water out of the well and crib. Then they poured concrete into the well, which flowed into the tunnel. The crib above the well was then destroyed, radio station WENR broadcasting the story and the sound of the final blasting.
