= Milton Horn =

American sculptor

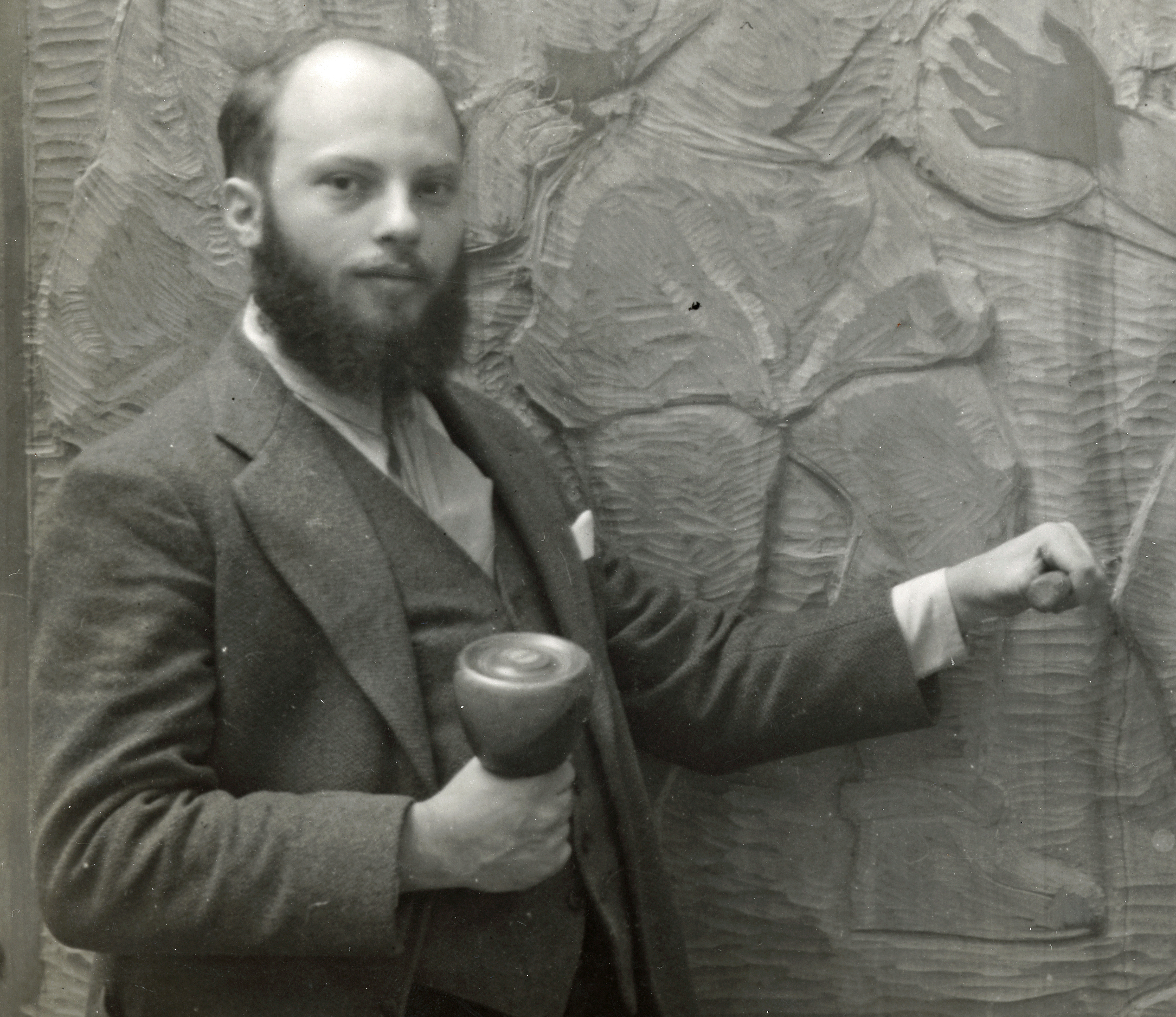
Milton Horn, c. 1937

Milton Horn (September 1, 1906 – March 29, 1995) was a Ukrainian American sculptor and artist known for work that, according to a 1957 citation of honor from the American Institute of Architects, demonstrated "the truth that architecture and sculpture are not two separate arts but, in the hands of sympathetic collaborators, one and the same".

== Early history ==
Horn was born near Kyiv, Russian Empire, on September 1, 1906. He was Jewish. In 1913, he immigrated to United States with his parents, Pinchos and Bessie. In 1917 Horn became an American citizen. He began drawing and painting in 1918. From 1921 to 1923, Horn studied with sculptor Henry Hudson Kitson and at the Copley Society, Boston. From 1923 to 1927, he studied at the Beaux-Arts Institute of Design. He was awarded a Tiffany Foundation Fellowship in 1925; his study of the Foundation's collection of Chinese paintings and Japanese prints strongly influenced the style of his drawings.

Horn was one of 250 sculptors who exhibited in the 3rd Sculpture International held at the Philadelphia Museum of Art in the summer of 1949.

== Honors and works ==
1927–28 Received his earliest commission: the sculptured ceiling for Lentheric Perfume Salon in the Hotel Savoy Plaza in New York, demolished in 1940. In 1928, he married Estelle Oxenhorn, a dancer and, later, an accomplished photographer and documentarian of his work.
1931 Honored by the New England Society of Contemporary Art in Boston by a one-man exhibition.
1932–34 Cataloged Egyptian antiquities and Coptic textiles at the Brooklyn Museum under Jean Capart.
1935 Participated in the Federal Government's Work Projects Administration.
1936 Became a founding member of the Sculptor's Guild.
1938 Completed 'Spirit of the Mail' for the United States Post Office, Swarthmore, Pennsylvania.
1939 His terracotta relief entitled "Summer" wins prize at the New York World's Fair. In 1939, Horn finished his sculpture, 'Apprenticeship of Colonel Whitin' for the United States Post Office, Whitinsville, Massachusetts.
1939–49 Served as the Carnegie Professor of Art, and Artist-in-Residence at Olivet College, Olivet, Michigan
1941 "Paul Bunyan Straightening out the Round River" for United States Post Office, Iron River, Michigan
1943–44 Collaborated with Frank Lloyd Wright on a wood relief mural for the Carlton D. Wall House in Plymouth, Michigan.
1947 Completed 'Job', a figure symbolizing the human suffering endured, without loss of faith, by the victims of World War II. In 1949 Horn moved to Chicago.
1950 Received his first commission for a synagogue, 'Not by Might, Nor by Power, but by my spirit, saith the Lord of Hosts' for the facade of West Suburban Temple Har Zion in River Forest, Illinois, with architects Loebl Schlossman & Bennett. The stone relief depicts the divine presence, the many-eyed Shekhinah, in human form.
1951 'Job' included in the first, and last, juried national show of American sculpture at the Metropolitan Museum of Art.
1953–54 Sculpted Torah ark doors for South Shore Temple in Chicago. The wooden panels are life-size depictions of two cherubim. Completed the three bronzes "The Teacher, the Mother, the Father" for the PTA headquarters in Chicago
1953–55 Received his first commission from City of Chicago, "Chicago Rising from the Lake" for the Department of Public Works. Installed high on the facade of a parking garage, the piece is now located at ground level on the Columbus Ave. bridge and the Chicago River Walk.
1954–56 Worked on "History of Medicine", four monumental relief pylons, at the West Virginia University Medical Center in Morgantown, West Virginia.
1957 Awarded Citation of Honor by the American Institute of Architects Centennial Conference, Washington, DC.
1957 "Ark-Reredos" in Silling Chapel at the West Virginia University Medical Center (Reredos): wall behind the altar, serving also as the Torah ark. Representatives of the participating faiths agreed on the shared symbolism and architecture of the Ark-Reredos.
1958 Completed bronze relief (depicting a variety of philanthropy-supported activities, such as (from left to right) child care, physical fitness, religious study, scientific research, and care for the ill) for a facade of the Jewish Federation of Metropolitan Chicago. The piece is prominently displayed indoors at 30 S. Wells, the new Jewish Federation headquarters, as of 2007.

1963–65 Worked on the monumental "Hymn to Water" for the Central Water Filtration Plant of the City of Chicago. In this, the largest of his works, the artist used poetic symbols to celebrate water as the sustaining force of life.

1963–69 Created a bronze relief "Jacob's Struggle" (1963, cast 1969), in which "Horn depicts Jacob wrestling with the Angel of God. Caught in a swirl of robes and angel wings, the two figures are locked in an embrace of struggle and love". In 1997, after Horn's death, the relief was donated to St. Thomas the Apostle Catholic Church in Hyde Park.

1971 Created the "Physician" series of 4 medieval medical relief-carved medallions in gold filled, silver, and bronze; his only work ever made for private sale. Extremely limited production: even with gold at only $36 an ounce in 1971 the gold set of 4 sold for $580.00.

1972 Honored by the National Sculpture Society.

1975 Death of Estelle Horn.

1976 Awarded Honorary degree, Doctor of Fine Arts, by Olivet College, Michigan. Elected Academician by the National Academy of Design.

1975–79 Worked on "God and Israel", dedicated in homage to his late wife

1979–94 Completed a large bronze plaque (25" × 14"), commissioned by Dr. Messaros for the Medical Center at West Virginia University (WVU), which is dedicated to his late wife. Restored the hand carved and cast plaster maquette panels of the history of medicine for installation at West Virginia University. Created and cast three bronze medallions: a portrait of Estelle, a dancer, and a child's portrait. Reworked a number of plasticine sculptures (a portrait of Franklin Delano Roosevelt, "Dancer #3" and "Noah's Ark"), made at various times in his career, with the intent of casting them in bronze. Created the Milton Horn Fine Art Trust and the Milton and Estelle Horn Fine Art Study Collection at WVU.

1989 Retrospective exhibit at the Spertus Museum of Judaica. Moved temporarily to Hampstead in London where he created a life size bronze portrait.

1992 Returned to Chicago to work on a piece he called "Rhubarb", a large plant form. Due to his illness the piece was not completed. Worked also at that time to create a large crucifixion relief panel in clay.

== After his death ==
In 2005 "Composition" (1944) is included in the permanent display of American art at the Art Institute of Chicago. Starting that same year, over eighteen works in bronze, wood, stone and terra cotta are placed at various institutions, museums and public sites by the Milton Horn Fine Art Trust. The largest project is the restoration, completion, installation and rededication of the 3 1/2-ton bronze "Chicago Rising from the Lake" north of the Chicago River on the west-facing wall of the Columbus Drive Bridge in Chicago.

== Architectural sculpture ==
- Paul Bunyan Straightening out the Red River WPA Federal Art Project, U.S. Post Office, Iron Mountain, Michigan, 1941
- Cherrywood bas relief, carved in situ, Wall Residence, Plymouth, Michigan, Frank Lloyd Wright, architect, 1944
- Not By Might, and West Suburban Temple Har Zion, River Forest, Illinois, 195
- Teacher, Mother, and Father, The Teacher, National Parents & Teachers Association Building, Chicago, Illinois, 1953
- Chicago Rising from the Lake, City Parking Facility, "the Bird Cage", Chicago, Illinois, 1954, relocated to the Chicago riverwalk at Columbus Drive.
- Engineering and Research, Fishing and Farming, Continental Apartments, Chicago, Illinois, 1955
- Reliefs, West Virginia University Medical Sciences Building Pylons, Morgantown, West Virginia, 1956
- The Spirit of Jewish Philanthropy, the Jewish Federation of Metropolitan Chicago Building, Chicago, Illinois, 1958
- Continental Can Company Reliefs, Chicago. Illinois, 1961
- Hymn to Water, Central District Filtration Plant of Chicago, Chicago, Illinois, 1966
- Man Wrests from the Earth Its Natural Resources to Build a Pathway to the Stars, National Bank of Commerce Building, Charleston, West Virginia, 1967

== In his own words ==
On the Nature of Sculpture by Milton Horn

The function of sculpture is not to decorate but to integrate, not to entertain but to orient man within the context of his universe.

Sculpture inhabits actual space in all its dimensions, and by its own inherent structural logic is able to impress upon our imagination a sense of reality. Whether it be an integral part of an architectural structure or free standing in architectural space or among nature's forms its sets up an inter-relationship between itself and its surroundings. Like life its myriad views assume new aspects under varying conditions; like life it is capable of drawing upon itself new interpretations and transcending them. Since it lives in actual space it interacts with it, measures it and is measured by it. The structure, the density or the translucency of the material, the specific life the work is to live, the rhythms of the time, which engulf the sculptor, join in the interaction and set up relationships that exist between the component. parts of the work and the whole, between the whole and its surroundings.

Sculpture is not an ersatz for man, beast, bird or any of these put together arbitrarily. Though it draws from nature structural principles, its functions are as totally different as its materials are. Transcending their physical properties, within the realm of our imagination, sculptured forms assume an aspect of the inter- dependence of all in the making of the ONE.

Sculpture is composed of concrete material interacting with thought, thought which draws its nourishment from experience with form. When concrete material and thought interact with space the resultant forms, in one way or another, recall either nature's forms or formalized aspects of nature's forms. Though sculptured forms live totally different lives from the motifs which they resemble, there is no such thing as non-representational, three-dimensional form, and yet sculpture by its very nature is an abstraction. Like architecture it is an organic abstraction in concrete form. When sculpture is wed to the architectural structure or wed to nature's forms and the topography of the site – sculpture wed to any or all of these performs the function of integrating man spiritually to his universe. Olivet College, 1948

Quoted from Milton Horn, Sculptor, see references section
