= Sawyer Water Purification Plant =

Water filtration plant in Chicago, Illinois, US

Coordinates: 41°45′25″N 87°32′42″W

The Sawyer Water Purification Plant, formerly the South Water Purification Plant, is the first water filtration plant built in the City of Chicago. When completed in 1947, it was the largest such plant in the world.

== History ==
The plant was under construction for many years, slowed by the Great Depression. Its construction was approved in 1930 and the plant began operation in 1947. Water is drawn from a crib in Lake Michigan that has an intake about 20–30 feet below the surface of the lake and is then drawn through a tunnel below the lake bed to the treatment plant, and then put through several steps to filter suspended particles and add chemicals including chlorine to disinfect the water. This system relies on pumps, not on gravity flow, to move the clean water.

Two main cribs are about 2.5 miles away from the shore. The 68th Street / Dunne cribs feed water to this filtration plant. This plant was the largest filtration plant in the world until Chicago completed its second filtration plant, the Central plant (now called the Jardine Water Purification Plant) was completed in 1964.

On September 19, 2016, the City of Chicago renamed the South Water Purification Plant to the Sawyer Water Purification Plant to honor the former Mayor Eugene Sawyer. The water filtration plant is located at 3300 E. Cheltenham Place on the South Side along the lake near Rainbow Beach Park.

== Clean water supply for Chicago and nearby suburbs ==
This plant and the Jardine Water Purification Plant supply the water for the City of Chicago and many surrounding suburbs that purchase their drinking water from the City of Chicago, about 1 billion gallons a day.

The city of Chicago has voted for a major renovation of the filtration plant in 2020. The work is estimated at $74.5 million, and will include restoration of the roof of the 1941 building and a 1964 addition.
