= Thornton Quarry =

Aggregate quarry located in Thornton, Illinois

Coordinates: 41.571°N 87.622°W

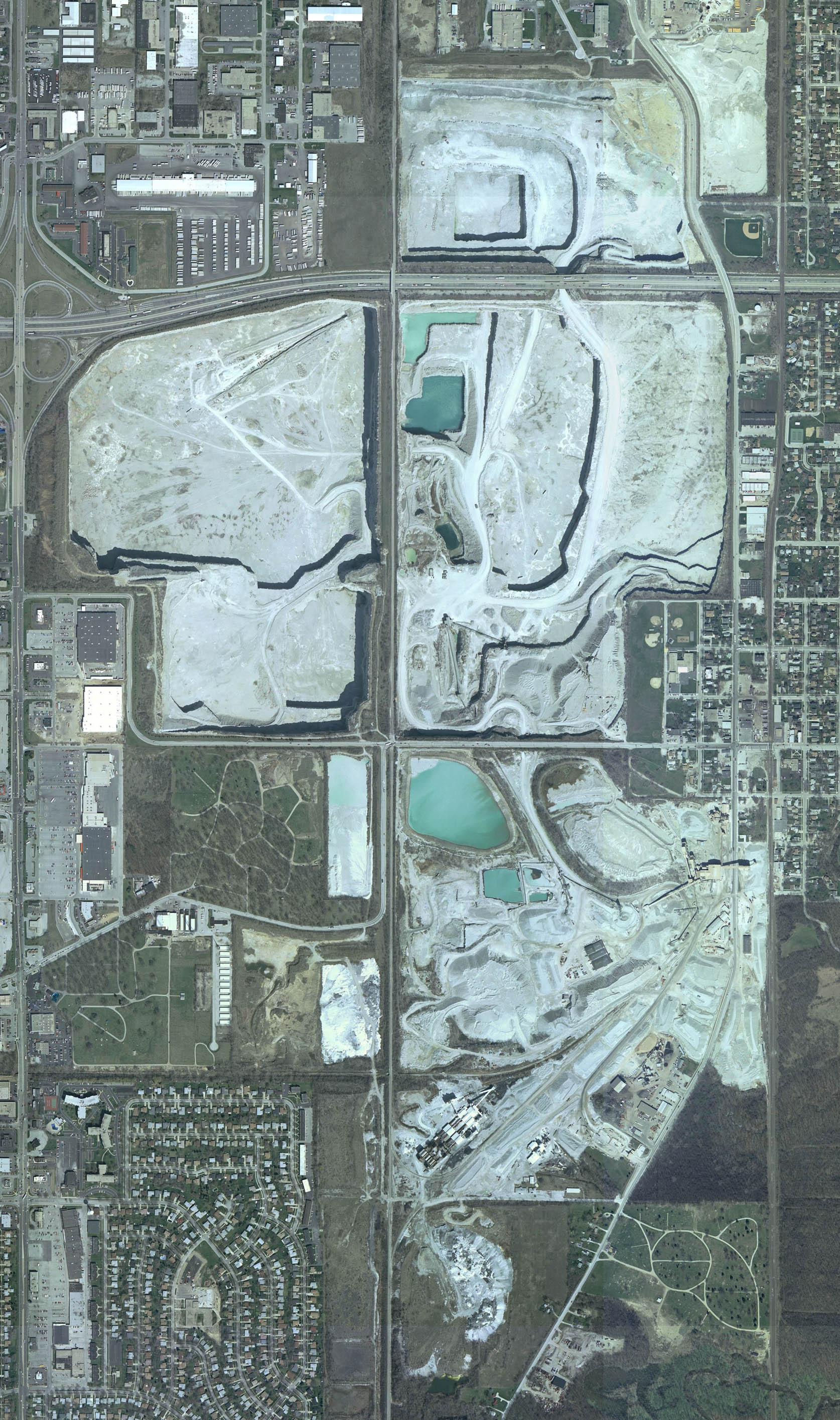
Overhead view of the quarry

Thornton Quarry is one of the largest aggregate quarries in the world, located in Thornton, Illinois, just south of Chicago. The quarry is 1.5 miles (2.4 km) long, 0.5 miles (0.80 km) wide, and 450 feet (140 m) deep at its deepest point. Gallagher Asphalt Corporation has been operating on the grounds of the quarry since 1928. A dryland dike carries Interstate 80/Interstate 294/Tri-State Tollway over the quarry.

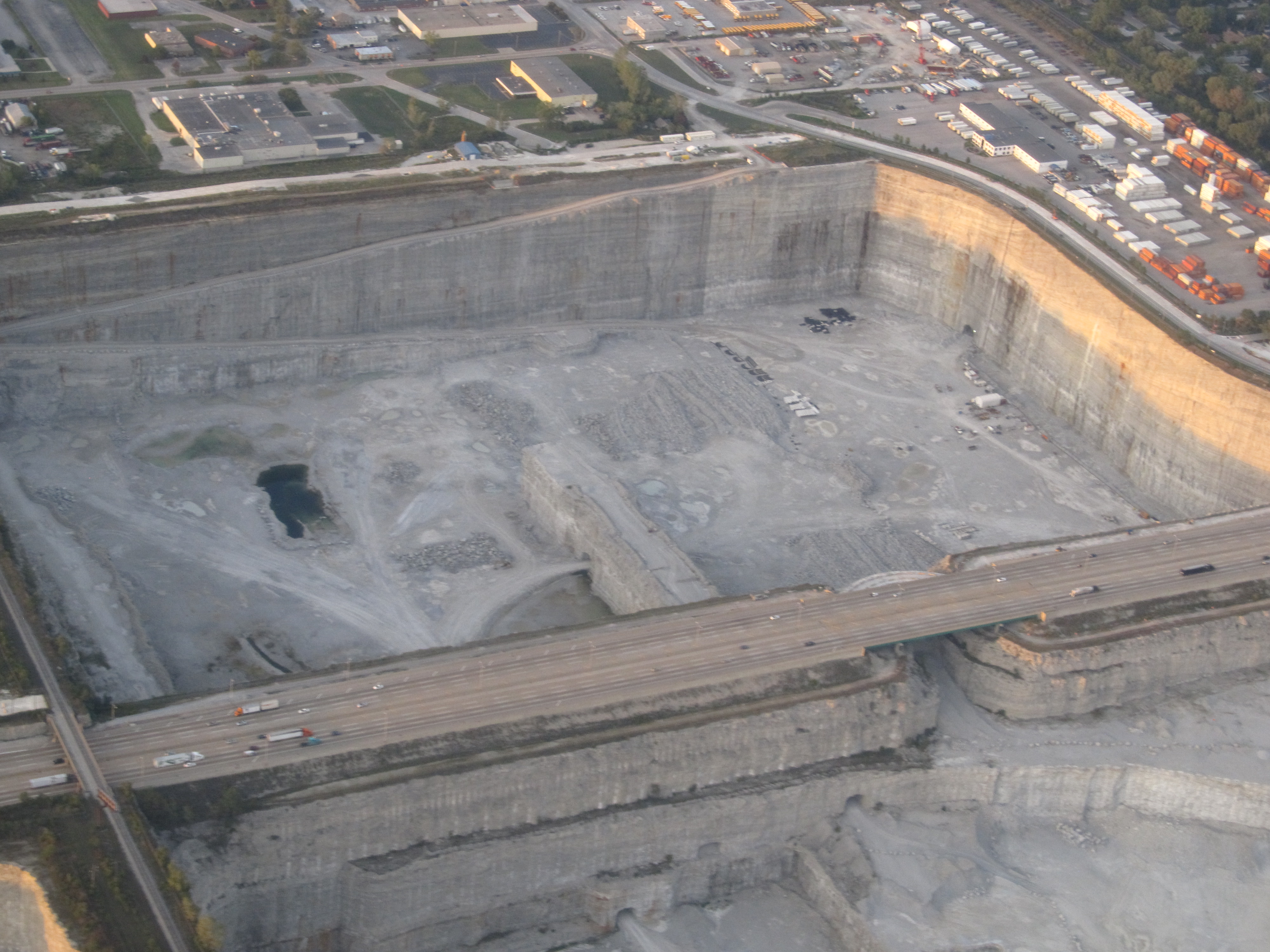
Thornton Quarry with Interstate 80/Interstate 294/Tri-State Tollway above.

As part of the Chicago Deep Tunnel project, both Thornton Quarry and McCook Quarry will serve as reservoirs to reduce the backflow of stormwater and sewage from Chicago area rivers into Lake Michigan. Thornton Transitional Reservoir contributes a 3.1-billion-US-gallon (12,000,000 m^{3}) capacity to the system, and is expected to contribute 7.9 billion US gallons (30,000,000 m^{3}) when the system is expected to be completed in 2029.

It is estimated that the reservoir will help protect 500,000 people who live in the surrounding 14 suburbs it serves, and will save the city around $40 million worth of damages each year.

The quarry contains Silurian reefs which formed when the Michigan Basin was covered in sea water more than 400 million years ago.

== History ==
The first settlers came to Thornton, Illinois, in 1834. Gurdon Saltonstall Hubbard received 160 acres (65 ha) of land from Watseka, his Potawatomi wife. In 1836 Hubbard opened the first quarry on Kinzie Street. The site was abandoned because the stone was too deep and of poor quality. Fred Gardner opened a quarry in 1846, and Stephen Crary opened one in 1850. In the early 1900s, Brownell Improvement Company purchased the entire area. Colonel Hodgkins bought the property in 1920. The quarry north of Ridge Road was opened in 1924, and a tunnel connecting the north and south quarries was developed in 1926. Colonel Hodgkins died in 1929, and Brownell repurchased the quarry in 1933. Then in 1938, Material Service Corporation purchased the property and has owned it ever since.

== Contract with MWRD ==
The Metropolitan Water Reclamation District of Greater Chicago (MWRD) contracted to use the quarry for stormwater overflow in 1998 as part of the Deep Tunnel or Tunnel and Reservoir Plan (TARP) for the metropolitan area. The Thornton Quarry supplies 7.9 billion gal US of stormwater storage, allowing the water to be treated before release into the waterways.
