= Jardine Water Purification Plant =

Water plant in Chicago

Coordinates: 41.8947°N 87.6062°W

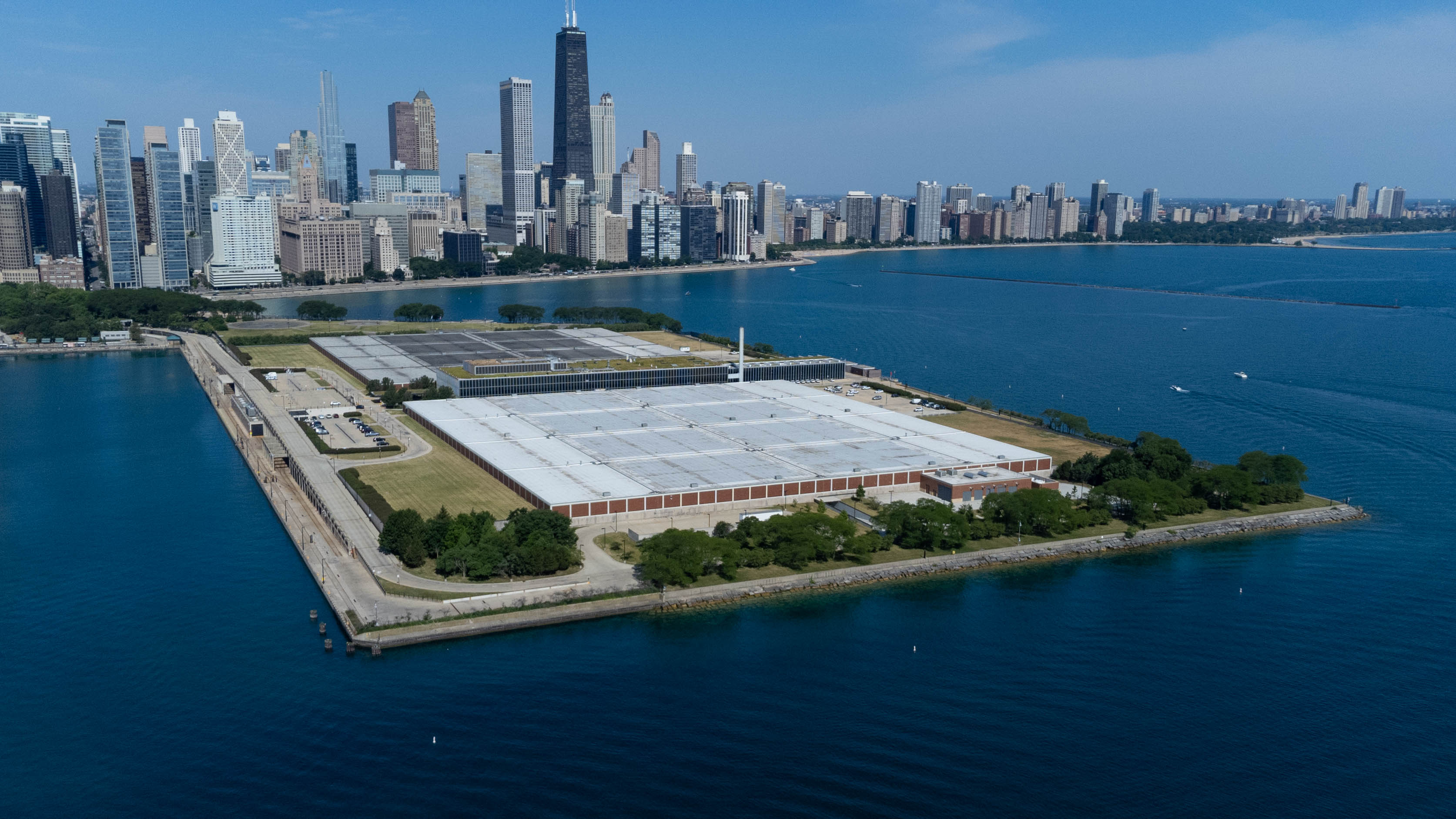
The plant in 2022

The Jardine Water Purification Plant, formerly the Central District Filtration Plant, is the world’s largest water filtration plant, purifying 1.4 billion gallons per day. It is located at 1000 East Ohio Street, north of Navy Pier in Chicago, Illinois. The plant draws raw water from two of the city's water cribs far offshore in Lake Michigan and supplies two thirds of City of Chicago consumers in the northern, downtown, and western parts of the city and to many northern and western surrounding suburbs.

The plant was constructed in the 1960s and began functioning in 1968. The plant was renamed after James W. Jardine (1908-1977), a 42-year city employee, who served as water commissioner from 1953 until his retirement in 1973. Shortly thereafter the Ohio Street Beach was formed in the bay created by the plant. Landscaping around the plant and in the adjoining Milton Olive Park was designed by Dan Kiley, and a statue, Hymn to Water, by Milton Horn graces the front entrance.

The southern portion of the city and many southern suburbs are served by a separate plant, the Sawyer Water Purification Plant. Together the two plants supply water to about 3 million households in the city and 118 suburbs.

Filtration methods used by the Jardine Water Plant is extraction and adding chemical additives; with the use of sand and gravel to filter the water, while the chemical additives being fluoride to fight off tooth decay, phosphates to avoid corrosion from the pipes, and chlorine for disinfection.
