= Ellis S. Chesbrough =

American civil engineer (1813–1886)

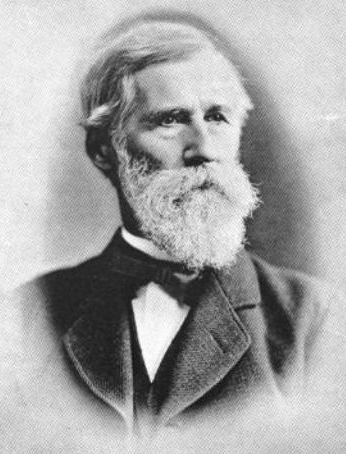
- Born: Ellis Sylvester Chesbrough; July 6, 1813; Baltimore, Maryland, U.S.
- Died: August 18, 1886 (aged 73); Chicago, Illinois, U.S.
- Spouse: Elizabeth A. Freyer
- Parent(s): Isaac M. Chesbrough, Phrania Jones
- Engineering career
- Institutions: American Society of Civil Engineers
- Projects: Chicago sewer system

Ellis Sylvester Chesbrough (1813–1886) was an engineer credited with the design of the Chicago sewer system, which are sometimes known as the 'Chesbrough sewers'. This was the first comprehensive sewer system in the United States. He is responsible for the plan to raise Chicago, construction of the first water crib in Chicago, and designing the Boston water distribution system. The water system he designed for Chicago is on the National Register of Historic Places and has been designated a Historical Civil Engineering Landmark by the American Society of Civil Engineers.

== Early life and career ==
Chesbrough was born in 1813 in Baltimore, Maryland to Isaac M. Chesbrough and Phrania Jones. Chesbrough's father was originally a farmer in Massachusetts, but he pursued other means of business, which mostly failed. One of these failed ventures forced Chesbrough to abandon regular schooling when he was nine. Chesbrough spent the next few years working for mercantile houses in Baltimore. Chesbrough's father became a surveyor for the Baltimore and Ohio Railroad in 1828, and Chesbrough became a surveyor for the city of Baltimore later that year through his father's job. Chesbrough moved to Pennsylvania in 1830 to become a surveyor for the Allegheny Portage Railroad under the command of Colonel Stephen Harriman Long. From 1831 to 1842, Chesbrough worked on the construction of railroads under the command of William Gibbs McNeill and his brother-in-law George Washington Whistler, the father of the artist James Abbott McNeill Whistler. Chesbrough worked as a farmer between 1842 and 1844 as the effects of the Panic of 1837 deprived him of employment as an engineer. After he returned to his profession, Chesbrough became the engineer for the water systems of Boston, and helped to build the Cochituate Aqueduct. He was named the first city engineer of Boston in 1851.

== Work in Chicago ==
In the late 1840s, Chicago was growing rapidly and was plagued with health issues: the majority of the city sat at water level, which meant water was unable to drain out of the city. The problem was fully realized in the summer of 1849, when a cholera epidemic struck Chicago. In response, the public held meetings and demanded that the City Council rid the city of filth. The legislature of Illinois created the Board of Sewerage Commissioners on February 14, 1855, leading to the appointment of Assistant health officers to aid the cleanup, and by August the Council resolved to build a sewage system.

Chesbrough was appointed engineer of the Board of Sewerage Commissioners because of his work on Boston’s water distribution system. From an engineering standpoint, the main problems were moving waste water out of the city and keeping it from polluting the city's drinking water supply, drawn from Lake Michigan. His plan was twofold: first, to build the sewer system above ground, and then raise all of the city buildings (see Raising of Chicago) as much as ten feet using an elaborate system of jacks. The new sewer system featured innovations such as manhole covers, which eased access to and cleaning of the sewers.

However, sewage still flowed into the lake and polluted the city's drinking water. In 1863, work began on a two-mile Chicago lake tunnel, sixty feet under the lake, out to a new intake crib. that would draw cleaner water farther from the city. Eventually, however, sewage water seeped all the way to the crib, giving Chesbrough a third chance.

Plans were made to reverse the flow of the Chicago River, leading water away from Lake Michigan and carrying Chicago's sewage into the Mississippi River. In the late 1860s, the Illinois and Michigan Canal was dredged and deepened to expand its ability to handle the city's sewage and move it away from the lake, but continued population growth quickly outstripped the canal's waste management capacity.

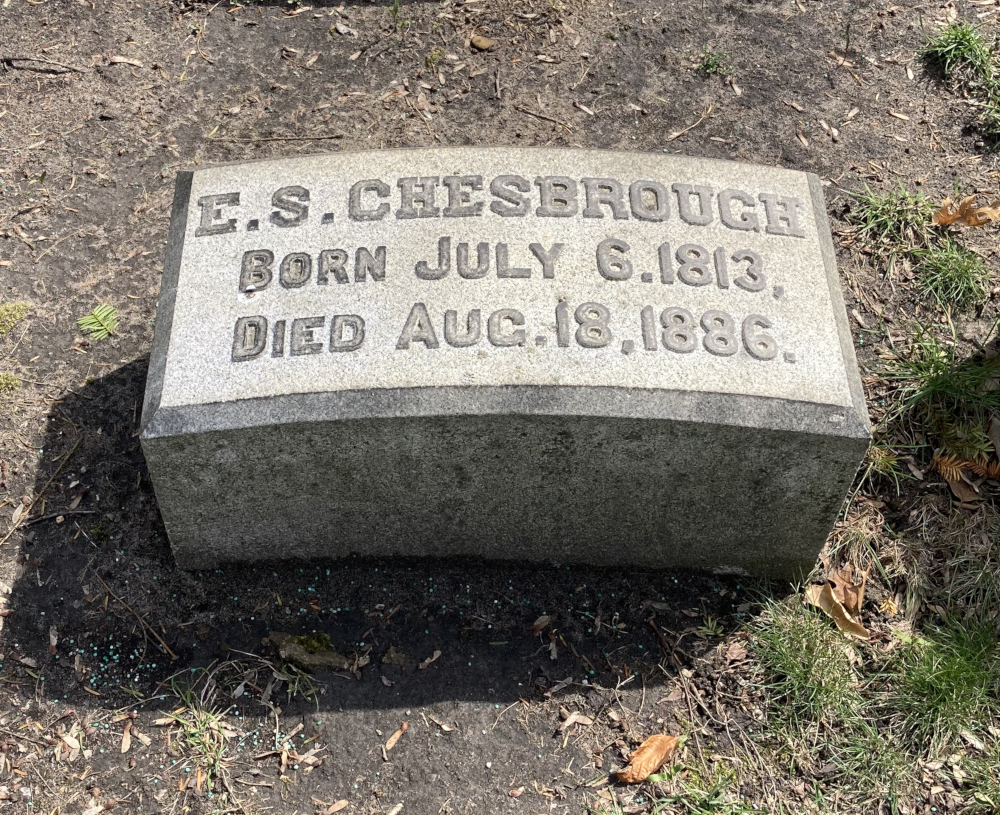
Chesbrough's grave at Graceland Cemetery

The project of reversing the river was completed after Chesbrough's death by the Sanitary District of Chicago (now The Metropolitan Water Reclamation District), created in 1889, which undertook the construction of the Chicago Sanitary and Ship Canal.

Chesbrough died in Chicago on August 18, 1886, and was buried at Graceland Cemetery.
