= Chicago Board of Health =

The Chicago Board of Health is the local board of health of the city of Chicago. Two previous iterations existed before the modern board was formed in 1932. The modern board is a policy-making body for health related matters and advises the Chicago Department of Public Health.

== First iteration ==
In 1835, the Illinois Legislature permanently created a seven-member board. This had been briefly preceded by a temporary board of health that was established in 1834 to fight an outbreak of cholera. In the mid-1850s, with transmission of cholera and smallpox being regarded as under control, the board saw its powers reduced.

Amid the economic burdens of the panic of 1857, the Chicago Board of Health was seen as an unneeded luxury, and it was abolished in 1857. Its responsibilities were transferred to the Chicago Police Department.

== Second iteration ==
In 1867, with cholera again a problem, a new Chicago Board of Health was established. Its authority was independent of the Chicago City Council and Chicago Police Department.

Beginning in July 1867, the board took measures to vaccinate people against smallpox. That year, the Board of Health successfully recommended that children be forbidden to attend public schools without a certificate of vaccination. Free vaccination was provided to school children. In 1869, the Chicago Board of Health required that all children be vaccinated.

== Present iteration ==
On May 4, 1932, the Chicago City Council created a new Chicago Board of Health. Herman Bundesen, already the Chicago City Health Commissioner, was also made the president of the board, a position he held until his death in August 1960.

In 1921, the Supreme Court of Illinois had found that the health commissioner lacked much authority, since the city had no board of health (as authorized by the state), but instead had itself established a Department of Health. The court decided that the Chicago City Council had no authority to delegate to the Department of Health authority equivalent to what the state would allow them to grant a board of health. This meant that, from 1921 until the establishment of the new Chicago Board of Health in 1932, Chicago's Commissioner of Health had little actual power.

In 1975, the Chicago City Council revised the city's municipal code to make it clear that the nine-member Chicago Board of Health was a policy-making body for health and the Chicago Department of Health is the agency which administers the city's health programs and enforces regulations.

== See also ==
- History of public health in Chicago
