= Water cribs in Chicago =

Structural protection of offshore water intakes

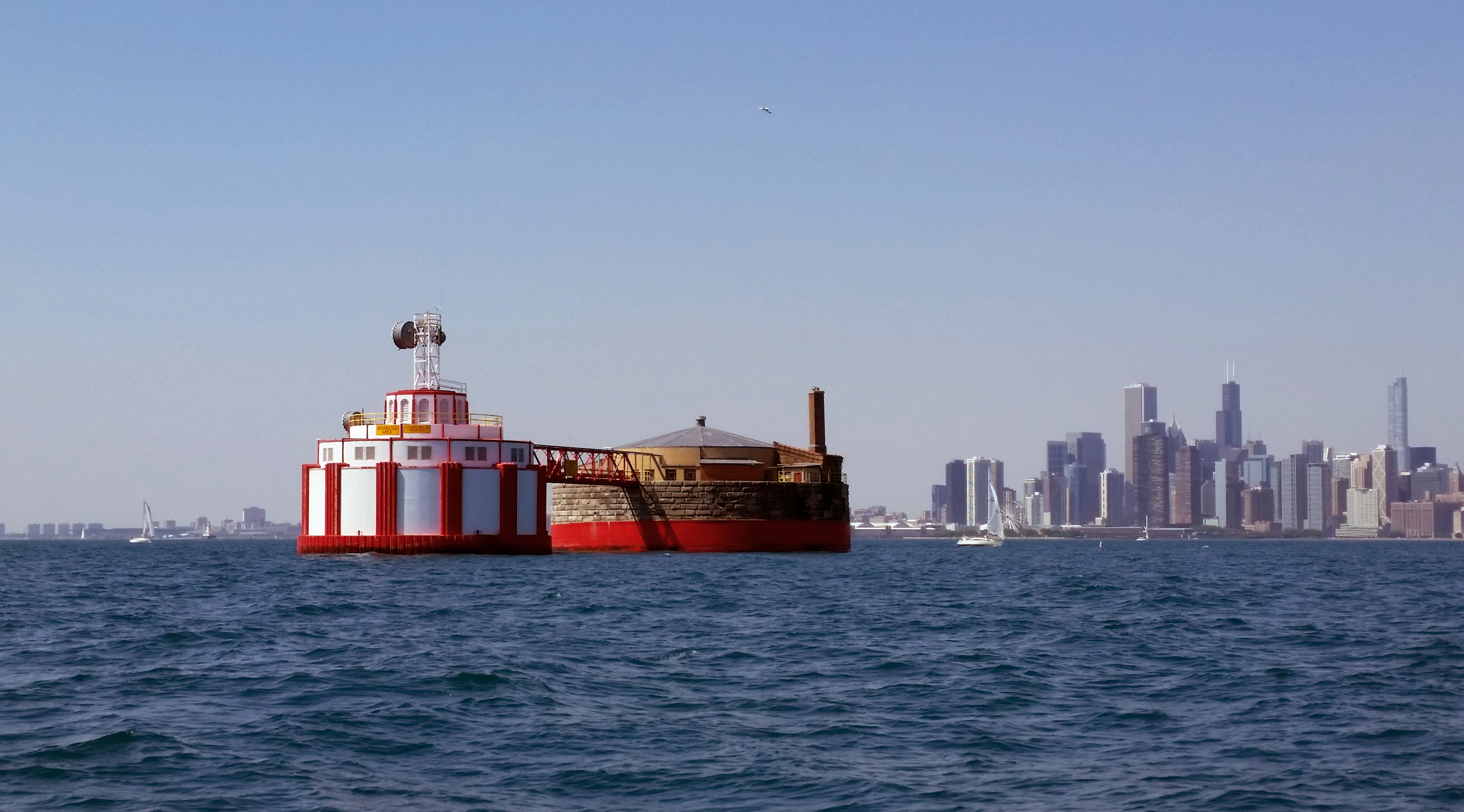
William E. Dever Crib (left) connected via a footbridge to the Carter H. Harrison Crib (right) off North Avenue Beach northeast of downtown Chicago.

The water cribs in Chicago are structures built to house and protect offshore water intakes used to supply the City of Chicago with drinking water from Lake Michigan. Water is collected and transported through tunnels located close to 200 feet (61 m) beneath the lake, varying in shape from circular to oval, and ranging in diameter from 10 to 20 feet (3.0 to 6.1 m). The tunnels lead from the water cribs to Pumping Stations located onshore, then to water purification plants Jardine Water Purification Plant (the world's largest) and the Sawyer Water Purification Plant (operating since 1947), where the water is then treated before being pumped to all parts of the city as well as 118 suburbs.

The city has had nine permanent cribs of which six are still standing and two are in active use.

== Current and former water cribs ==
Name	Year built	Location	Coordinates	Status
68th Street Crib	1892	2.3 miles (3.7 km) east of 59th Street Harbor (built adjacent to the Edward F. Dunne Crib)	41°47′10″N 87°31′54″W	Inactive
William E. Dever Crib	1935	2.6 miles (4.2 km) east of North Avenue Beach (built adjacent to the Carter H. Harrison Crib)	41°54′59″N 87°34′23″W	Active
Edward F. Dunne Crib	1909	2.3 miles (3.7 km) east of 59th Street Harbor (built adjacent to the 68th Street Crib)	41°47′10″N 87°31′54″W	Active
Four-Mile Crib	1891	3.3 miles (5.3 km). east of Monroe Harbor	41°52′22″N 87°32′45″W	Scheduled for demolition
Carter H. Harrison Crib	1900	2.6 miles (4.2 km) east of North Avenue Beach (built adjacent to the William E. Dever Crib)	41°54′59″N 87°34′23″W	Unusable due to tunnel collapse in 1998
Lake View Crib	1896	1.9 miles (3.1 km) east of former Montrose Boulevard	41°57′52″N 87°36′06″W	Demolished in 1924
Lawrence Avenue Crib	1915	0.3 miles (0.48 km) east of former Montrose Boulevard	41°58′13″N 87°38′48″W	Abandoned; surrounded by Lincoln Park landfill.
Two-Mile Crib	1865	2.0 miles (3.2 km) east of Chicago Avenue	41°54′25″N 87°35′23″W	Demolished
Wilson Avenue Crib	1918	2.1 miles (3.4 km) east of Montrose Point	41°57′58″N 87°35′28″W	Scheduled for demolition

== Two-Mile Crib ==
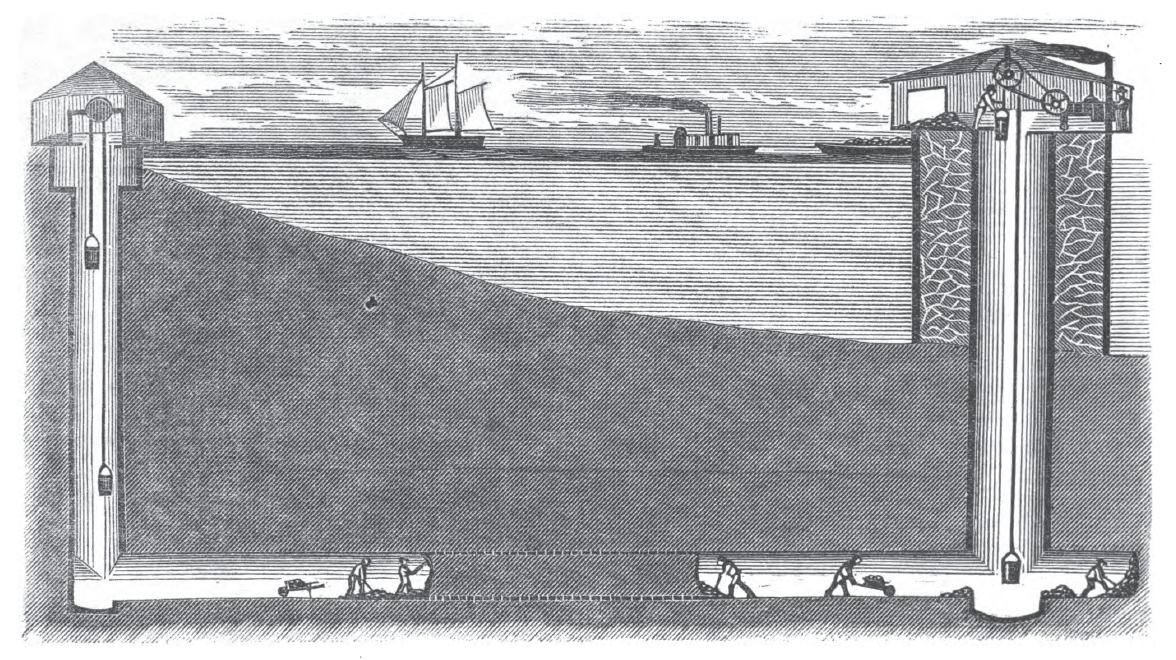
Diagram depicting construction of the lake tunnel to connect the Two-Mile Crib to onshore water works.

The Two-Mile Crib was constructed as part of a scheme by Ellis S. Chesbrough in 1865, to help with the purification of the water because of damage caused by the city dumping sewage into the lake. Construction of the crib began in May 1864, miners and workers worked 24 hours a day and six days a week. Workers excavated the intake tunnel by hand from both the shore and the offshore crib, using mule-drawn railcars to remove the spoil. The two headings met in November 1866 with an alignment discrepancy of less than 7 inches (18 cm). The total completion of the project was in March 1867 and cost the city $380,784. Purified water was pumped to the Chicago Avenue Pumping Station which still stands to this day on North Michigan Avenue.

== Four-Mile Crib ==
The Four-Mile Crib was put into service in 1891 to help with the problem of getting uncontaminated water to Chicago and various neighborhoods. To deal with this, a new crib was built even farther than the Two-Mile Crib. The brick alone cost $472,890.93, but the total project cost was $1,526,143.68. This crib was special, as there was a steam heating plant installed in 1898. This kept the crib at a temperature of 70 °F (21 °C) and allowed plant workers to reside there during the winter, who helped to stop the formation of ice. In 1932, the Bureau of Lighthouses reported that a submarine cable had been laid and two rooms had been added on to the crib.

== 68th Street Crib / Edward F. Dunne Crib ==
The 68th Street Crib was built in 1892 two miles offshore from the eastern end of 68th Street. A concrete hexagon-shaped crib with a brick structure atop, it originally supplied two tunnels, a 20-foot (6.1 m) diameter tunnel to the Jardine Water Purification Plant and a 10-foot (3.0 m) diameter tunnel to the South Water Purification Plant (later renamed to the Eugene Sawyer Water Purification Plant). The crib was equipped with a navigational warning light atop a steel-skeleton lighthouse and a fog bell that tolled every 12 seconds when needed.

The Edward F. Dunne Crib was built in 1909. Named after Chicago Mayor Edward Fitzsimmons Dunne, who was in office at the time crib plans were approved, the 110-foot (34 m) diameter circular crib stands in 32 feet (9.8 m) of water and houses a 60-foot (18 m) diameter interior well connected to two new tunnels. The Dunne Crib is situated 50 feet (15 m) from the 68th Street Crib and accessible by a steel footbridge, allowing one set of keepers to service both cribs.

During the construction of the tunnel to the Edward F. Dunne Crib, a temporary crib known as the Intermediate Crib was built along the tunnel route, 7,500 feet (2,300 m) from shore. On the morning of January 20, 1909, a fire broke out on the Intermediate Crib in a wooden barracks which housed tunnel workers. Approximately 70 men perished in the fire or drowned attempting to escape it. Survivors took refuge on floating cakes of ice and were rescued by boat.

== Carter H. Harrison Crib / William E. Dever Crib ==
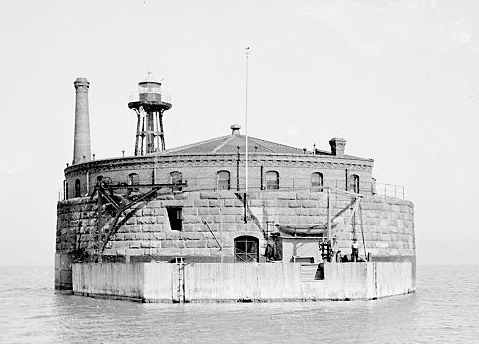
Carter H. Harrison Crib in 1910

The Carter H. Harrison Crib (named for Mayor Carter Harrison IV) replaced the Two-Mile Crib in 1900, which was later replaced by the William E. Dever Crib built alongside it in 1935. Due to an increasing demand for water, the Harrison Crib continued in service until 1997. In 1998 the tunnels leading from the Harrison Crib to shore were drained for inspection, a process that was surrounded by controversy. Some experts feared that pumping the tunnels dry would result in a catastrophic collapse, while others guaranteed that collapse was not possible. Portions of the tunnel did in fact collapse. City lawyers soon filed suit against the engineers and contractors. The suit charged that the engineers, Alvord, Burdick & Howson, were negligent for advising the city that it was safe to drain the tunnels. It also charged that Luedtke Engineering Co., of Michigan, did the work in a way that caused the collapse. As a result, the city spent $5.3 million to fill in a portion of the tunnel under Lake Shore Drive to prevent a possible additional collapse. The water intake tunnel leads to the Central Park Avenue Pumping Station.

The Harrison-Dever crib has weather monitoring instruments and is used by the National Weather Service Chicago office for Lake Michigan forecasts.

== Wilson Avenue Crib ==
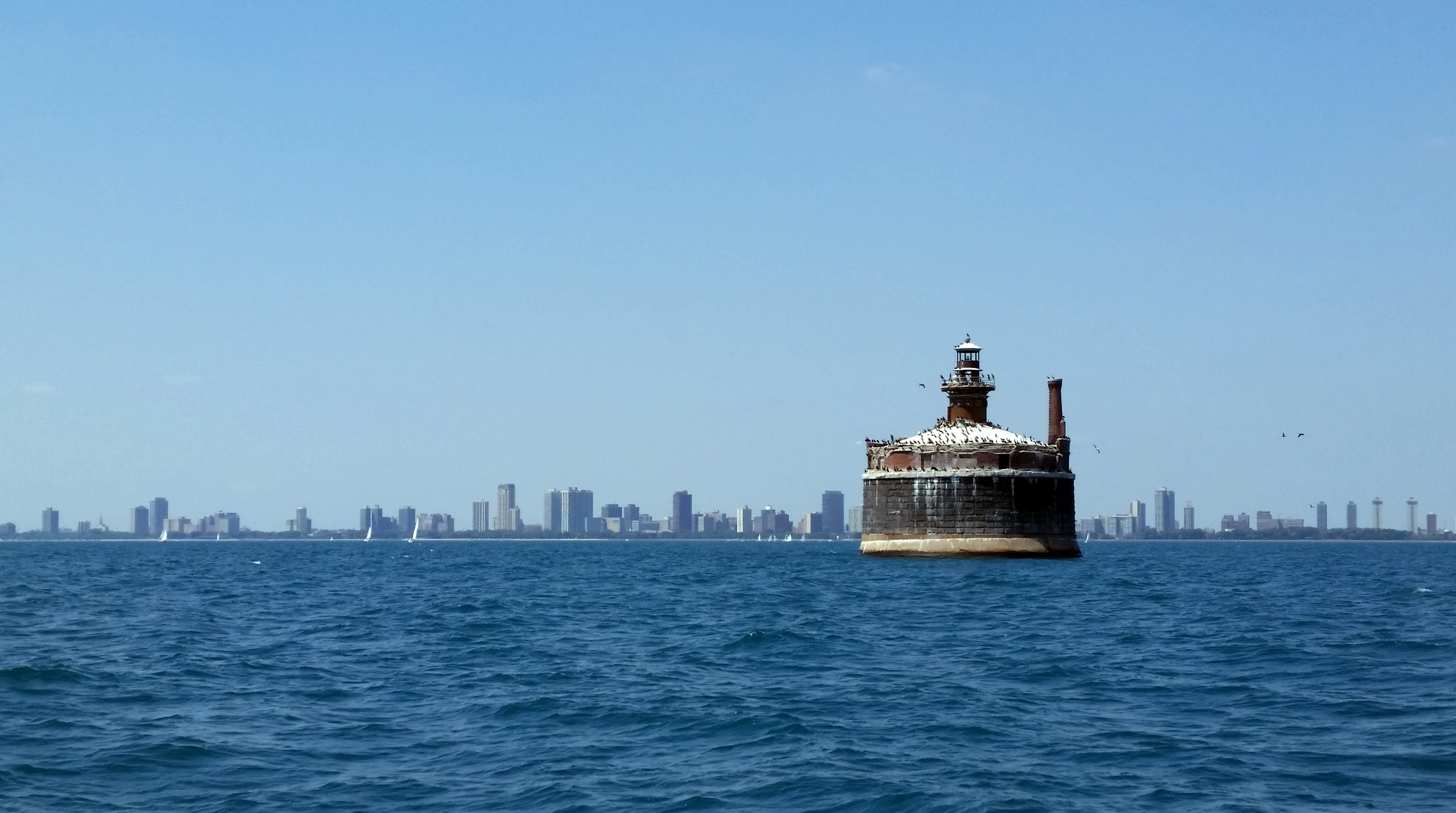
Wilson Avenue Crib

The Wilson Avenue Crib is located approximately two miles east of Montrose Point. Work on the 90-foot (27 m) diameter crib began in 1915 and was completed May 1, 1918 after a delay to correct an out-of-plumb structure due to settling. The superstructure is rough-hewn granite block atop a steel caisson enclosing a 40 feet (12 m) diameter inner well chamber.

Originally supplying eight miles of water tunnels, the crib has since been designated as a standby crib and is scheduled for demolition in the city's 2015-19 Capital Improvement Program.
