= 1954 floods of Northeastern Illinois =

Major rainfall and flood event

The 1954 Floods of Northeast Illinois were caused by a heavy rainfall that occurred from October 9 to October 11, 1954, across portions of northern and northeastern Illinois, especially in the vicinity of the Chicago Metropolitan Area. Rainfall up to 12.5 inches (32 cm) occurred from multiple waves of rainfall over a 48-hour period, with the majority occurring from late evening on October 9 through the afternoon of October 10. Flood-related damages across northeastern Illinois were estimated to be at least $25 million (equivalent to $300 million in 2025), with $10 million (equivalent to $120 million in 2025) in the Chicago area alone.

== Background ==
Prior to 1954, the heaviest rainfall event known in the Chicago area occurred on August 2–3, 1885, when 6.36 inches (16.2 cm) occurred over a 2-day period and caused flooding in the area. Prior to this event, contemporary records considered 0.75 inches (1.9 cm) in a day as a "heavy rainfall" event. Although weather records in the city of Chicago are continuous back to 1871 (the date of the Great Chicago Fire) and sporadic back to the 1840s, weather data was collected at only one location near today's Chicago Loop for most of the early part of the city's history. By 1950, observations were also taken at Chicago Midway Airport and multiple pumping stations and water reclamation plants across the city. Despite the limited available data, it is possible that the 1885 rainfall event was the largest in Chicago area history for the nearly seven decade period that followed.

== October 1954 event ==
Late in the evening of October 9, 1954, a low pressure area in northwest Kansas was attached to stationary boundary that extended eastward toward far southern Michigan. Multiple waves of thunderstorms then occurred ahead of the low pressure area near the front leading to widespread heavy rainfall and significant flash flooding and river flooding.

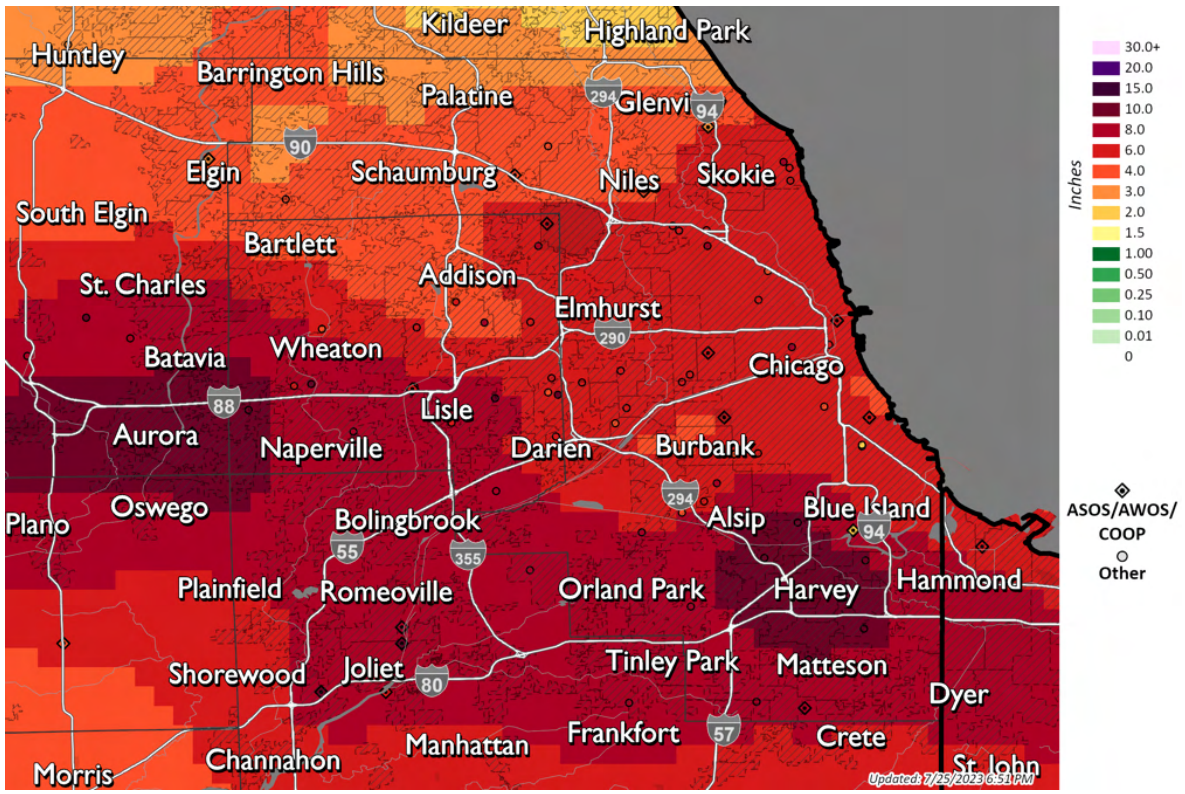
Rainfall in the Chicago Metropolitan Area of northeastern Illinois on October 9–11, 1954.

=== Rainfall ===
Beginning around 6:00 PM on October 9, multiple thunderstorms formed in northern Illinois. These storms were along a line from the west-northwest to the east-southeast across portions of the Chicago metro area. These cells moved to the northeast and exited the area by around 8:00 PM after causing generally light rainfall accumulations. Just a few hours later a new line of thunderstorms formed from near the Quad Cities, Iowa/Illinois, to near Chicago. These storms moved generally to the east, impacting some of the same areas multiple times, which caused several inches of rainfall to accumulate by the overnight hours of October 10. This line of thunderstorms diminished around 6:00 AM on October 10. Light rainfall occurred again across northern Illinois between 8:00 AM and 2:00 PM. Shortly after 2:00 PM, thunderstorms rapidly developed along an east–west oriented line in almost the same location as thunderstorms from the prior evening. These storms moved generally east southeast, then evolved in a squall line by around 5:00 PM on October 10. This squall line moved more quickly to the southeast and moved out of northern Illinois by the morning of October 11. In total, widespread rainfall of 3.0 inches (7.6 cm) to 8.0 inches (20 cm) occurred across northeastern Illinois, with peak rainfall up to 12.5 inches (32 cm) near Westmont, Illinois, over a 48-hour period. Up to 11.1 inches (28 cm) occurred in the immediate vicinity of Chicago.

=== Flooding ===
Widespread flooding of structures and roadways were reported across the Chicago metropolitan area. In Chicago, flooding caused an estimated $10 million (equivalent to $120 million in 2025) in damage, while $25 million (equivalent to $300 million in 2025) in damage was caused across the Chicago metro area. Flash flooding impacted numerous roadways, underpasses, and basements across the area, including several square blocks of the Chicago suburb of Harvey, Illinois. The basements of both the main Chicago post office building and the Chicago Daily News newspaper were flooded. Rainfall caused the Chicago River to rise above flood stage in and near the Chicago Loop, which flooded basements of multiple buildings and the tracks of Union Station. Along the South Branch of the Chicago River, flooding caused two major power plants to shut down. To reduce the impacts from flooding, the Chicago Harbor Lock was opened for the first time since it was constructed at the mouth of the river in the 1930s.

Outside of Chicago, flash flooding occurred in urban areas and along creeks across large portions of the metropolitan area and rural areas to the west. Multiple rivers experienced flooding across northern Illinois, including the Chicago River, Little Calumet River, Des Plaines River, Du Page River, Fox River, Kankakee River, and the South Branch of the Kishwaukee River.

=== Aftermath ===
Due to the combined sewer system of Chicago and the immediate suburbs, storm runoff entering the Chicago River typically contains a combination of rainfall and sewage. Floodwaters from the Chicago River can enter Lake Michigan, the source of the area's drinking water, if the river is "reversed" (back to the original flow direction). The opening of Chicago Harbor Lock caused untreated sewage mixed with rain water to enter the lake. Water samples were taken on a regular basis to determine if the drinking water supply was contaminated. Residents using well water were advised to boil drinking water across the region.

This event previously held the state record for a 24-hour rainfall at an official climate station in Illinois with 10.58 inches (26.9 cm) recorded at Aurora, Illinois. This record was exceeded just a few years later by a heavy rain event east of St. Louis, only to be superseded by another heavy rainfall event in and near Aurora in 1996.
