= T.J. O'Brien Lock and Dam =

Coordinates: 41.6521°N 87.5672°W

T. J. OBrien Lock and Dam
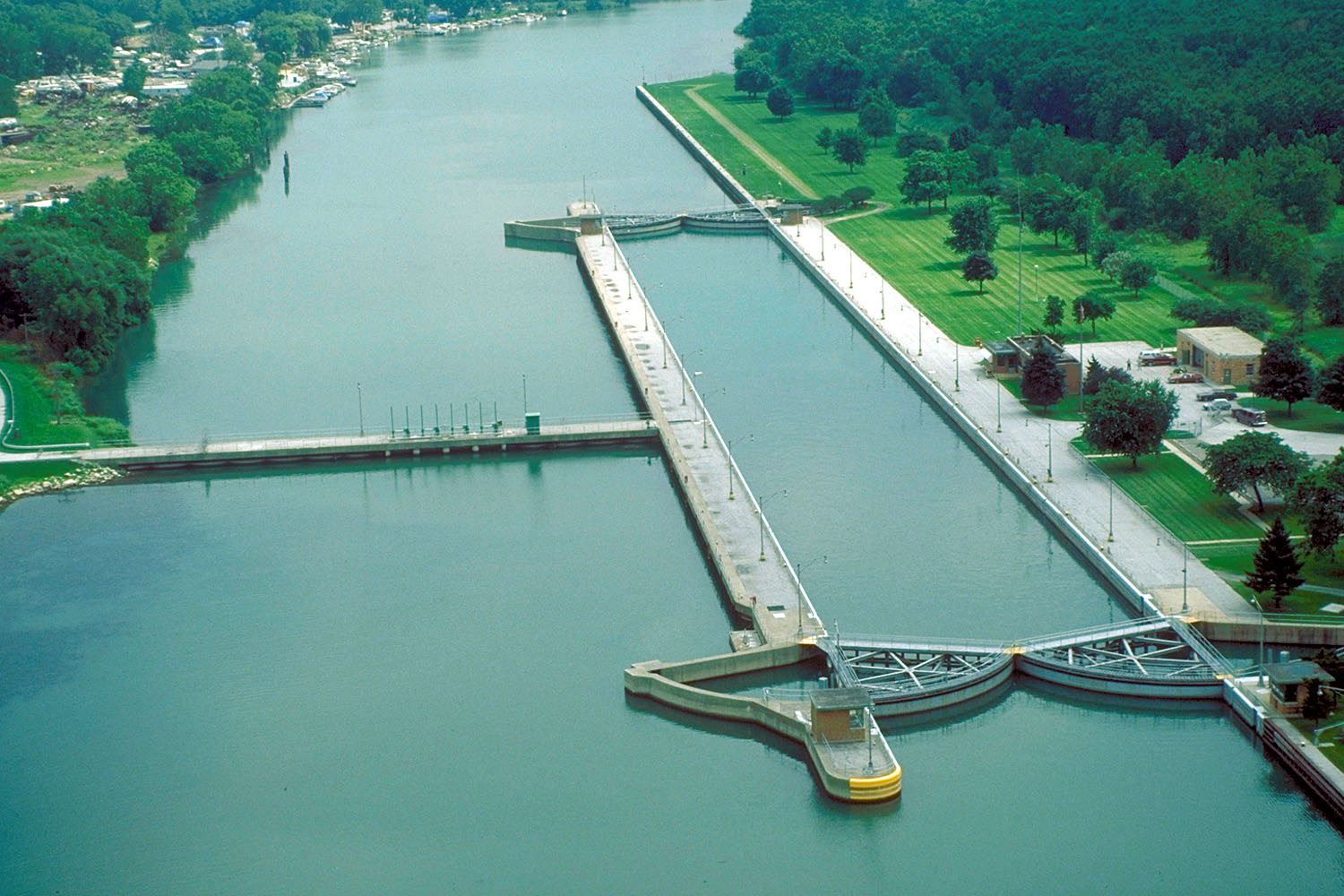
- Interactive map of T. J. OBrien Lock and Dam
- Location: Hegewisch, Chicago
- Purpose: Flood control, navigation
- Construction began: 1957
- Opening date: 1960
- Construction cost: $6,954,700
- Built by: Fitz Simmons & Connell Dredge & Dock Company
- Designed by: United States Army Corps of Engineers
- Operator: United States Army Corps of Engineers Chicago District

Dam and spillways
- Type of dam: 4 sluice gates
- Impounds: Calumet River to Lake Michigan harbor
- Length: 297 feet (91 m)

Reservoir
- Normal elevation: 577 feet (176 m) above sea level

Thomas J. O'Brien Lock & Dam is a stop lock in the Hegewisch neighborhood on the South Side of Chicago at the confluence of the Grand Calumet River and Little Calumet River, which form the Calumet River. It is a component of the Chicago Area Waterway System (CAWS), which is, itself, a part of the Illinois Waterway, which links the Mississippi River and the Great Lakes.

The Lock & Dam is named for Thomas J. O’Brien, who was a U.S. Representative for the 6th District of Illinois from 1933 to 1938 and again from 1943 to 1964.

== Overview ==
The lock and dam are 326 river miles (525 km) from the Mississippi-Illinois confluence. The lock chamber measures 1,000 by 110 feet (305 m × 34 m) with a maximum lift capability of 5 feet (1.5 m). The lock contains a pair of sector gates at either end, which were chosen as they both reduce the cost of engineering and are more conducive to operations in a waterway which can reverse direction. The dam measures 293 feet (89 m) and includes 4 vertical sluice gates.

The lock and dam are used to maintain a 9-foot navigation channel, and for flood control purposes, primarily to limit diversion from the lake during normal periods, and mitigation of backflows into Lake Michigan during large storm events which reverse the direction of the river.

== History ==
Predating the lock and dam was the Blue Island Lock, constructed at the eastern end of the Cal-Sag Channel in 1922. Nearly as soon as its completion, there was already lobbying by various industries along the waterway to expand the size of the lock, which measured 360 by 50 feet (110 m × 15 m). A report by the United States Army Corps of Engineers (USACE) in 1933 proposed, among other things, expanding the size of the lock to 600 by 110 feet (183 m × 34 m) to improve navigation. It would not be until 1946 when Congress would authorize funding for the improvements to the Cal-Sag Channel. The location of the new lock and dam 7 miles (11 km) upstream from the old controlling works at Blue Island was chosen to improve the ability to control backflow events into the lake during heavy storms from the polluting industries along the Grand Calumet River and Little Calumet River and the outfall of the Calumet Water Reclamation Plant. Construction began in 1957, and was completed in 1960. However, the lock portion was not put into operation until July 1, 1965, when the Blue Island Lock was finally decommissioned.

== See also ==
- Illinois Waterway Lock and dams
- Chicago Harbor Lock, located on the Chicago River
