= Chicago Area Waterway System =

Complex of natural and artificial waterways in Chicago, Illinois

Coordinates: 41°42′N 87°57′W

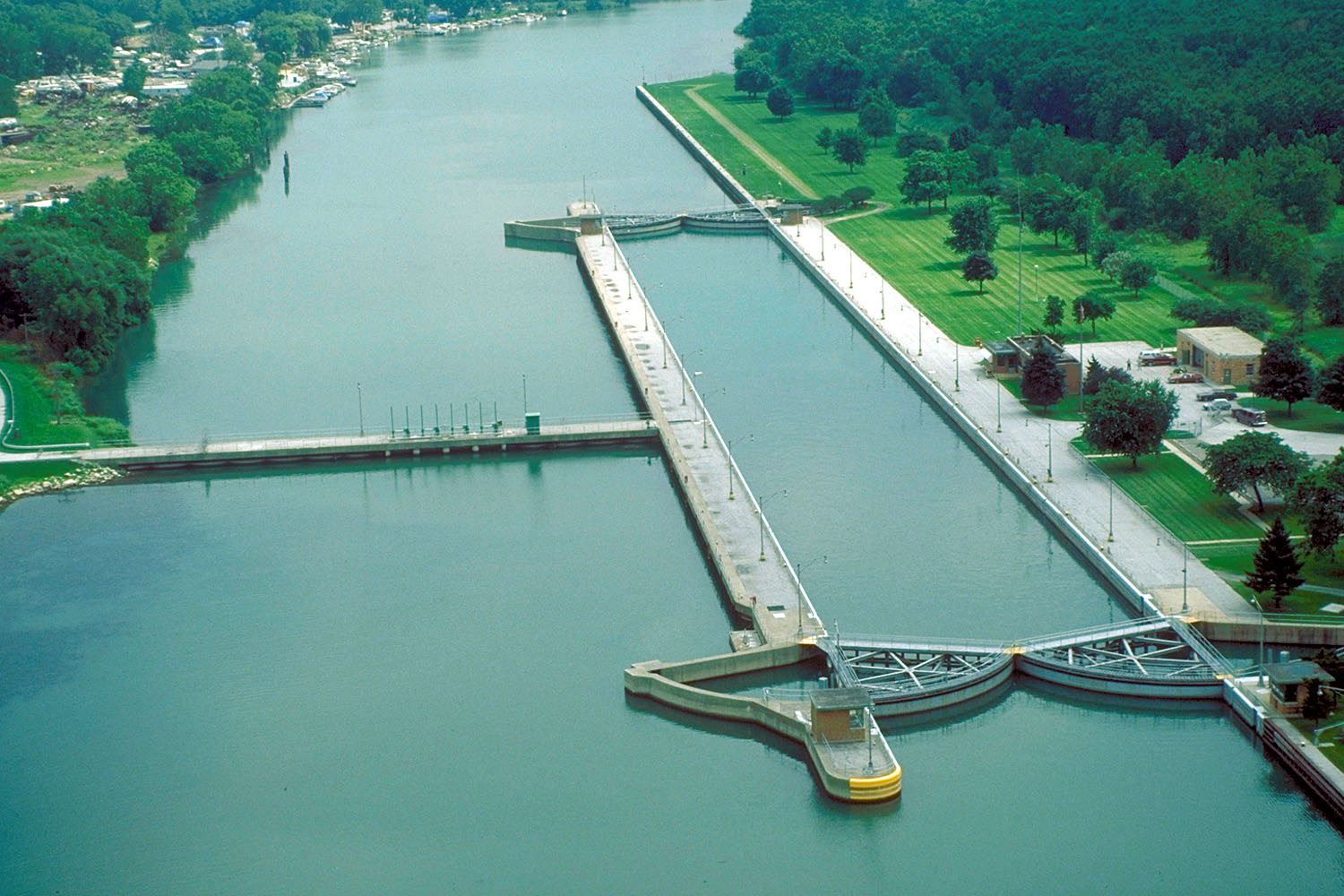
Thomas J. O'Brien Lock & Dam, one of two major locks in the CAWS

The Chicago Area Waterway System (CAWS) is a complex of natural and artificial waterways extending through much of the Chicago metropolitan area, covering approximately 87 miles altogether. It straddles the Chicago Portage and is the sole navigable inland link between the Great Lakes and the Mississippi River and makes up the northern end of the Illinois Waterway.

The CAWS includes various branches of the Chicago and Calumet Rivers, as well as other channels such as the North Shore Channel, Cal-Sag Channel, and Chicago Sanitary & Ship Canal. The CAWS ends near the Lockport Navigational Pool, the highest elevated of the eight pools of the Illinois Waterway. There are three major locks within the CAWS, operated by the Army Corps of Engineers: the Chicago Harbor Lock, the Lockport Lock & Dam, and the T.J. O'Brien Lock and Dam.

Artificial waterways connecting the Mississippi and Great Lakes systems via the Chicago area, over the Chicago Portage, began with the I&M Canal in 1848. The CAWS as it exists today began to take shape in 1900, with the construction of the Chicago Sanitary & Ship Canal to reverse the flow of the Chicago River (and eventually the Calumet River), which previously flowed into Lake Michigan, so as to instead flow toward the Mississippi River, thus carrying sewage away from the City of Chicago. Thereafter, additional artificial waterways were built that became part of the CAWS, such as the North Shore Channel, which runs inland from Wilmette to the Chicago River and was constructed in 1910, and the Cal Sag Channel, which provides a direct path from the Calumet River to the Illinois Waterway and was finished in 1922.

In the 21st century, a focus of concern around the CAWS has been its potential role as a corridor for Asian carp to enter Lake Michigan. Suits in district court and before the United States Supreme Court have been unable to obtain an injunction requiring the connection between the CAWS and the Mississippi drainage to be closed.

== List of waterways ==
Waterways within the CAWS include:

- Cal-Sag Channel
- Calumet River
- Chicago River
- Chicago Sanitary & Ship Canal
- Grand Calumet River (partial)
- Little Calumet River (partial)
- North Shore Channel
