= Calumet Aquifer =

Aquifer just south of Lake Michigan

The Calumet Aquifer is an aquifer underlying the land at the extreme southern tip of Lake Michigan. It underlies the northern third of Lake County, Indiana, and the northern tenth of Porter County, as well as small parts of LaPorte County and Cook County, Illinois. It is notable chiefly for its high levels of contamination by industrial waste from factories and toxic waste dumps in the Calumet Region. It is bordered to the south by Valparaiso Moraine Aquifer, and to the north by Lake Michigan. It is underlain by a Silurian bedrock aquifer complex.

Cities on top of the aquifer include Gary, Hammond, and East Chicago. The aquifer sits in unconsolidated deposits of fine sand and glacial till in the Calumet Lacustrine Plain, with some occasional lenses of peat and gravel and areas of slag fill. As a result, it is especially vulnerable to contamination from surface sources. The aquifer has never been extensively used as a source of water, local communities instead drawing water from Lake Michigan.

The area above the Calumet Aquifer receives an average of 36 inches of precipitation per year. Twelve inches per year are recharged into the aquifer. The storage coefficient of the aquifer is 0.12, which because the aquifer is unconfined, means that it yields about 12% water by volume.

As a groundwater aquifer, the Calumet Aquifer provides water to local surface waterways, including the Grand Calumet River and Little Calumet River. The contributions can go in both directions: when the Little Calumet is in flood stage, it rises above the aquifer level and water from the river enters the aquifer. The aquifer also receives water from the Valparaiso Moraine Aquifer to the south, via the bedrock system that underlies both. Over most of its area, the aquifer averages 15 feet (4.6 m) in saturated thickness and lies approximately 15 feet (4.6 m) below the surface. Its greatest saturated thickness is around 45 feet (14 m).

The Calumet Aquifer is sometimes subdivided into the Calumet Aquifer and Lacustrine Plain Aquifer, with the Calumet Aquifer proper occupying a relatively narrow band along Lake Michigan, and also underlain by the Lacustrine Plain Aquifer in the subtill layer.

== Works cited ==
- Little Calumet River, Flood Control and Recreation Project: Environmental Impact Statement. 1995.
- Buszka, Paul M. (2011). Relation of Hydrologic Processes to Groundwater and Surface-Water Levels and Flow Directions in a Dune-Beach Complex at Indiana Dunes National Lakeshore and Beverly Shores, Indiana. United States Geological Survey.
- Fenelon, Joseph Martin; Watson, Lee R. (1993). Geohydrology and Water Quality of the Calumet Aquifer (PDF).
- Greeman, Theodore K. (1995). Water levels in the Calumet Aquifer and their relation to surface-water levels in northern Lake County, Indiana, 1985-92. United States Geological Survey. pp. 1–61. doi:10.3133/wri944110.
- Hartke, Edwin J.; Hill, John R.; Reshkin, Mark (1975). Environmental Geology of Lake and Porter Counties, Indiana: An Aid to Planning (PDF). Indiana Department of Natural Resources.
