= North Shore Channel =

Drainage canal in Illinois, US

Coordinates: 42°02′28″N 87°42′35″W

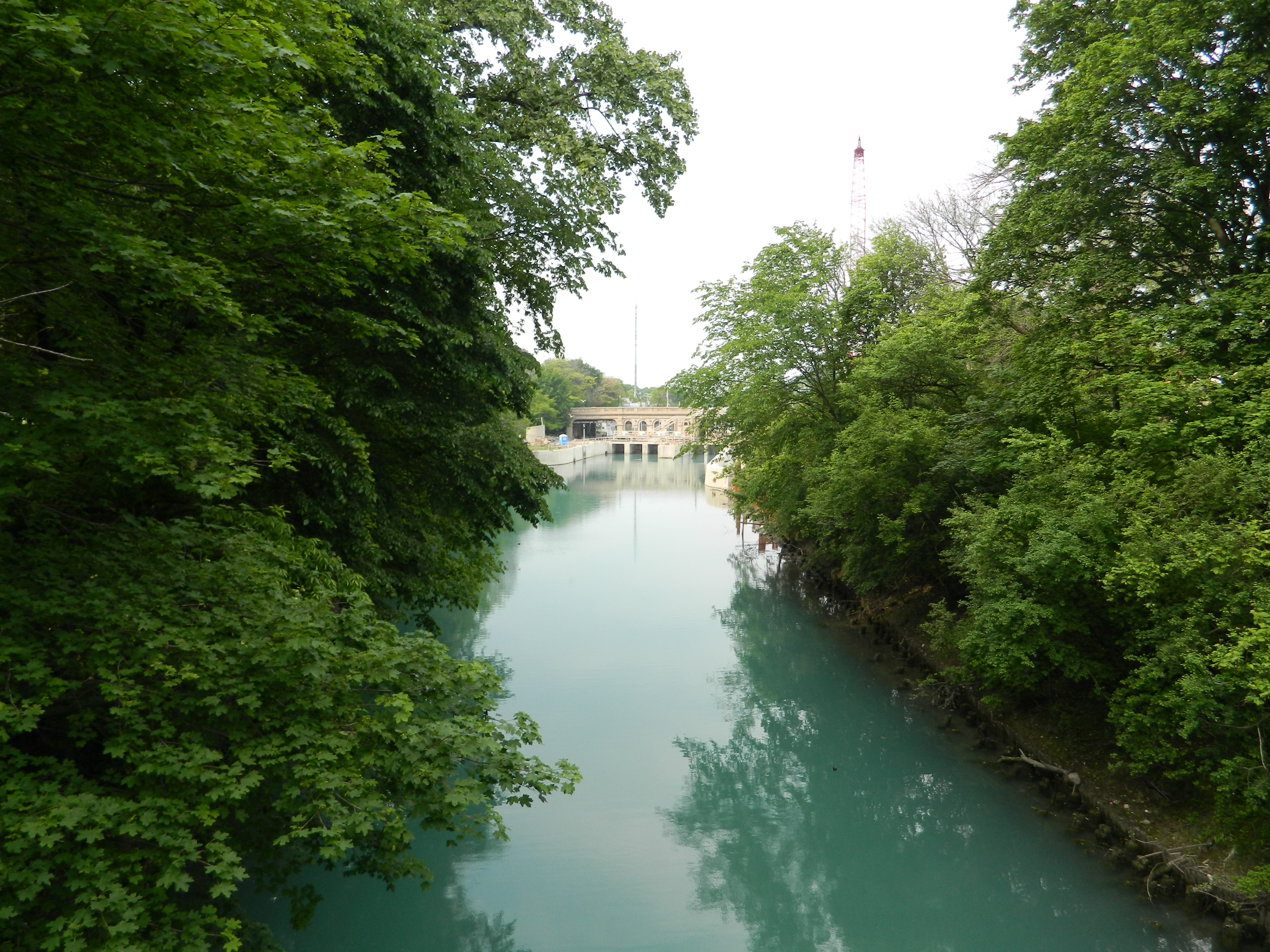
- The North Shore Channel near the Bahá'í House of Worship in Wilmette, Illinois
- Interactive map of North Shore Channel

Specifications
- Length: 7.7 miles (12.4 km)
- Navigation authority: Metropolitan Water Reclamation District of Greater Chicago

History
- Date completed: 1910

Geography
- Start point: Lake Michigan in Wilmette, Illinois
- End point: North Branch Chicago River in Chicago, Illinois
- Branch of: North Branch Chicago River

The North Shore Channel is a 7.7 mile long canal built between 1907 and 1910 to increase the flow of North Branch of the Chicago River so that it would empty into the South Branch and the Chicago Sanitary and Ship Canal. Its water is generally taken from Lake Michigan to flow into the canal at Wilmette Harbor. Its carrying of excess run-off in high water events has been largely taken over by the Chicago Deep Tunnel, but there are still occasional intentional discharges back into the lake, as flood prevention in times of very heavy rains, causing episodic concern regarding effects on lake water quality.

== Geography ==
The North Shore Channel, a component of the Chicago Area Waterway System (CAWS), flows from Lake Michigan, near the Bahá'í House of Worship in Wilmette, Illinois, to the North Branch of the Chicago River in Chicago.

The channel begins at the Wilmette Pumping Station, where sluice gates are generally used to provide for a consistent water level in the channel by controlling water diversion from Lake Michigan, although the gates are opened during severe storm weather conditions to allow the channel to backflow into the lake in order to prevent downstream flooding. From the pumping station, the channel flows southwest, and then south, through or near Wilmette, Evanston, Skokie, and Lincolnwood, and into Chicago. The south end of the channel flows into the North Branch at approximately 5100 north and 3000 west in the Chicago street-address numbering system. A concrete low head dam, 82 feet (25 m) in width and 8 feet (2.4 m) in height, was constructed at the confluence of the channel and river in 1910, creating Chicago's only waterfall within the city limits. Because the water surface of the North Shore Channel would be 4 feet (1.2 m) lower than that of the river's, the dam was built to prevent the river from eroding its banks upstream of the confluence due to the difference in the water surface elevations.

However, the dam exacerbated existing problems of stagnant water flows and ponding on the North Branch for decades, despite multiple modifications to the dam and dredging of the river. The Tunnel and Reservoir Plan (TARP) would eventually solve those issues along the North Branch, and starting in July 2018, the Army Corps of Engineers removed the dam, replacing it with a series of riffle pools, which allow fish to swim upstream.

Surrounded by parks and steep, wooded banks, and the 18-hole Canal Shores Golf Course in parts of Wilmette and Evanston, the canal provides a corridor for local wildlife.

In 1999, the system of which the canal is a part was named a Civil Engineering Monument of the Millennium (as part of the Chicago wastewater system) by the American Society of Civil Engineers (ASCE).

== General recreation ==
Since the water quality improvement, fishing has become possible in the Channel. Bass and crappie are abundant, especially at the confluence of the Channel and the North Branch of the Chicago River, where the waterfall aerates the water. Canoeing and kayaking are allowed, with several put-in points along the length.

In recent years the Channel has also become a popular rowing venue. It is home to the Chicago Rowing Foundation, Loyola Academy, New Trier High School and Northwestern University teams. The Channel is a great place for rowing due to its high banks that act as a shelter from the wind. The northern part of the Channel has hosted the University of Wisconsin and Syracuse University men's rowing teams for dual meets in 2016 and 2019.

In addition to water navigation, both walking and biking paths follow along nearly the entire length of the Channel. The Evanston-Wilmette Community Golf Course ("Canal Shores") plays along a stretch of the Channel of about 1 mile (1.6 km), and two par-3 holes play across it.

== North Shore Channel Trail ==
North Shore Channel Trail map

The North Shore Channel Trail is a multi-use trail that starts at Lincoln Square near West Lawrence Avenue and North Francisco Avenue and stops in Evanston at Green Bay Road. Proposals are being considered to complete the final mile and a half of the trail, which would connect the path to Gillson Park at the Wilmette lakefront.

Several recent improvements were completed in 2019, including the Lincoln Village Pedestrian Bicycle Bridge and just past where the channel merges with the north branch of the Chicago River, the 312 RiverRun and its Riverview Bridge. Other attractions along the trail include the Skokie Northshore Sculpture Park, which boasts over 60 large sculptures along the channel, the Evanston Ecology Center, and the Ladd Arboretum. As of July 2023, construction has begun on a skate park at Twiggs Park along the trail.

== See also ==
- Cycling in Chicago
