= Ladd Arboretum =

Arboretum in Evanston, Illinois, United States

Coordinates: 42.0568°N 87.7006°W

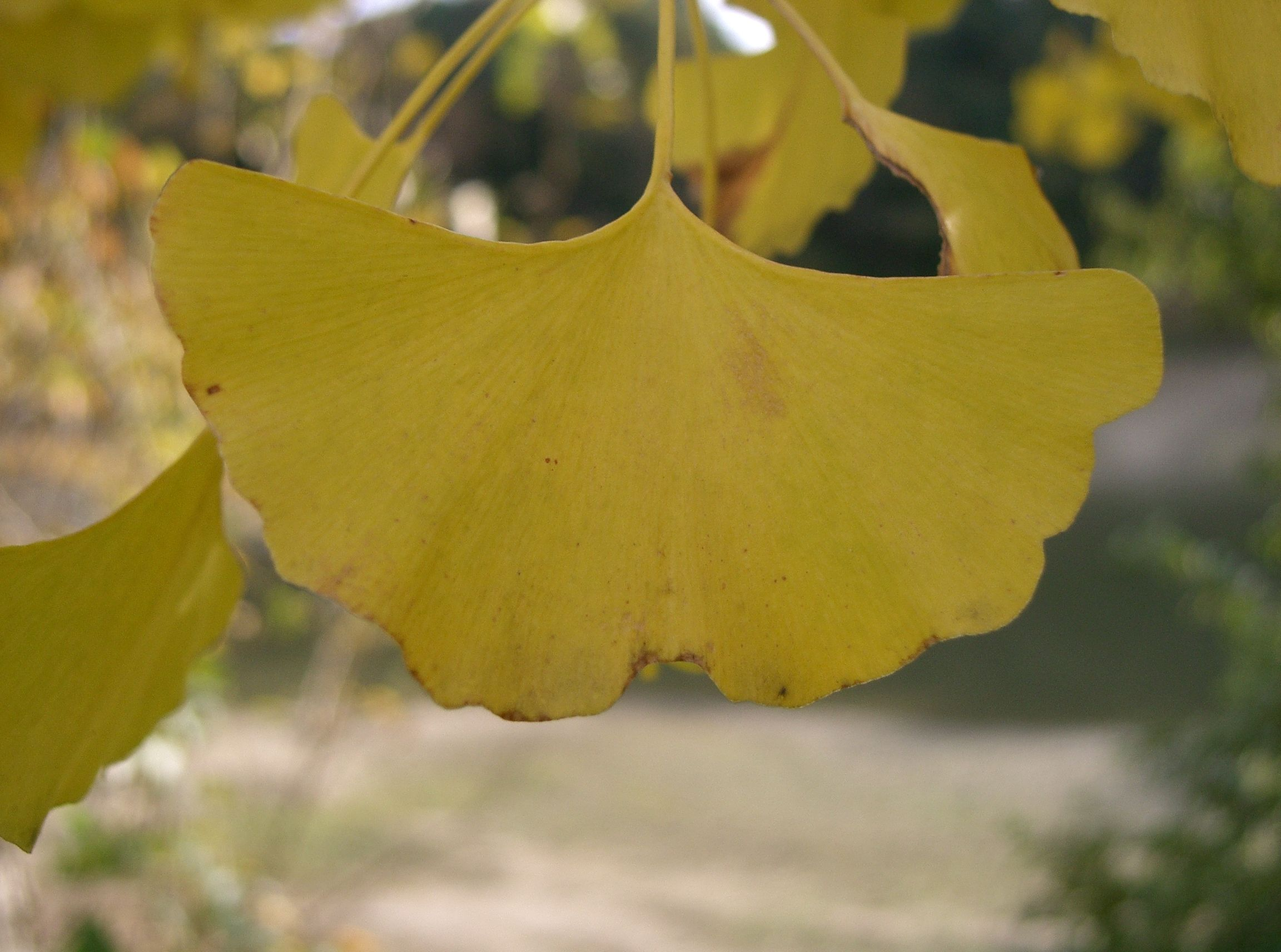
- Leaf of ginkgo biloba, the first species of tree planted in Ladd Arboretum
- Interactive map of Ladd Arboretum
- Location: 2024 McCormick Boulevard, Evanston, Illinois
- Area: 23 acres (9.3 ha)

The Edward R. Ladd Arboretum is an arboretum located at 2024 McCormick Boulevard, Evanston, Illinois, occupying 23 acres (9.3 ha) in a narrow .75 miles (1.21 km) stretch between McCormick Boulevard and the North Shore Channel on land leased from the Metropolitan Water Reclamation District of Greater Chicago.

The first tree, a ginkgo, was planted by the Evanston Review in the memory of Edward Rixon Ladd (1883–1956), its founder, publisher, and editor. The Arboretum was formally dedicated the following year, on June 10, 1960, after many other trees were planted.

The arboretum's collection is arranged by plant family (birch, legume, maple, oak, and pine). Gardens include the Meadow Garden, Prairie Restoration Area, Cherry Tree Walk, Nut Tree, Rotary Club of Evanston's International Friendship Garden (with All-America Rose Selections), Women's Terrace, gazebo, and bird sanctuary.

The Evanston Ecology Center is the arboretum's nature education facility. The Center features natural history exhibits of fossils, seeds and mounted animal specimens, and offers weekend, after school, summer camp, school and adult nature programs.

== See also ==
- List of botanical gardens in the United States
- Morton Arboretum
- North Shore Channel Trail
