= Grand Calumet River =

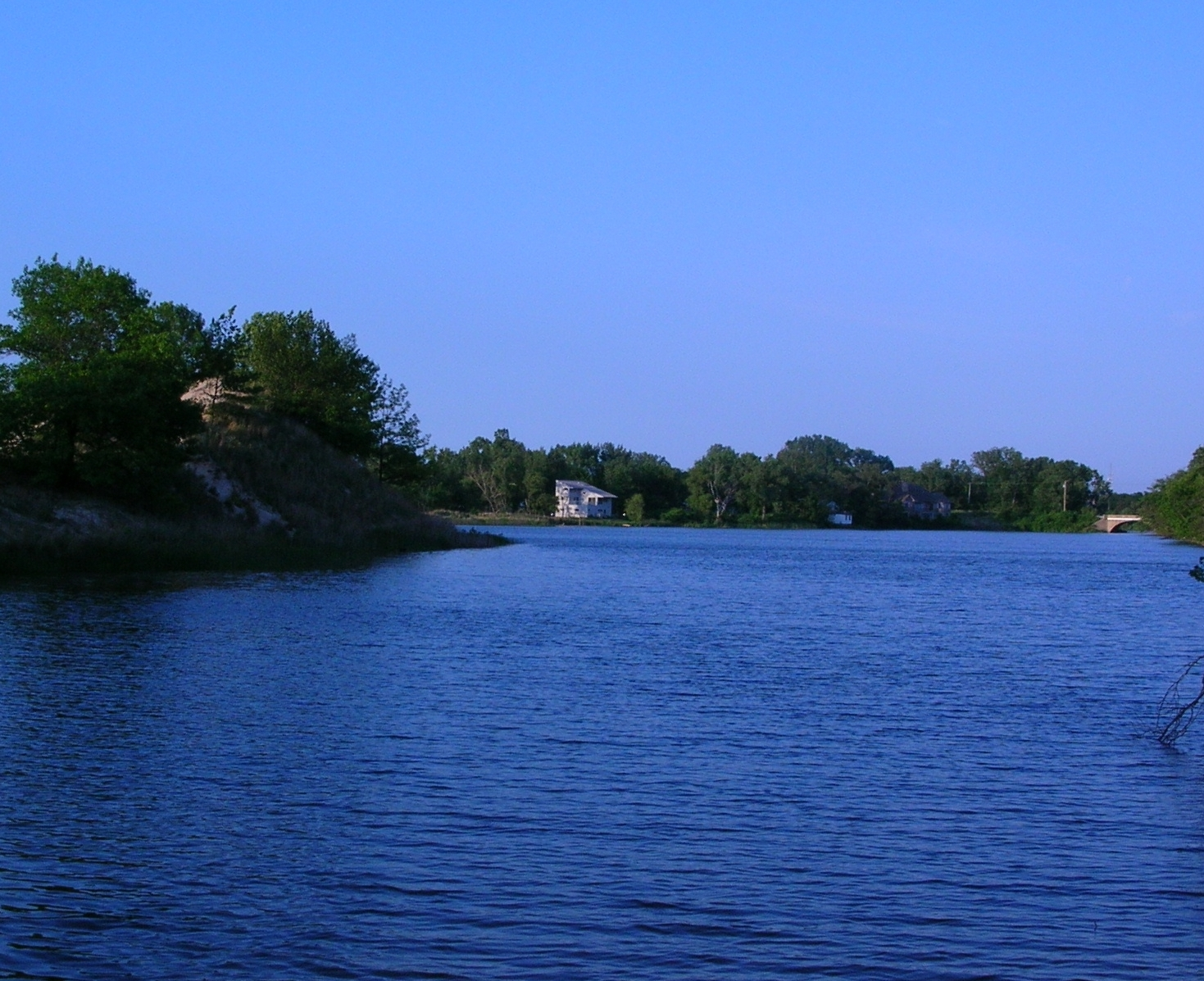
- The Grand Calumet near its headwaters in Miller Beach, at the Middle Lagoon
- Etymology: "Grand" to distinguish from Little Calumet. Origin of "Calumet" uncertain, possibly from one of several Miami or Potawatomi hydronyms

Location
- Country: United States
- State: Indiana, Illinois
- County: Lake County, Cook County

Physical characteristics
- Source: Marquette Park (Gary)
  - location: at the Miller Lagoons, Miller Beach, Indiana
  - coordinates: 41°37′04″N 87°15′34″W
  - elevation: 581 ft (177 m)
- Mouth: Indiana Harbor and Ship Canal
  - location: East Chicago, 10 miles from the headwaters, Lake County, Indiana
  - elevation: 577 ft (176 m)
- Length: 13.0 mi (20.9 km)

The Grand Calumet River is a 13.0-mile-long (20.9 km) river that flows primarily into Lake Michigan. Originating in Miller Beach in Gary, it flows through the cities of Gary, East Chicago and Hammond, as well as Calumet City and Burnham on the Illinois side. The majority of the river's flow drains into Lake Michigan via the Indiana Harbor and Ship Canal, sending about 1,500 cubic feet (42 m^{3}) per second of water into the lake. A smaller part of the flow, at the river's western end, enters the Calumet River, and through the Illinois River ultimately drains into the Mississippi River.

Today, a large portion of the river's flow originates as municipal and industrial effluent, cooling and process water and storm water overflows. Although discharges have been reduced, a number of contaminants continue to impair the area. The river is among the country's most severely polluted, and as of 2015 was in the late stages of a major dredging project to remove thousands of tons of contaminated sediment and rehabilitate the river ecosystem.

== Course ==
The Grand Calumet is divided into an East and West branch, on the respective sides of the Indiana Harbor Canal. The East Branch, which drains entirely into Lake Michigan, rises in Marquette Park in Gary's Miller Beach neighborhood, passing through a series of three lagoons - two of which are partially located within the Miller Woods unit of Indiana Dunes National Park - before flowing through the industrial zone of Gary. It leaves Gary by passing under Cline Avenue, and then defines the boundary between East Chicago and Hammond until reaching the Indiana Harbor Canal near Kennedy Avenue.

The West Branch drains partly into the Indiana Harbor Canal and partly into the Calumet River, which drains into the Chicago Area Waterway System and ultimately into the Illinois River. The divide between the part of the West Branch flowing into the Illinois River and the part flowing to Lake Michigan is in Hammond, Indiana, near the Illinois-Indiana state line. The West Branch joins the Little Calumet at Burnham, Illinois.

In addition, the Indiana Harbor Canal itself is sometimes treated as a part of the Grand Calumet, which brings the river's total length to 16.0 miles (25.7 km).

== Geology ==
The Grand Calumet flows through the Calumet Lacustrine Plain, a region of low, undulating sandy terrain adjoining Lake Michigan. Groundwater contributions to the river, which account for less than 10% of total flow, come from the Calumet Aquifer, an unconfined water-table aquifer. The Calumet Aquifer is less than 10 feet below the surface in most areas, and has an average thickness of 40 feet.

== History ==
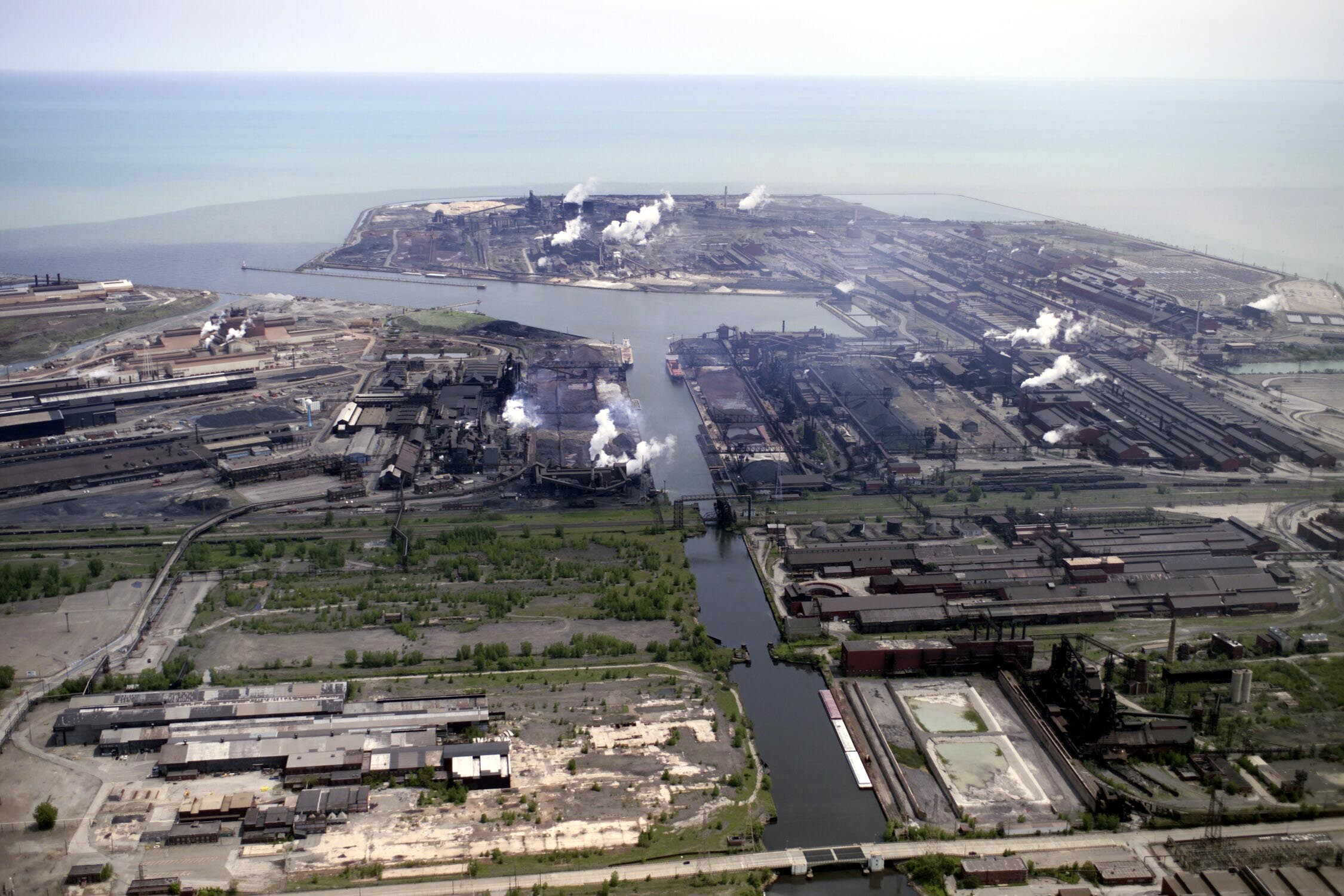
Aerial view of the Indiana Harbor Canal at Lake Michigan

Prior to the industrialization of the Chicago area and the creation of the Chicago Area Waterway System, the Grand Calumet flowed into Lake Michigan at Marquette Park in Miller Beach, near where its headwaters now lie. In this original configuration, the Grand Calumet included much of what is now the Little Calumet River, while the original "Little Calumet" (today the Calumet River) was a minor stream which drained Lake Calumet and Wolf Lake into Lake Michigan. This original river is sometimes called by the older name Konomick or Kennomick to distinguishing it from the Grand Calumet of today; the term comes from the Miami kinwikami, or "long water river".

This arrangement began to shift in the early 19th century, either in 1805 or between 1809 and 1820, when some combination of flooding and human excavation opened up a channel allowing the upper Grand Calumet (now Little Calumet) to drain directly into Lake Calumet. This created the basic definitions of the rivers as they exist today, as what had been the upper reaches of the Grand Calumet now became part of the Little Calumet. The Grand Calumet at this point still flowed from west to east, emptying into the lake at Miller Beach. But by 1872, as more and more of the river's flow was captured by the Calumet River, its original mouth at Miller Beach had been completely blocked by sandbars, totally reversing the flow of the river.

Industrial development on the banks of the Grand Calumet began in the late 19th century, starting with the George Hammond packing company in Hammond. The accumulation of industrial sediment in the river had become problematic by 1885. The construction of the Gary Works in 1905 involved diverting and channelizing a considerable part of the East Branch to make way for the new steel mill. Previously, the Grand Calumet had flowed across a large part of the present-day mill site, and spread to 1,000 feet wide during floods.

In 1906, the Indiana Harbor Canal was completed, again reversing the flow in the eastern portion of the West Branch and creating the approximate flows that exist today, with the East Branch and eastern part of the West Branch emptying into Lake Michigan at Indiana Harbor, while the remainder of the West Branch flows west.

Continuing industrialization along the Grand Calumet led to steadily increasing levels of pollution. By the mid-20th century, the river "had become an industrial sewer, incapable of supporting any life except for blue-green algae and sludgeworms."

== Pollution ==
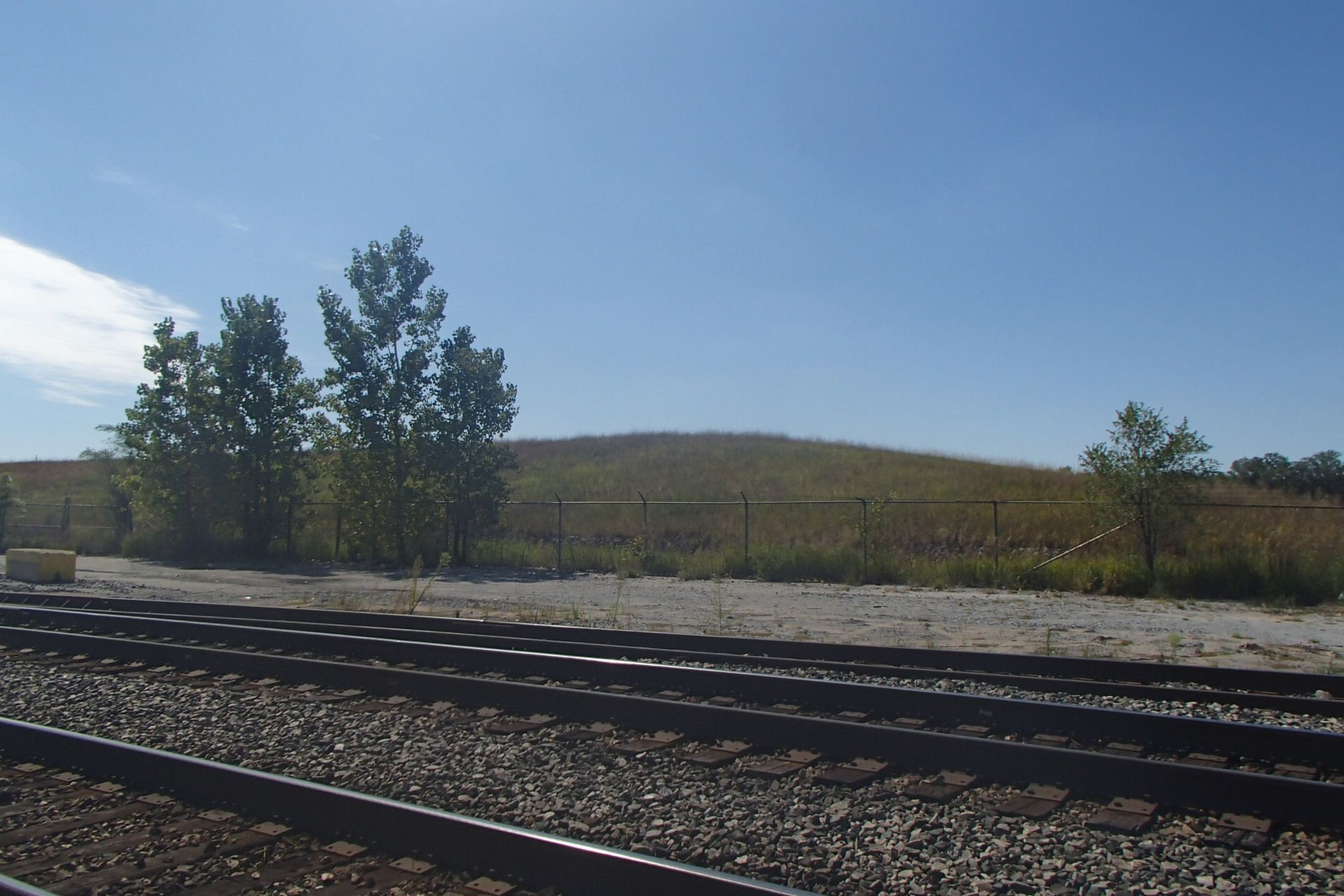
The USS Smelter and Lead Refinery site, one of several Superfund sites along the Grand Calumet.

Approximately 90% of the flow of the Grand Calumet consists of industrial and municipal effluent.

The portion of the Grand Calumet within Indiana has been designated a Great Lakes Areas of Concern (AoC) under the Great Lakes Water Quality Agreement, one of 43 sites favored with such a designation. The Grand Calumet has been listed as one of the 43 AoCs since 1986.

AoCs are designated by having an impairment in at least one of fourteen beneficial uses. The Grand Calumet is the only AoC to be impaired on all fourteen. These impairments include total fish consumption restrictions, beach closings, fish tumors or deformities, animal deformities or reproductive problems, and loss or degradation of fish and wildlife habitat, benthos, phytoplankton, and zooplankton populations, among others.

As of 2015, a major dredging project was under way to remove several hundred thousand tons of toxic sediment from the bottom of the Grand Calumet. The dredging was expected to be complete in 2016.

The largest extent of the river's impairment comes from the historical sediment contamination by the industrial activities already mentioned. Today, sediments on the river bottom are "among the most contaminated and toxic that have ever been reported." Only sludge worms inhabit the Indiana Harbor and Ship Canal, indicating that severe pollution exists. The Grand Calumet suffers from contamination from polychlorinated biphenyls (PCBs), polynuclear aromatic hydrocarbons (PAHs). and heavy metals, such as mercury, cadmium, chromium and lead. Additional problems include high fecal coliform bacteria levels, biochemical oxygen demand (BOD) and suspended solids, oil and grease. These contaminants originate from both point and nonpoint sources.

=== Nonpoint sources ===
- Contaminated sediment: The Grand Calumet River and Indiana Harbor and Canal contain 5 to 10 million cubic yards (3.9 to 7.7 million m^{3}) of contaminated sediment up to 20 feet (6.1 m) deep. Contaminants include toxic compounds (e.g., PAHs, PCBs and heavy metals) and conventional pollutants (e.g., phosphorus, nitrogen, iron, magnesium, volatile solids, oil and grease).
- Industrial waste site runoff: Stormwater runoff and leachate from 11 of 38 waste disposal and storage sites in the AoC, located within 0.2 miles (320 m) of the river, are degrading the water quality. Contaminants include oil, heavy metals, arsenic, PCBs, PAHs and lead.
- Superfund sites: There are 52 sites in the AoC listed in the federal Comprehensive Environmental Response Compensation and Liability Act (CERCLA) System, more commonly known as Superfund. Five of these sites are on the National Priorities List.
- Hazardous waste sites under RCRA: There are 423 hazardous waste sites in the AoC regulated under the Resource Conservation and Recovery Act (RCRA), such as landfills or surface impoundments, where hazardous waste is disposed. Twenty-two of these sites are treatment, storage and disposal facilities.
- Underground storage tanks (USTs): There are more than 460 underground storage tanks in the AoC. More than 150 leaking tank reports have been filed for the Lake County section of the AoC since mid-1987.
- Atmospheric deposition: Atmospheric deposition of toxic substances from fossil fuel burning, waste incineration and evaporation enter the AoC through direct contact with water, surface water runoff and leaching of accumulated materials deposited on land. Toxins from this source include dioxins, PCBs, insecticides and heavy metals.
- Urban runoff: Rain water passing over paved urban areas washes grease, oil and toxic organics such as PCBs and PAHs into the surface waters.
- Contaminated groundwater: Groundwater contaminated with organic compounds, heavy metals and petroleum products contaminates surface waters. The U.S. Environmental Protection Agency estimates that at least 16.8 million US gallons (64,000 m^{3}) of oil float on top of groundwater beneath the AoC.

=== Point sources of contaminants ===
- Industrial and Municipal Wastewater Discharges: Three steel manufacturers contribute 90 percent of industrial point source discharges to river. One chemical manufacturer also discharges into the river. Permitted discharges include arsenic, cadmium, cyanide, copper, chromium, lead and mercury. Three municipal treatment works (Gary, Hammond and East Chicago Sanitary Districts) discharge treated domestic and industrial wastewater.
- Combined Sewer Overflows (CSOs): Fifteen CSOs contribute untreated municipal waste, including conventional and toxic pollutants, to the river. Annually, CSO outfalls discharge an estimated 11 billion US gallons (42,000,000 m^{3}) of raw wastewater into the harbor and river. Approximately 57% of the annual CSO volume is discharged within eight miles (13 km) of Lake Michigan, resulting in nearshore fecal coliform contamination.

== Watershed ==
The total area drained by the Grand Calumet is less than 50 square miles. It is one of the region's smallest watersheds.

=== Flora and fauna ===
Fish populations in most of the Grand Calumet were virtually wiped out in the 20th century, although the headwaters area continues to support sensitive native species including the Iowa darter. The fish community in most of the river today is dominated by exotic and nonindigenous detritivores.

A string of nature preserves operated by The Nature Conservancy, the Shirley Heinze Land Trust and the Lake County Parks Department run along the banks of the lower East Branch in Gary, East Chicago and Hammond. Known as the Tolleston Strand Plain, the preserves are home to the dune and swale habitat, which once covered large areas around the Great Lakes but is now considered globally rare. Dune and swale complexes are known for their high levels of biodiversity. Endangered and threatened species in these nature preserves along the Grand Calumet include the Karner blue butterfly. Other rare species include the Franklin's ground squirrel, Blanding's turtle, the glass lizard and the black-crowned night heron.

== See also ==
- Calumet River
- Calumet Region
- List of rivers of Illinois
- List of rivers of Indiana

== Works cited ==
- Hurley, Andrew (1995). Environmental Inequalities: Class, Race, and Industrial Pollution in Gary, Indiana. Chapel Hill: University of North Carolina Press. ISBN 0807845183 – via Google Books.
- Ingersoll, C.G.; MacDonald, D.D.; Brumbaugh, W.G.; Johnson, B.T.; Kemble, N.E.; Kunz, J.L.; May, T.W.; Wang, N.; Smith, J.R.; Sparks, D.W.; Ireland, D.S. (August 2002). "Toxicity Assessment of Sediments from the Grand Calumet River and Indiana Harbor Canal in Northwestern Indiana, USA". Archives of Environmental Contamination and Toxicology. 43 (2): 156–167. Bibcode:2002ArECT..43..156I. doi:10.1007/s00244-001-0051-0. ISSN 0090-4341. PMID 12115041. S2CID 7482433.
- McCafferty, Michael (2008). Native American Place Names of Indiana. Urbana: University of Illinois Press. ISBN 978-0252032684 – via Google Books.
- Nevers, Meredith Becker; Whitman, Richard L.; Gerovac, Paul J. (1999–2000). "History and Environmental Setting of the Grand Calumet River". Proceedings of the Indiana Academy of Science. 108–109: 3–10. OCLC 500023187. Archived from the original (PDF) on February 2, 2015.
- Putnam, J.W. (1918). The Illinois and Michigan Canal. Chicago: University of Chicago Press – via Archive.org.
- Schoon, Kenneth J. (2003). Calumet Beginnings: Ancient Shorelines and Settlements at the Southern End of Lake Michigan. Bloomington: Indiana University Press. ISBN 025334218X – via Google Books.
- Simon, Thomas P.; Moy, Philip B. (1999–2000). "Past, Present and Potential of Fish Assemblages in the Grand Calumet River and Indiana Harbor Canal Drainage with Emphasis on Recovery of Native Fish Communities" (PDF). Proceedings of the Indiana Academy of Science. 108–109: 83–103. OCLC 500023187.
- Willoughby, Timothy C.; Siddeeq, Qaadir A. (2001). "An Estimate of Chemical Loads From Ground Water to the Grand Calumet River and Indiana Harbor Canal, Northwestern Indiana" (PDF). Indianapolis: United States Geological Survey. OCLC 47015740. Water-Resources Investigations Report 01-4020.
