= Cal-Sag Channel =

Canal in Cook County, Illinois, US

Calumet-Saganashkee Channel
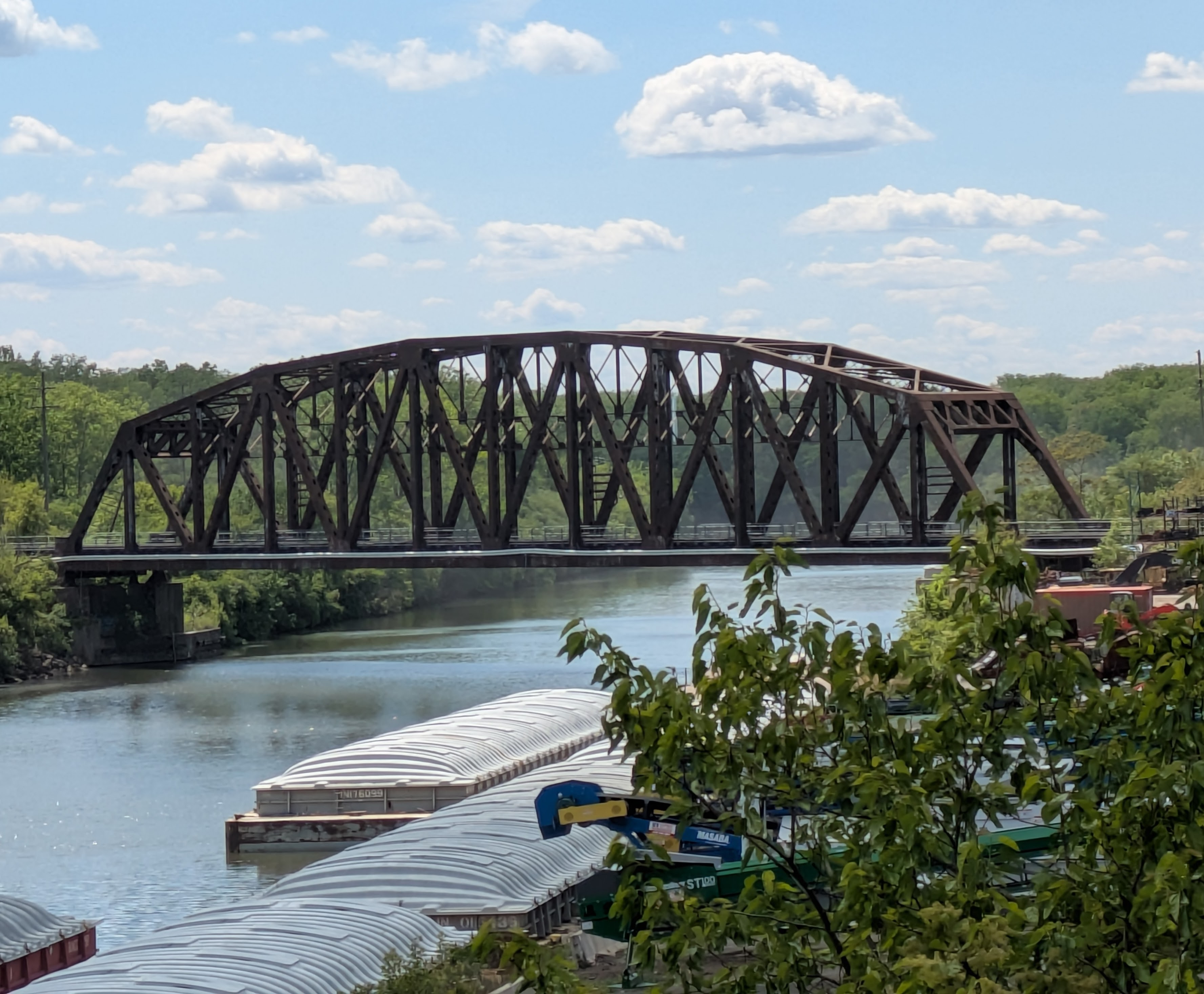
- Joliet Subdivision railroad crossing at Sag Bridge
- Interactive map of Calumet-Saganashkee Channel
- Location: Cook County, Illinois
- Country: United States
- Coordinates: 41°41′6″N 87°50′49″W

Specifications
- Length: 16 miles (26 km)
- Locks: None
- Status: Open

History
- Construction began: 1911
- Date completed: 1922

Geography
- Start point: Chicago Sanitary and Ship Canal
- End point: Little Calumet River

The Calumet-Saganashkee Channel, usually shortened to the Cal-Sag Channel, is a 16-mile-long (26 km) drainage and shipping canal in southern Cook County, Illinois, operated by the Metropolitan Water Reclamation District of Greater Chicago (MWRD). A component of the Chicago Area Waterway System, it connects the Little Calumet River at its eastern end to the Chicago Sanitary and Ship Canal at its western end.

The Cal-Sag Channel is utilized for inland shipping, recreational boating and drainage purposes in what was an active zone of heavy industry in the Far Southeast Side neighborhoods of the city of Chicago and adjacent suburbs. As a drainage channel, it is used as a conduit for treated effluent wastewater from southern Cook County, including the Chicago-area Deep Tunnel Project, into the Illinois Waterway. It is also used in the summertime by pleasure craft.

== Route ==
The canal runs westward through Calumet, Worth, Palos and Lemont Townships before joining the Chicago Sanitary and Ship Canal at the border of DuPage County. After passing through central Blue Island, the channel constitutes the principal boundary between the suburbs of Alsip, Worth and Palos Hills on its north, and Robbins, Crestwood, Palos Heights and Palos Park on its south. The final 4.5 miles (7.2 km) of the channel flows through the Palos Forest Preserves, a large parkland area operated by the Forest Preserve District of Cook County.

When it is completed, the Calumet-Sag Trail, a 26-mile-long (42 km) greenway, will border the channel and will stretch from the Chicago Sanitary and Ship Canal to the Burnham Greenway.

== History ==
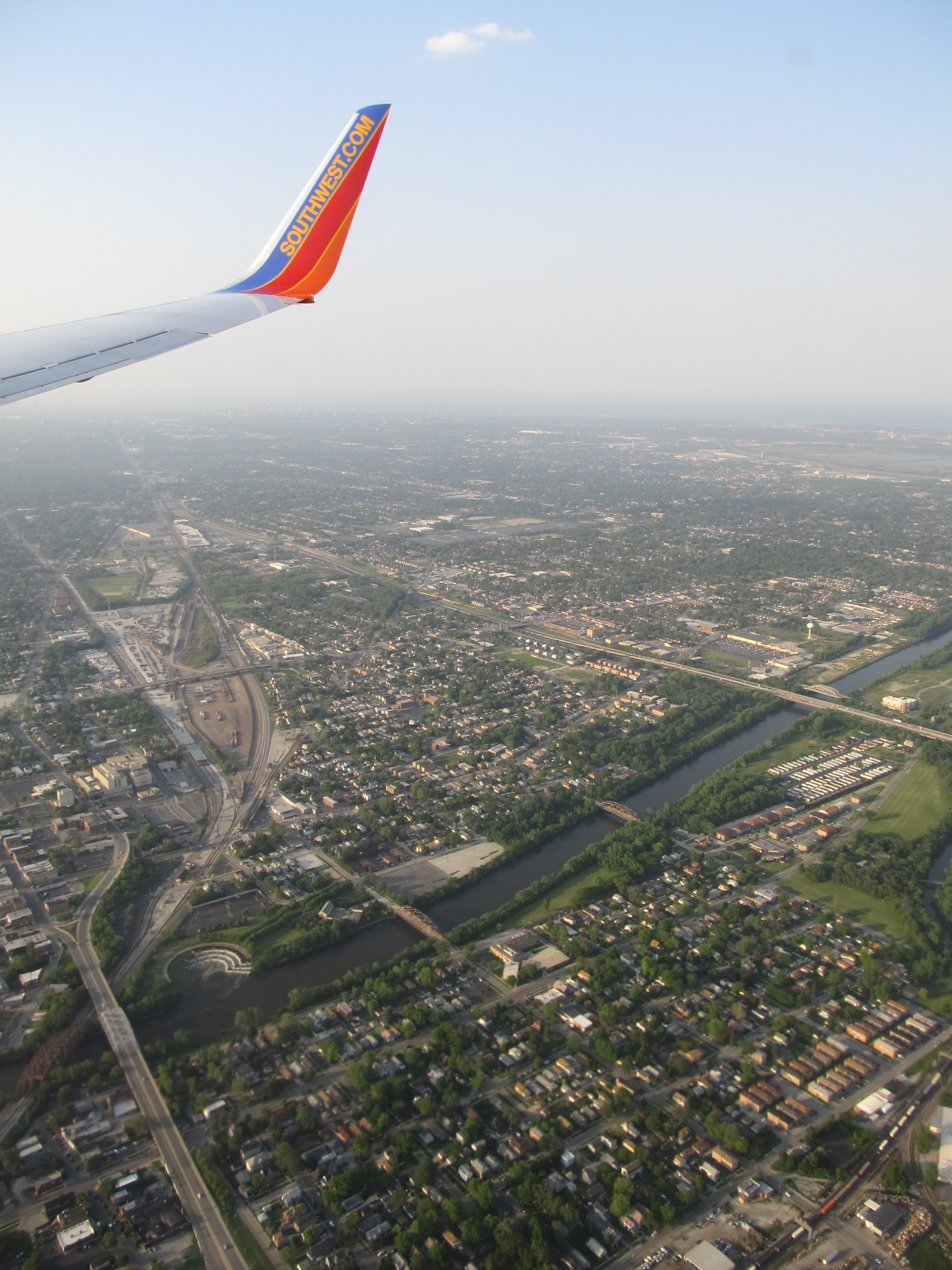
The channel at Blue Island, looking northeast

Constructed between 1911 and 1922, the canal was dug to reverse the flow of the Little Calumet River for the purpose of draining untreated sewage discharged into the river away from Lake Michigan and into the Chicago Sanitary and Ship Canal. The canal was initially constructed to a width of 60 feet (18 m), with its eastern end guarded by the Blue Island Lock and controlling work. The lock measured 350 feet (110 m) by 50 feet (15 m) and facilitated very limited inland shipping operations.

With the development of the Illinois Waterway to provide for a standardized inland shipping connection between Calumet Region and the Mississippi River, 160 feet (49 m) passing sidings were built along the canal every three miles in 1936. However, the primary purpose of the Cal-Sag remained to drain sewage and stormwater away from the lake.

The channel was once again widened and improved by the Army Corps of Engineers (USACE) between 1955 and 1965 to its current 225 feet (69 m) to allow use by increasingly large barges. In 1965, the Blue Island Lock and controlling works were decommissioned and demolished after the T.J. O'Brien Lock and Dam was completed upstream.

The Cal-Sag Channel served as the rowing venue for the 1959 Pan American Games.
