= Canal Shores Golf Course =

American golf course in Illinois

Coordinates: 42.0626°N 87.6869°W

Canal Shores Golf Course (formerly known as the Peter N. Jans Memorial Golf Course and the Evanston Wilmette Community Golf Course) is an 82-acre, 18-hole, par 60 golf course located in a suburban residential neighborhood on the east side of Evanston, Illinois, and Wilmette, Illinois. Founded in 1919 on the banks of the North Shore Channel of the Chicago River, the course is 3,904 yards in length, featuring a narrow and tree-lined fairway and two over-the-water holes. Eleven of the holes are located in Evanston, Illinois, and seven holes are in Wilmette, Illinois.

== History ==
Peter N. Jans, a golf professional and Evanston civic leader, championed the reclamation of the undeveloped canal banks for a golf course in north Evanston. Todd Sloan, who also laid out the back nine of the Racine Country Club in Wisconsin, is credited as the architect of the present-day Canal Shores Golf Course, which has been renamed several times during the past century. The course was built on the site of the previous location of the Evanston Golf Club, which relocated due to the construction of the North Shore Channel drainage project. The course is built substantially on public property and is managed and funded by the Evanston Wilmette Golf Course Association, a volunteer organization composed of golfers and neighbors in the City of Evanston and Village of Wilmette.

In August 2014 Joel Murray hosted the Tour of Duty Golf Classic at Canal Shores, a benefit to assist first responders.

== North Shore Open ==
Canal Shores Golf Course, together with Skokie Sports Park, has played host to the annual North Shore Open golf tournament since 2015. The event was founded by Evanston resident Orin Brown, and the winner receives a ceremonial picture taken while sitting in a tire. Dan Skowronski and Ty Hayes hold the record for the lowest score with a 133. The North Shore Channel plays a role on most of Canal Shores' 18-hole layout and the channel runs just east of Skokie Sports Park.

Year	Champion	Runner-up
2015 North Shore Open	Dan Skowronski	Bennet "HD" Hayes
2016 North Shore Open	Bennet "HD" Hayes	Peter Mullen
2017 North Shore Open	NA (Open was not held)	NA (Open was not held)
2018 North Shore Open	Dan Skowronski	Peter Mullen
2019 North Shore Open	Peter Mullen	Dan Skowronski
2020 North Shore Open	Bennet "HD" Hayes	Dan Skowronski
2021 North Shore Open	Dan Skowronski	Bennet "HD" Hayes
2022 North Shore Open	Bennet "HD" Hayes	Shaun Currie
2023 North Shore Open*	Bennet "HD" Hayes	Peter Mullen
2024 North Shore Open*	Bennet Hayes	Shaun Currie
2025 North Shore Open	Dan Skowronski	Ty Hayes
2026 North Shore Open	Bennet "HD" Hayes	Ty Hayes

*2023 and 2024 events were conducted in Des Plaines, Illinois, due to extenuating circumstances
