= 312 RiverRun =

Public park in Chicago, Illinois

Coordinates: 41.949012°N 87.696503°W

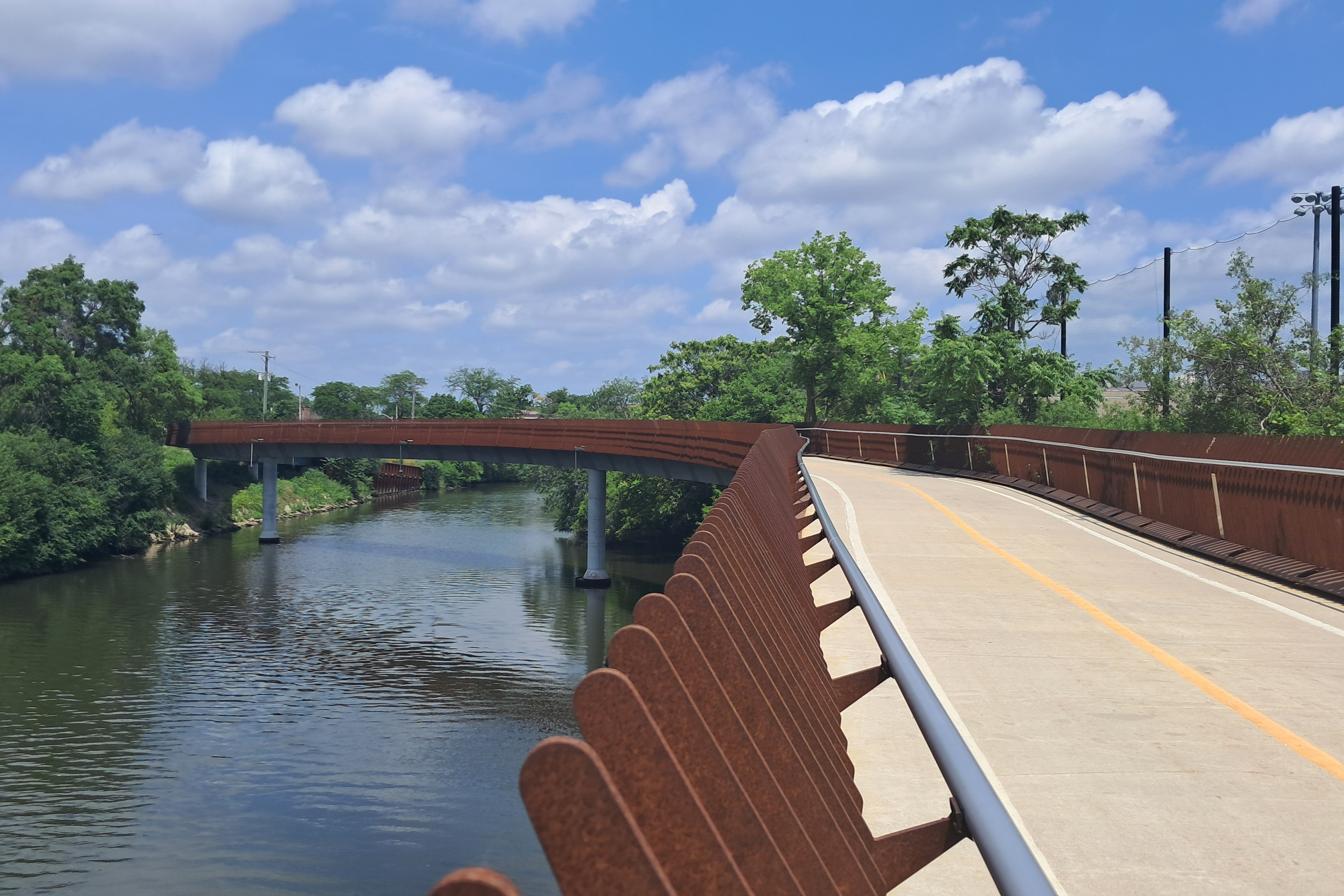
- 312 RiverRun at the Riverview Bridge
- Length: 2 miles (3.2 km)
- Location: Chicago, Illinois, US
- Established: 2020; 6 years ago
- Trailheads: Irving Park Road; Belmont Avenue
- Use: Cycling, skateboarding, scootering, personal transporter, and pedestrians
- Difficulty: Easy
- Season: Limited access during winter

312 RiverRun is a public hiking area along the Chicago River in Chicago, Illinois, United States. The development is a further move toward Chicago's goal of having a continuous pedestrian path along the entire riverfront.

It connects three parks with one two-mile-long bike and pedestrian path. The park project receives funding from organizations including the Federal Highway Administration, the Illinois Department of Transportation, and the Chicago Metropolitan Agency for Planning.

The first phase of the project connected Richard Clark Park to California Park via the Riverview Bridge, crossing from the east bank to the west bank of the Chicago River creating a continuous path between Belmont Avenue and Irving Park Road. The Riverview Bridge opened in late November 2019. The project concluded in fall 2021 after Irving Park Road bridge was replaced. The completion of the 312 RiverRun provides a continuous trail from Belmont Avenue to Montrose Avenue via Horner Park.

In September 2021, Mayor Lori Lightfoot and alderman Matt Martin attended a ribbon-cutting ceremony to celebrate the completion of the Irving Park Road bridge trail.
