= Chicago Sanitary and Ship Canal =

Canal system in northeast Illinois

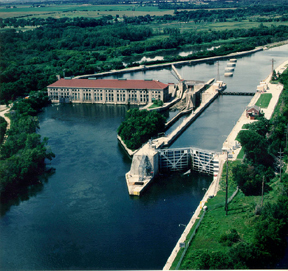
- Lock and dam of the Chicago Sanitary and Ship Canal at Lockport
- CSSC highlighted in blue

Specifications
- Length: 28 miles (45 km)
- Locks: 1
- Status: Open

History
- Former names: Chicago Drainage Canal
- Date completed: January 2, 1900; 126 years ago
- Date extended: 1907

Geography
- Start point: Des Plaines River north of Joliet, Illinois (41.5552°N 88.0778°W)
- End point: South Branch Chicago River in Chicago, Illinois (41.8416°N 87.6757°W)
- Chicago Sanitary and Ship Canal Historic District
- U.S. National Register of Historic Places
- U.S. Historic district
- Location within Illinois
- Nearest city: Chicago, Illinois
- Area: 1,128.4 acres (456.6 ha)
- Built: 1892
- Built by: Randolph, Isham; Wisner, G.M.
- MPS: Illinois Waterway Navigation System Facilities MPS
- NRHP reference No.: 11000907
- Added to NRHP: December 20, 2011

The Chicago Sanitary and Ship Canal, historically known as the Chicago Drainage Canal, is a 32-mile-long (51 km) canal system that connects the Chicago River to the Des Plaines River in Northeast Illinois, US. It reverses the direction of the Main Stem and the South Branch of the Chicago River, which now flows out of Lake Michigan rather than into it. The related Calumet-Sag Channel does the same for the Calumet River, 10 miles to the south, joining the Chicago canal about halfway along its route to the Des Plaines River.

The canal was built to solve a public health problem. Prior to its opening in 1900, sewage from the city of Chicago was discharged into the Chicago River and flowed into Lake Michigan. The city's drinking water supply was (and remains) located offshore, and there were fears that the sewage could reach the intake and cause serious disease outbreaks. Since the sewer systems were already flowing into the river, the decision was made to reverse the flow of the river, thereby sending all the sewage inland diluted with lake water, allowing flowing water to assimilate the waste load as it flowed through the canal, Des Plaines River and Illinois River.

The building of the Chicago canal served as intensive and practical training for engineers who later built the Panama Canal. The canal is operated by the Metropolitan Water Reclamation District of Greater Chicago. In 1999, the system was named a Civil Engineering Monument of the Millennium by the American Society of Civil Engineers (ASCE). The Canal was listed on the National Register of Historic Places on December 20, 2011.

== Reasons for construction ==
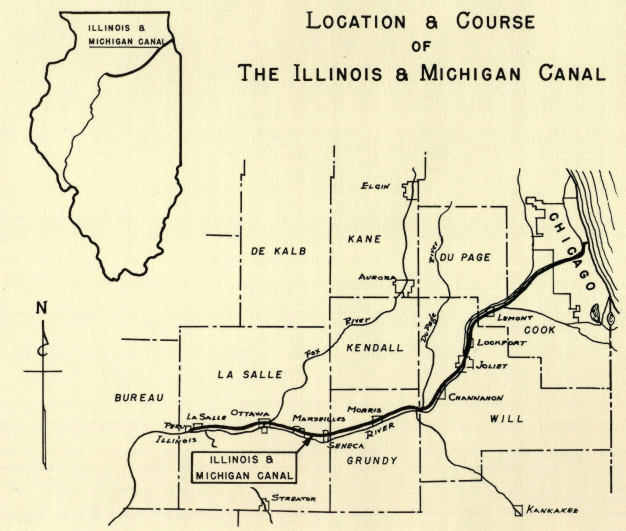
The location and course of the old Illinois and Michigan Canal, which the Sanitary and Ship Canal largely replaced

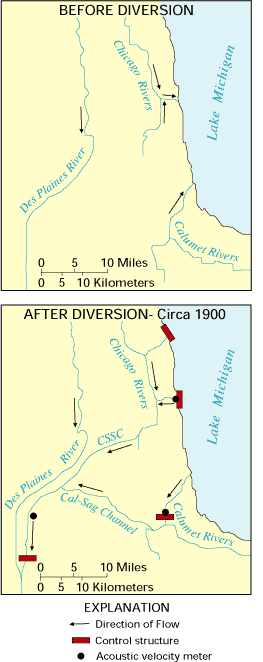
The flow of water before and after the construction of the Sanitary and Ship Canal. Note that the before image here does not include the layout of the transcontinental divide Illinois and Michigan Canal (built 1848) which existed at the time (1900) but did not generally affect the directional flow of the waters

Early Chicago sewage systems discharged directly into Lake Michigan or into the Chicago River, which itself flowed into the lake. The city's water supply also comes from the lake, through water intake cribs located two miles (3.2 km) offshore. There were fears that sewage could infiltrate the water supply, leading to typhoid fever, cholera, and dysentery. In 1871 the Illinois and Michigan Canal (built 1848) had been deepened in an attempt to reverse the river and improve shipping but the reversal of the river only lasted one season. During a tremendous storm in 1885, the rainfall washed refuse from the river far out into the lake (although reports of an 1885 cholera epidemic are untrue), spurring a panic that a future similar storm would cause a huge epidemic in Chicago. The only reason for the storm not causing such a catastrophic event was that the weather was cooler than normal. The Sanitary District of Chicago (now The Metropolitan Water Reclamation District) was created by the Illinois legislature in 1889 in response to this close call.

== Planning and construction, 1887–1922 ==
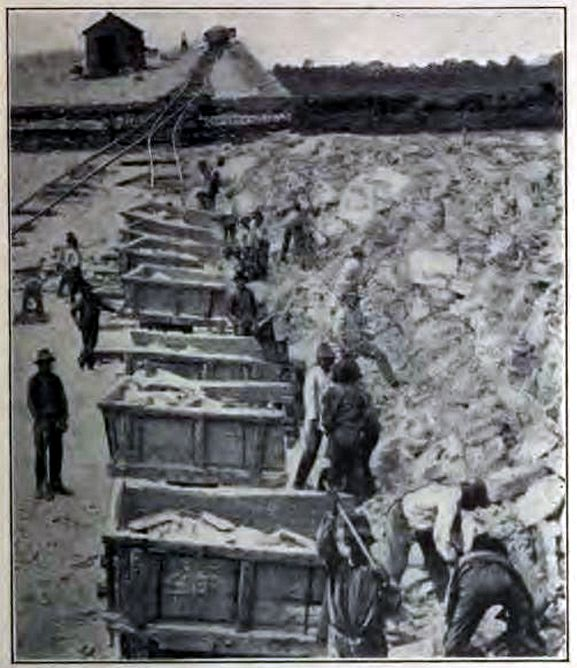
Construction of the Chicago Drainage Canal, 1900s

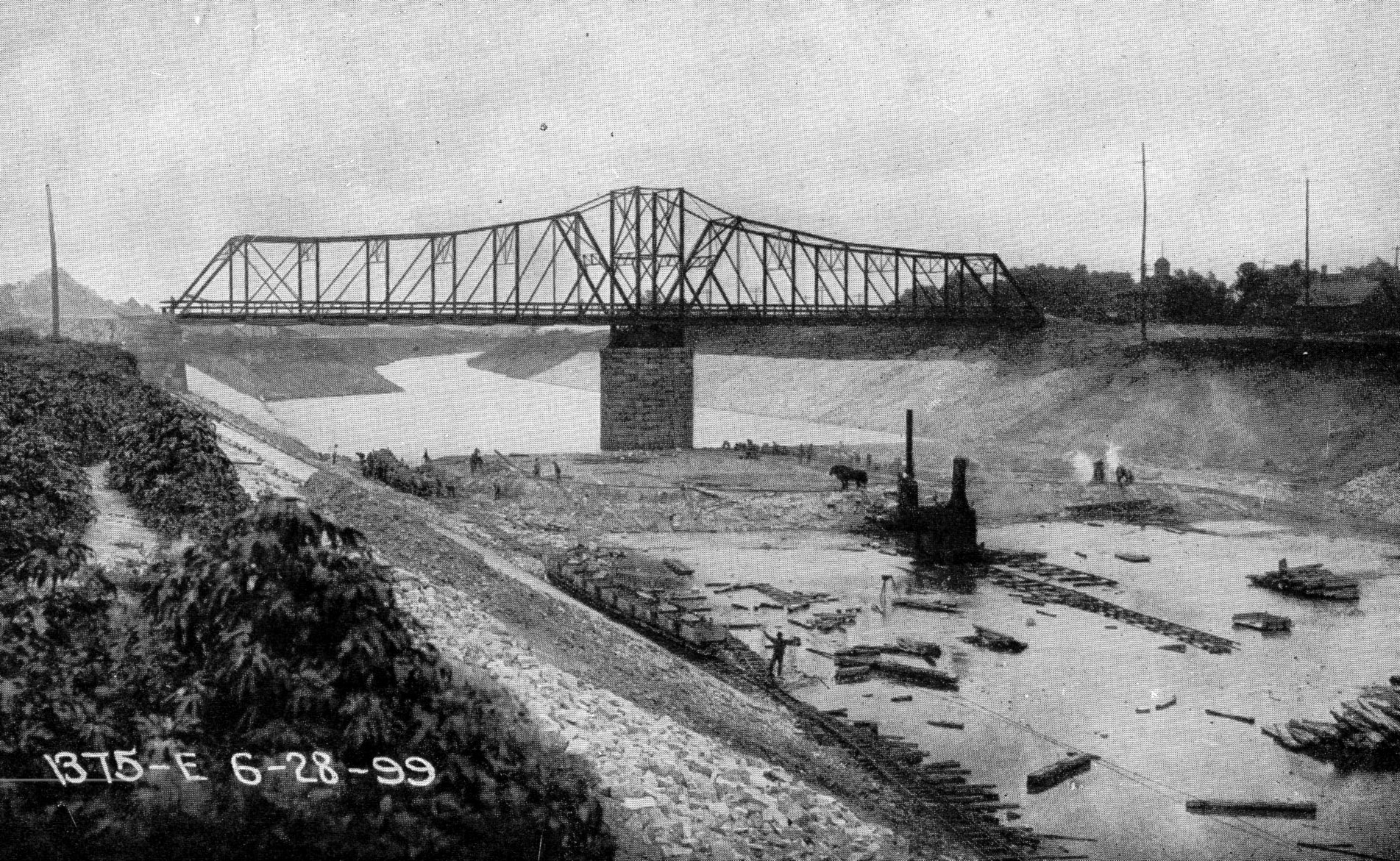
Chicago Drainage Canal being built (1899)

By 1887, it was decided to reverse the flow of the Chicago River through civil engineering. Engineer Isham Randolph noted that a ridge about 12 miles (19 km) from the lakeshore divided the Mississippi River drainage system from the Great Lakes drainage system. This low divide had been known since pre-Columbian time by the Native Americans, who used it as the Chicago Portage to cross from the Chicago River drainage to the Des Plaines River basin drainage. The Illinois and Michigan Canal was cut across that divide in the 1840s. In an attempt to better drain sewage and pollution in the Chicago River, the flow of the river had already been reversed in 1871 when the Illinois and Michigan Canal was deepened enough to reverse the river's flow for one season. A plan soon emerged to again cut through the ridge and reverse the flow permanently carrying wastewater away from the lake, through the Des Plaines and Illinois rivers, to the Mississippi River and the Gulf of Mexico. In 1889, the Illinois General Assembly created the Sanitary District of Chicago (SDC) to carry out the plan. After four years of turmoil during construction, Isham Randolph was appointed Chief Engineer for the newly formed Sanitary District of Chicago and resolved many issues circulating around the project.

One of the issues for Randolph to resolve was a strike of about 2000 union workers, centered in Lemont and Joliet. On June 1, 1893, quarrymen went out to protest a wage cut, an action that also drew in 1200 canal workers. Reports describe 400 quarrymen marching along the length of the canal project on June 2, between Lemont and Romeo, conducting a "reign of terror" at worksites, "armed with clubs and revolvers", "almost crazed with liquor". On the 9th strikers clashed with replacement workers and local law enforcement, and Governor Altgeld called out the First and Second Regiments of the Illinois National Guard. Dozens were wounded and at least five killed: strikers Gregor Kilka, Jacob (or Ignatz) Ast, Thomas Moorski, Mike Berger, and 17-year-old bystander John Kluga. The strike was settled by the 15th.

The new Chicago Sanitary and Ship Canal, linking the south branch of the Chicago River to the Des Plaines River at Lockport, and in advance of an application by the Missouri Attorney General for an injunction against the opening, opened on January 2, 1900. However, it was not until January 17 that the complete flow of the water was released. Further construction from 1903 to 1907 extended the canal to Joliet, as the SDC wanted to replace the previously built Illinois and Michigan Canal with the Chicago Sanitary and Ship Canal. The rate of flow is controlled by the Lockport Powerhouse, sluice gates at Chicago Harbor and at the O'Brien Lock in the Calumet River, and also by pumps at Wilmette Harbor. Two more canals were later built to add to the system: the North Shore Channel in 1910, and the Calumet-Saganashkee Channel in 1922.

Construction of the Ship and Sanitary Canal was the largest earth-moving operation that had been undertaken in North America up to that time. It was also notable for training a generation of engineers, many of whom later worked on the Panama Canal. In 1989, the Sanitary District of Chicago was renamed the Metropolitan Water Reclamation District of Greater Chicago.

== Diversion of water from the Great Lakes ==
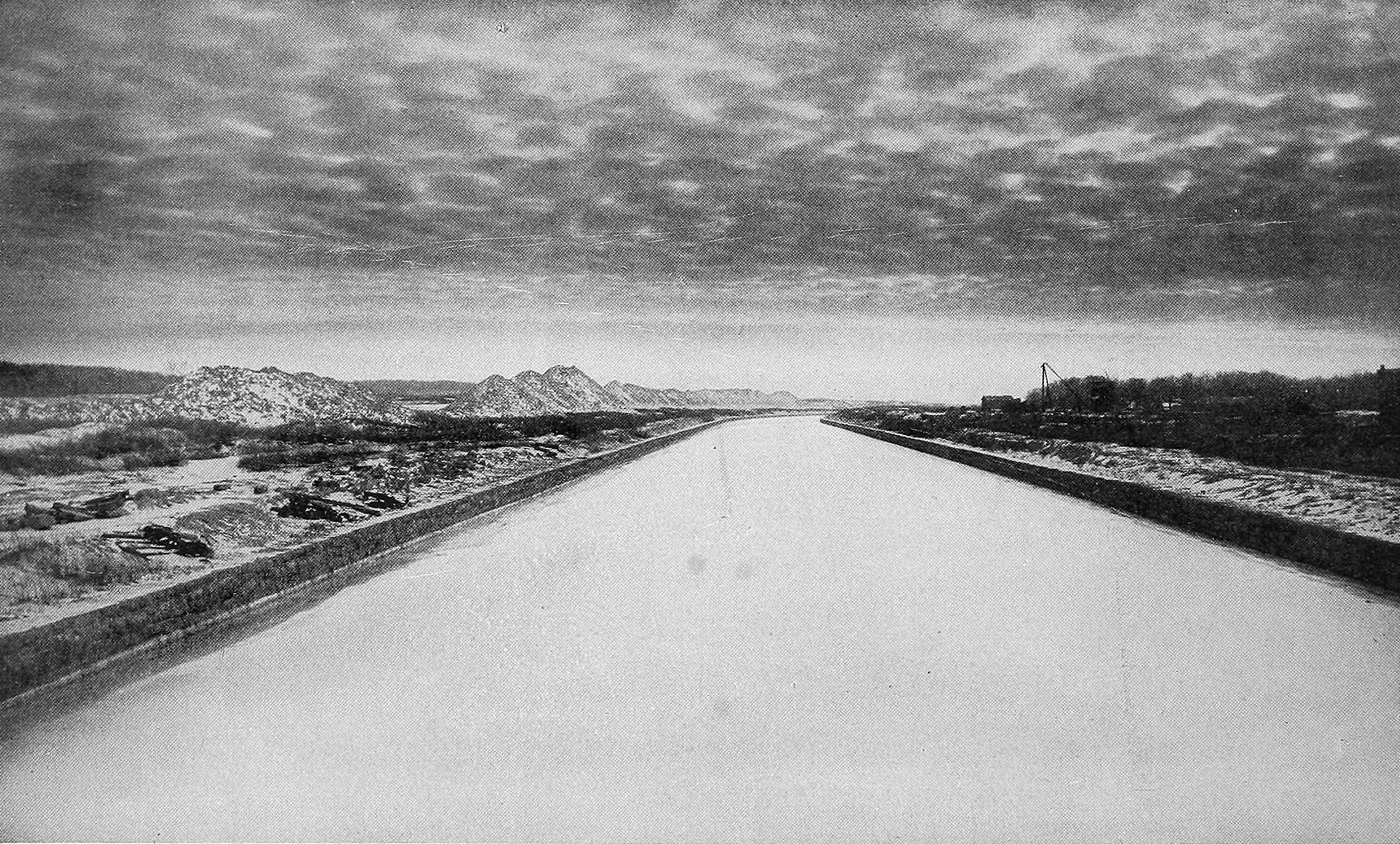
The canal at Willow Springs, Illinois, 1904

The Chicago Sanitary and Ship Canal is designed to work by taking water from Lake Michigan and discharging it into the Mississippi River watershed. At the time of construction, a specific amount of water diversion was authorized by the United States Army Corps of Engineers (USACE) and approved by the Secretary of War, under provisions of various Rivers and Harbors Acts; over the years however, this limit was not honored or well regulated. While the increased flow more rapidly flushed the untreated sewage, it also was seen as a hazard to navigation, a concern to USACE in relation to the level of the Great Lakes and the St. Lawrence River, from which the water was diverted. Litigation ensued from 1907, which eventually saw states downstream of the canal siding with the sanitary district and those states upstream of Lake Michigan with Canada siding against the district. The litigation was eventually decided by the Supreme Court in Sanitary District of Chicago v. United States in 1925, and again in Wisconsin v. Illinois in 1929. In 1930, management of the canal was turned over to the United States Army Corps of Engineers. The Corps of Engineers reduced the flow of water from Lake Michigan into the canal, but kept it open for navigation purposes. Today, diversions from the Great Lakes system are regulated by an international treaty with Canada, through the International Joint Commission, and by governors of the Great Lakes states.

== Wastewater ==
Most local sewers in the Chicago area were built over 100 years ago, before wastewater treatment existed. They were designed to drain sanitary flow and a limited amount of stormwater directly into the river. If intercepting sewers and the Metropolitan Water Reclamation District of Greater Chicago (MWRD) water reclamation plants reach capacity during heavy rain, the local sewer continues to drain, or “overflow,” to a waterway, thus causing concern for pollution. The MWRD's Tunnel and Reservoir Plan (TARP) has worked to decrease the combined sewage overflow (CSOs) and nearly eliminated them in the Calumet Area River System. Since operationalizing the tunnels in 2006, combined sewage overflow events have been reduced from an average of 100 days per year to 50. Since 2015, when Thornton Reservoir came online, MWRD claims that overflow events have been "nearly eliminated." TARP captures and stores combined stormwater and sewage that would otherwise overflow from sewers into waterways in rainy weather. This stored water is pumped from TARP to water reclamation plants to be cleaned before being released to waterways. MWRD claims that the improved water quality has led to increasingly diverse and healthy populations of fish.

== Navigation ==
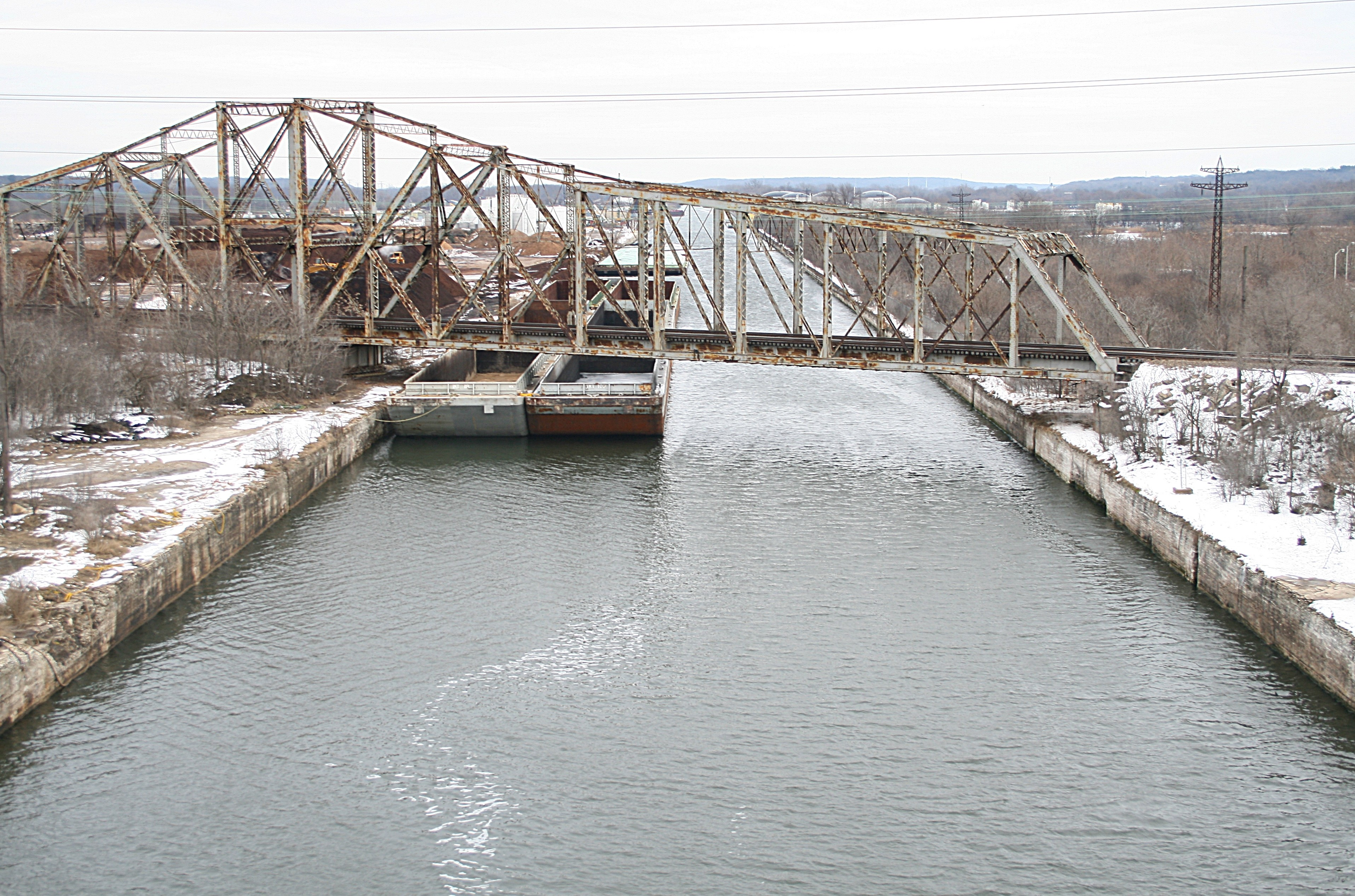
BNSF Railway bridge in Lemont Clearance: 19.7 by 180 feet (6.0 by 54.9 m)

Navigation on the canal has always been limited, as the Chicago Sanitary District was organized only to build a sanitary canal. Many people downstream of Lockport wanted the canal navigable to the Chicago River, and if it wasn't, they didn't want any state funds used. Chicago was opposed to navigation, as the city was flat, and navigation would mean that the bridges would have to open for overhead clearance. With all of Chicago's railroads opening, the bridges would seriously impair traffic.

In 1899 the older Illinois and Michigan Canal had little traffic between Chicago and Lockport, but its 1822 charter said it must remain a public waterway and the Sanitary District could not obstruct it. After years of negotiations the two canals made an agreement in December 1899: The Sanitary District would pump water into the I&M canal, which would be at a higher elevation, until they could connect with it farther downstream. Between 1907 and 1910 the Sanitary District lengthened the canal for an hydro-electric plant and a lock down to the southern portion of the I&M Canal.

There were various plans to create the "Illinois Waterway" by improving the Illinois and Des Plaines Rivers. In 1933 the federal government completed the Waterway and the Sanitary district opened a new larger lock leading down to it. Even then only the southern two bridges, 135th St./Romeo Rd. and 9th St. Lockport, ever opened for river traffic regularly. No bridge north of Romeo ever had permanent operating machinery, and they were only opened for special moves. River sized barge tows could enter the canal but only go upstream to Lemont, where they need to be separated into smaller tows for the restricted canal. With the bridges closed the vertical clearances are less than twenty feet (6 meters) and only special towboats with low pilot houses can be used.

In 1941 the US government made plans to build ocean-going ships on the Great Lakes and then move them down the Mississippi River to avoid any German submarines along the east coast. All bridges had temporary machinery installed and the new Western Ave. bridge, which had just been opened as fixed by the City of Chicago, was converted to a lift bridge at their cost.

During World War II more than 1,200 ships were built on the Great Lakes and went through Chicago. Most were harbor or coastal types, such as tugs, service craft, and small patrol vessels, but larger ships went through too, including 28 submarines, 26 destroyer escorts, and 19 frigates.. Small cargo ships and tankers were also built.

Larger ships had problems with a thirty-nine foot (12 meters) vertical clearance on two highway bridges and the shallow Illinois Waterway, which was only nine feet (2.74 meters) deep. The destroyer escorts and frigates couldn't have their masts installed and needed to be ballasted to get under the two bridges. Then when they reached the shallower Illinois Waterway they had their propellers removed and pontoons attached to increase their buoyancy and reduce their draft. Submarines used a floating drydock.

Between 1951 and 1957 seven World War II surplus ships were converted into lake freighters and brought north through the canal into the Great Lakes. One unconverted surplus ship and three new-built freighters also came through. In 1953 the 634 foot (193 meters) long Marine Angel became the largest vessel to use the canal. In 1956 the new destroyer escorts Courtney and Lester went through southbound. With the opening of the St. Lawrence Seaway in 1959 there was no longer a need to bring over-sized vessels through Chicago. In 2013 the lowest fixed bridge clearance was 19.5-foot (5.9 m) and the lowest closed is 17.6-foot (5.4 m).

== Asian carp and proposed closure ==
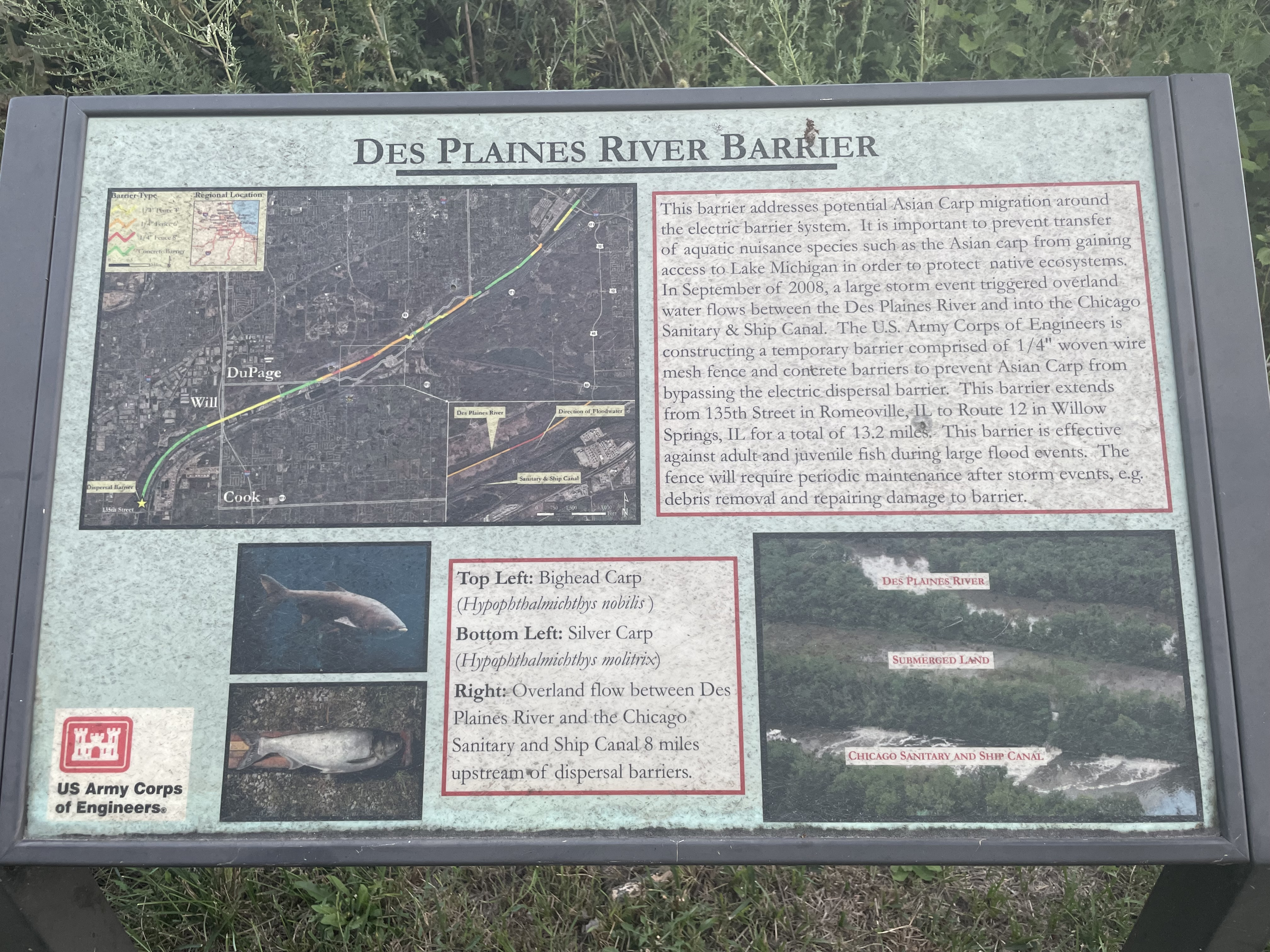
Infographic explaining the electric barrier system designed to prevent Asian Carp from reaching Lake Michigan

On November 20, 2009, the Corps of Engineers announced a single sample of DNA from Asian carp had been found above the electric barrier constructed in the canal in an attempt to prevent carp from migrating into the Great Lakes. The silver carp, also known as the flying carp, displace native species of fish by filter feeding and removing the bottom of the food chain. It migrated through the Mississippi River system, and could make its way into the Great Lakes, through the man-made canal. Carp were introduced to the U.S. with the blessing of the Environmental Protection Agency (EPA) in the 1970s to help remove algae from catfish farms in Arkansas. They escaped the farms.

On December 2, 2009, the Chicago Sanitary and Ship Canal closed, as the EPA and the Illinois Department of Natural Resources (IDNR) began applying a fish poison, rotenone, in an effort to kill Asian carp north of Lockport. Although no Asian carp were found in the two months of commercial and electrofishing, the massive fish kill did yield a single carp.

On December 21, 2009, Michigan Attorney General Mike Cox filed a lawsuit with the Supreme Court seeking the immediate closure of the Chicago Sanitary and Ship Canal to keep Asian carp out of Lake Michigan. The state of Illinois and the Corps of Engineers, which constructed the Canal, are co-defendants in the lawsuit.

In response to the Michigan lawsuit, on January 5, 2010, Illinois State Attorney General Lisa Madigan filed a counter-suit with the Supreme Court requesting that it reject Michigan's claims. Siding with the State of Illinois, both the Illinois Chamber of Commerce and the American Waterways Operators have filed affidavits, arguing that closing the Chicago Sanitary and Ship Canal would upset the movement of millions of tons of vital shipments of iron ore, coal, grain and other cargo, totaling more than $1.5 billion a year, and contribute to the loss of hundreds, perhaps thousands of jobs. However, Michigan along with several other Great Lakes states argue that the sport and commercial fishery and tourism associated with the fishery of the entire Great Lakes region is estimated at $7 billion a year, and impacts the economies of all Great Lakes states and Canada.

On January 19, 2010, the U.S. Supreme Court rejected the request for a preliminary injunction closing the canal. In August 2011, the United States Court of Appeals also rejected the preliminary injunction.

== Renaming ==
A coalition of local groups in 2025 suggested that the canal could have a name that represents the current and future uses rather than the past. They are gathering suggestions with the intent of submitting them to the U.S. Board on Geographic Names.

== See also ==
- Chicago flood – Accidental disaster in 1992
- History of public health in Chicago
