= Calumet River =

System of rivers and canals in Illinois and Indiana, United States

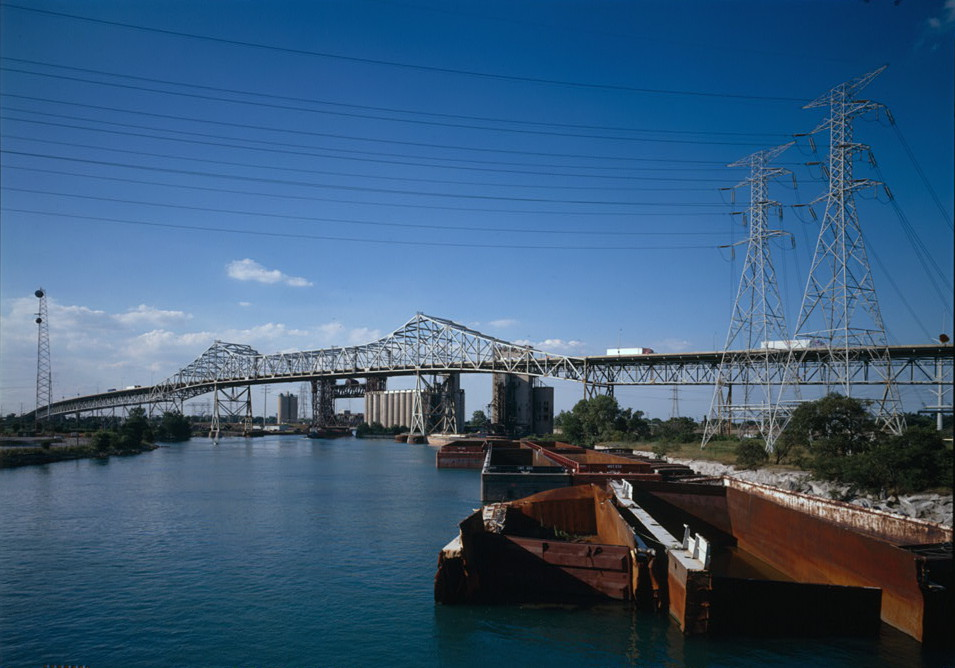
- The Calumet River, with the Chicago Skyway traversing it

Physical characteristics
- Source
  - location: Confluence of the Little Calumet and the Grand Calumet, Chicago
  - coordinates: 41°38′38″N 87°33′39″W
  - elevation: 581 ft (177 m)
- Mouth
  - location: Confluence with Lake Michigan, Chicago
  - coordinates: 41°43′58″N 87°31′46″W
  - elevation: 574 ft (175 m)

Basin features
- Progression: Calumet River → Lake Michigan → Great Lakes → Saint Lawrence Seaway → Gulf of Saint Lawrence
- GNIS ID: 405379

The Calumet River is a system of rivers and canals in the region between the south side of Chicago, Illinois, and the city of Gary, Indiana. Currently, the system is part of the Chicago Area Waterway System.

Historically, the Little Calumet River flowed in a broad westward arc roughly parallel to the Lake Michigan shore, then turned back east and became the Grand Calumet River, which emptied into Lake Michigan at Marquette Park in Gary. The Calumet River was a separate short stream draining Lake Calumet to Lake Michigan.

In modern times, different parts of the watershed now drain into Lake Michigan via the Indiana Harbor and Ship Canal and Burns Ditch, and into the Mississippi River watershed via the Cal-Sag Channel. The "main" Calumet River now connects to the junction of the Little and Grand Calumet Rivers, but flow is heavily restricted by the T.J. O'Brien Lock and Dam.

== Background ==
The name "Calumet" is from the French colonial name for a particular type of Native American ceremonial pipe that served as a universal sign of peace among the Illiniwek, and which was presented to Pere Marquette in 1673.

Before human alteration, water flowed westward from LaPorte County, Indiana, along the Little Calumet River, made a hairpin turn at Blue Island, and flowed east along the Grand Calumet into Lake Michigan at the Miller Beach community of Gary, Indiana. The area is extremely flat and the course and even the direction of the river system has changed repeatedly. The low gradient gives the river only a very small current.

Industrial development in the Calumet River area began around the 1870s, and by 1890 the western reach of the Grand Calumet River was heavily polluted with the waste of steel mills, foundries, a meat packing plant, and glue and cornstarch factories. Industry continued to spread along the eastern reach of the river between 1890 and 1910, with similar results. These decades of unrestricted pollution have left the river sediments highly contaminated to this day.

In September 2008, areas of Lake and Porter County, Indiana, were declared national disaster areas. The Little Calumet River breached its levee and flooded portions of the towns of Munster and Highland, Indiana. In September 2019, Luxembourg-based ArcelorMittal notified Indiana officials of a toxic spill from its Burns Harbor steel mill had spilled into a branch of the Little Calumet River, resulting in short-term closures of three Lake Michigan beaches.

== Segments of the Calumet River system ==
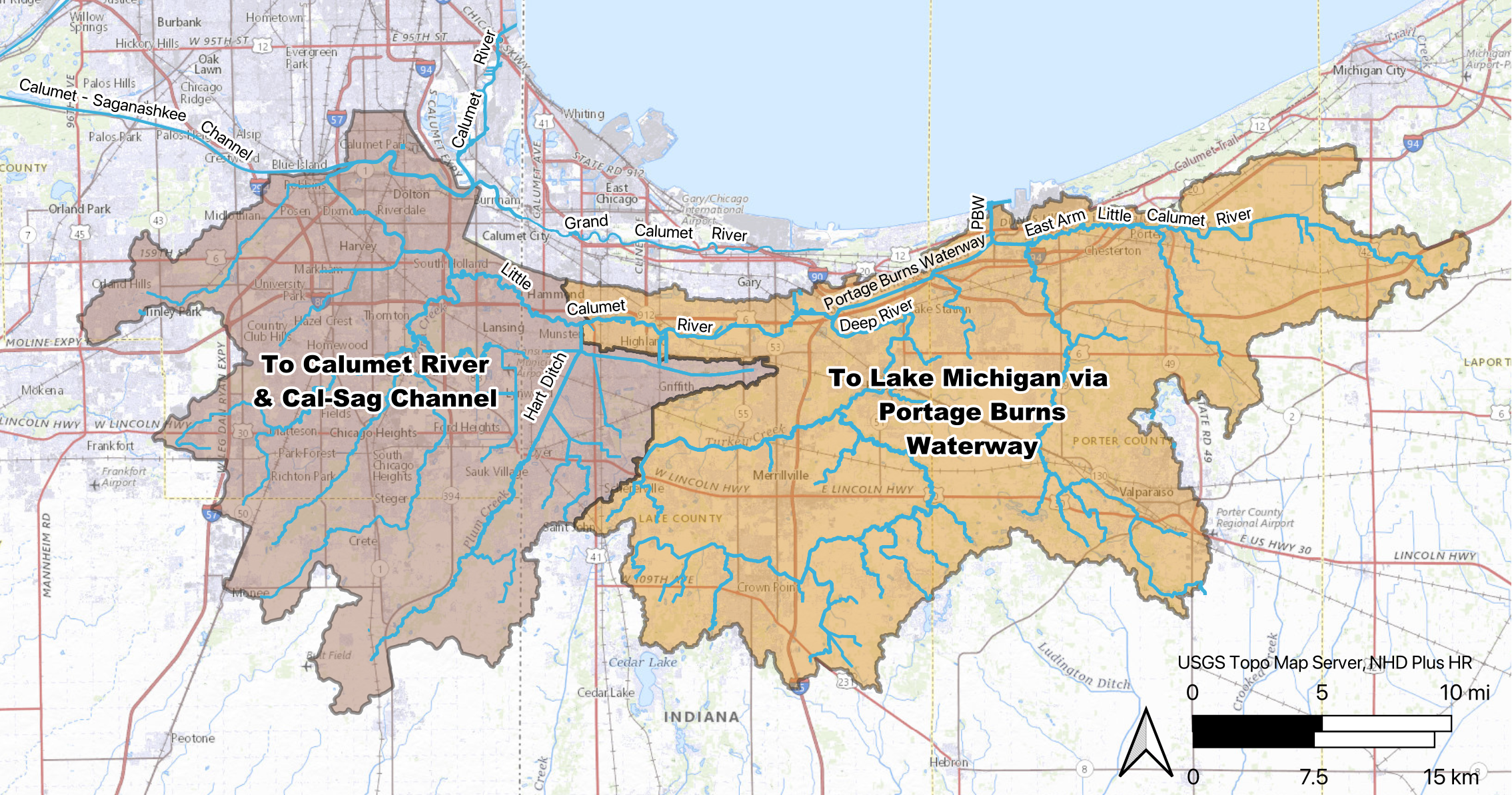
Map of the watershed of the Little Calumet River, differentiating drainage to the Cal-Sag Channel and to Lake Michigan via the Portage Burns Waterway.

Map showing the westernmost portion of the watershed ad the Cal-Sag Channel connection to the Chicago Sanitary and Ship Canal and other area rivers

=== Calumet River ===
The Calumet River, on the south side of Chicago, originally simply drained Lake Calumet to Lake Michigan. A canal extending it, legendarily claimed to have been created by voyageurs at the site of a frequent portage, was dug connecting the two Calumet Rivers at the point where the name now changes from Grand to Little.

The T.J. O'Brien Lock and Dam was installed across the river in 1960 to control the movement of water between Lake Michigan and the river.

=== Grand Calumet River ===
The Grand Calumet River, originating in Miller Beach, flows 16.0 miles (25.7 km) through the cities of Gary, East Chicago and Hammond, as well as Calumet City and Burnham on the Illinois side. The majority of the river's flow drains into Lake Michigan via the Indiana Harbor and Ship Canal, sending about 1,500 cubic feet (42 m^{3}) per second of water into the lake. Today, a large portion of the river's flow originates as municipal and industrial effluent, cooling and process water and storm water overflows. Although discharges have been reduced, a number of contaminants continue to impair the area.

=== Little Calumet River ===
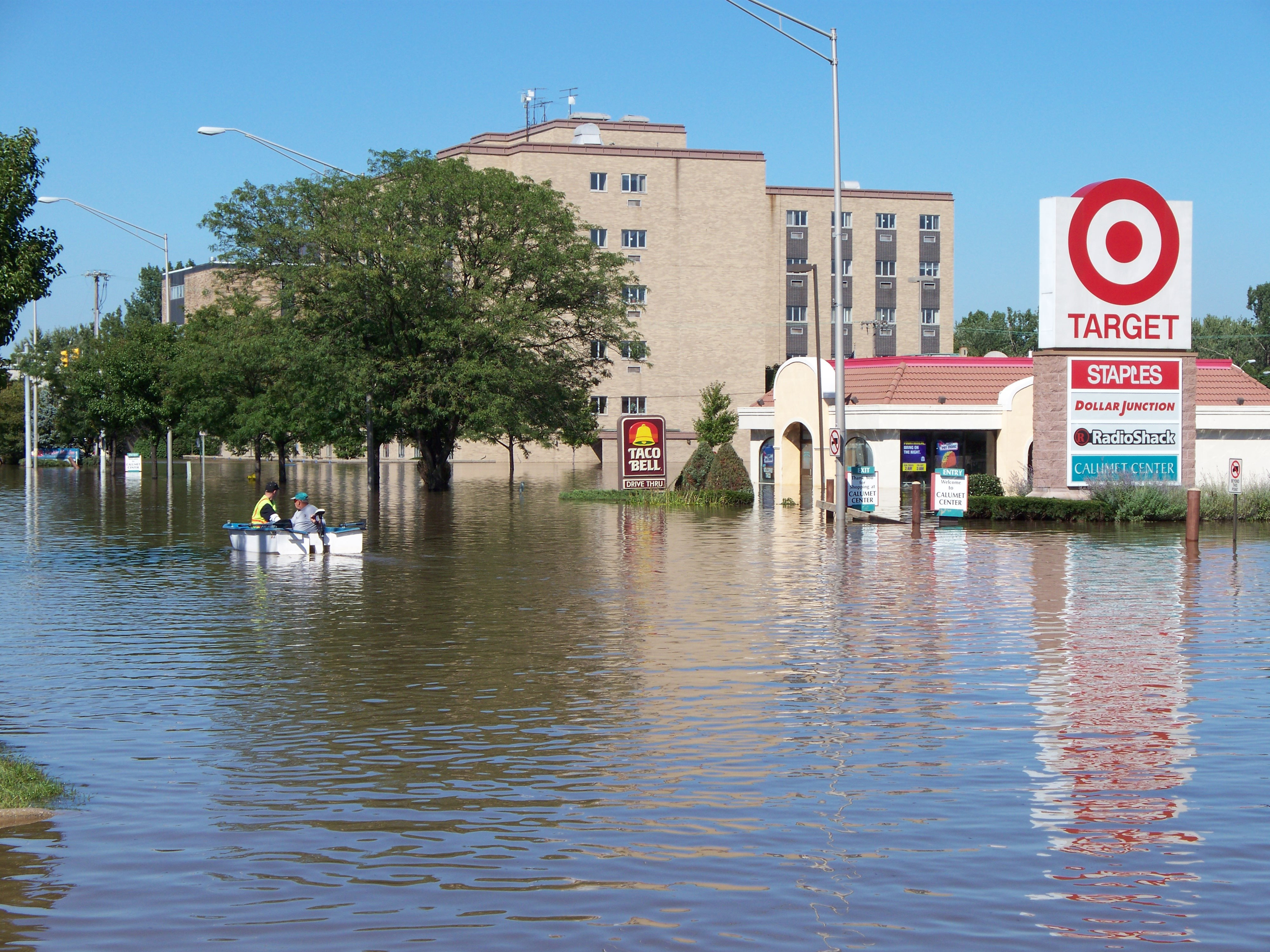
Residents boat through floodwaters of the Little Calumet in Munster in September 2008

The Little Calumet River originally flowed from New Durham Township, LaPorte County, Indiana, to its junction with the Grand Calumet and Calumet rivers. Construction of the Portage Burns Waterway (Burns Ditch) in 1926 split the direction of flow of the Little Calumet River, at Hart Ditch, east of which it flows into Lake Michigan at the Port of Indiana Burns International Harbor. The confluence with Hart Ditch is located west of US-41 in North Township, Lake County. The Burns Ditch channelized the path of the Little Calumet River from its confluence with Deep River, at Three Rivers County Park, to the Port of Indiana by cutting through the Indiana Dunes. Three Rivers County Park is located on the border of Gary and Lake Station where I-65 meets the Borman Expressway.

East of the Burns Ditch the river is called the East Arm Little Calumet River, west of the Burns ditch it is named Little Calumet River. The Little Calumet River flows through or borders the towns of Portage, Lake Station, Gary, Highland, Griffith, Munster, and Hammond, then through South Holland, Dolton, Lansing, Calumet City, Harvey, Riverdale, Phoenix, Dixmoor, Burnham, and Blue Island in Illinois, connecting to the Cal-Sag Channel and at the junction of the Grand Calumet River and Calumet River. This arm of the river is 41 miles (66 km) long. The Little Calumet has 109 miles (175 km) of river and tributaries and drains 213 square miles (550 km^{2}). The major tributaries are Deep River and its Turkey Creek sub-tributary, and the Salt Creek tributary of the East Arm Little Calumet River. Each tributary originates on the Valparaiso Moraine and flows north to the Little Calumet River.

The East Arm Little Calumet River, also known as the Little Calumet River East Branch begins just east of Holmesville in New Durham Township, LaPorte County, Indiana, and also flows through Chesterton, Porter, and Burns Harbor where it connects to the Port of Indiana-Burns Waterway. It has a total length of 22 miles (35 km). It used to continue westward to Illinois as the Little Calumet River, but construction of the Burns Waterway in 1926 diverted its flow into Lake Michigan.

Until sometime in the late 1940s or early 1950s, the Little Calumet River was heavily polluted with sewage, and the only fish living in the river were carp. During heavy spring rains, the river would often flood areas adjacent to the river.

The Little Calumet River has been undergoing construction of a $200 million flood control and recreation project by the Chicago District of the U.S. Army Corps of Engineers since 1990. The project was expected to be complete in 2013. The project includes construction of 22 miles (35 km) of levees and floodwalls, a control structure at Hart Ditch, and almost 17 miles (27 km) of hiking trails. Additionally, seven miles (11 km) of the river channel is being relocated to allow better water flow, and highway bridges are being modified to permit unobstructed flow of water. A flood warning system is also being implemented. When complete, the project will protect over 9,500 homes and businesses in the towns of Gary, Griffith, Highland, Hammond, and Munster in Indiana, and prevent nearly $11 million in flood damage annually. On September 15, 2008, the remnants of Hurricane Ike released heavy rain which flooded the banks of the Little Calumet River. Houses and strip malls in northern Munster and southern Hammond were evacuated. Hundreds of homes were damaged due to flooding. Recently, a new levee, along Northcote Avenue in Munster, is being built to protect residents from future floods.

=== Cal-Sag Channel ===
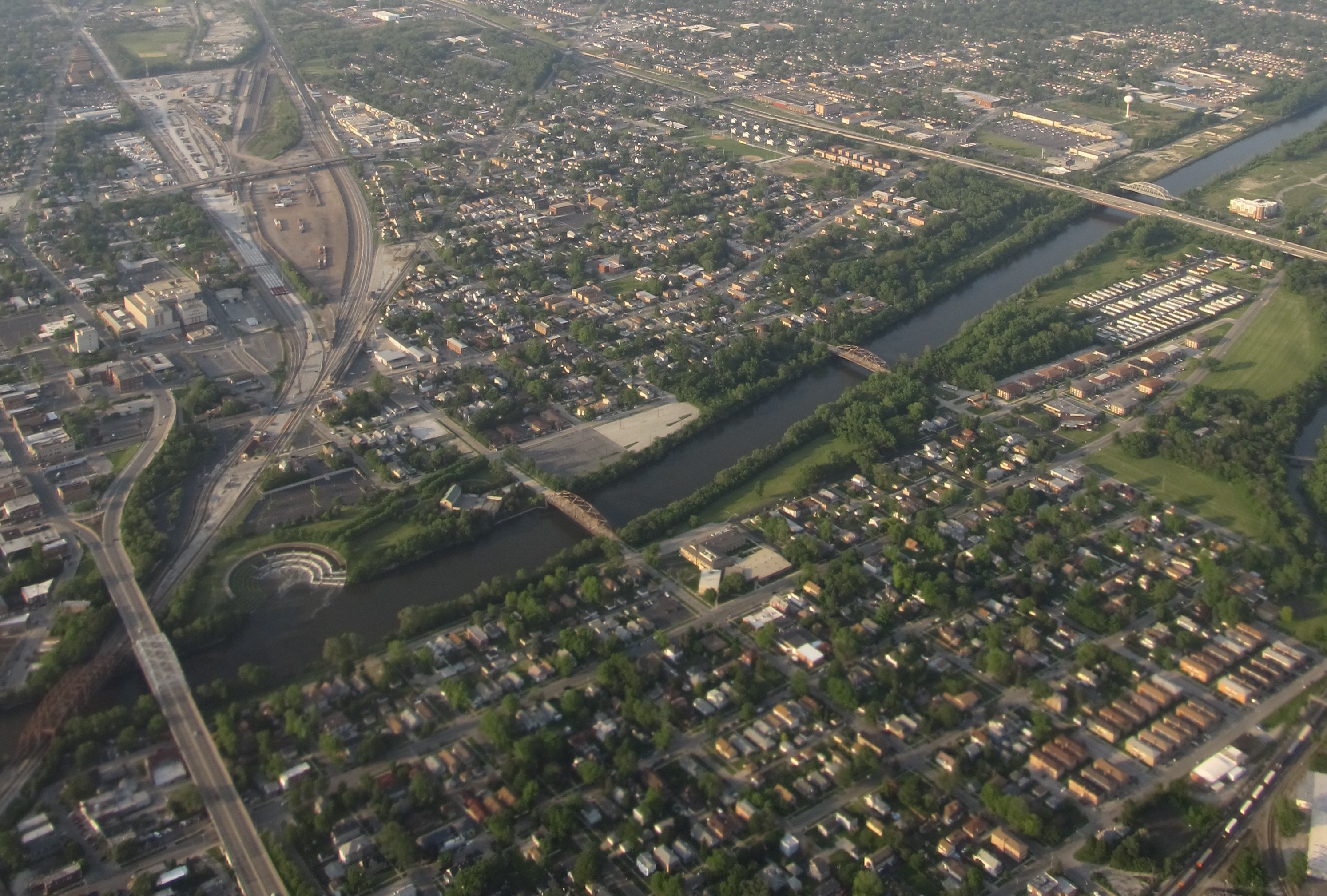
Calumet Sag Channel, Blue Island

The Cal-Sag Channel (short for "Calumet-Saganashkee Channel") is a navigation canal in southern Cook County, Illinois. It serves as a channel between the Little Calumet River and the Chicago Sanitary and Ship Canal. It is 16 miles (26 km) long and was dug over an 11-year period, from 1911 until 1922.

The Cal-Sag Channel serves barge traffic in what was an active zone of heavy industry in the far southern neighborhoods of the city of Chicago and adjacent suburbs. As of 2006 it was also used more as a conduit for wastewater from southern Cook County, including the Chicago-area Deep Tunnel Project, into the Illinois Waterway. It is also used by pleasure crafts in the summer time.

The western 4.5 miles (7.2 km) of the channel flow through the Palos Forest Preserves, a collection of protected County Forest Preserves operated by the Forest Preserve District of Cook County.

The Cal-Sag Channel served as the rowing venue for the 1959 Pan American Games.

When it is completed, the Calumet-Sag Trail, a 26-mile-long (42-kilometer) greenway, will border the channel and will stretch from the Chicago Sanitary and Ship Canal to the Burnham Greenway.

== See also ==
- Indiana Harbor and Ship Canal
- Lake Calumet
- List of Illinois rivers
- List of Indiana rivers
