= Chicago Yacht Club Race to Mackinac =

Annual freshwater yacht race in the United States

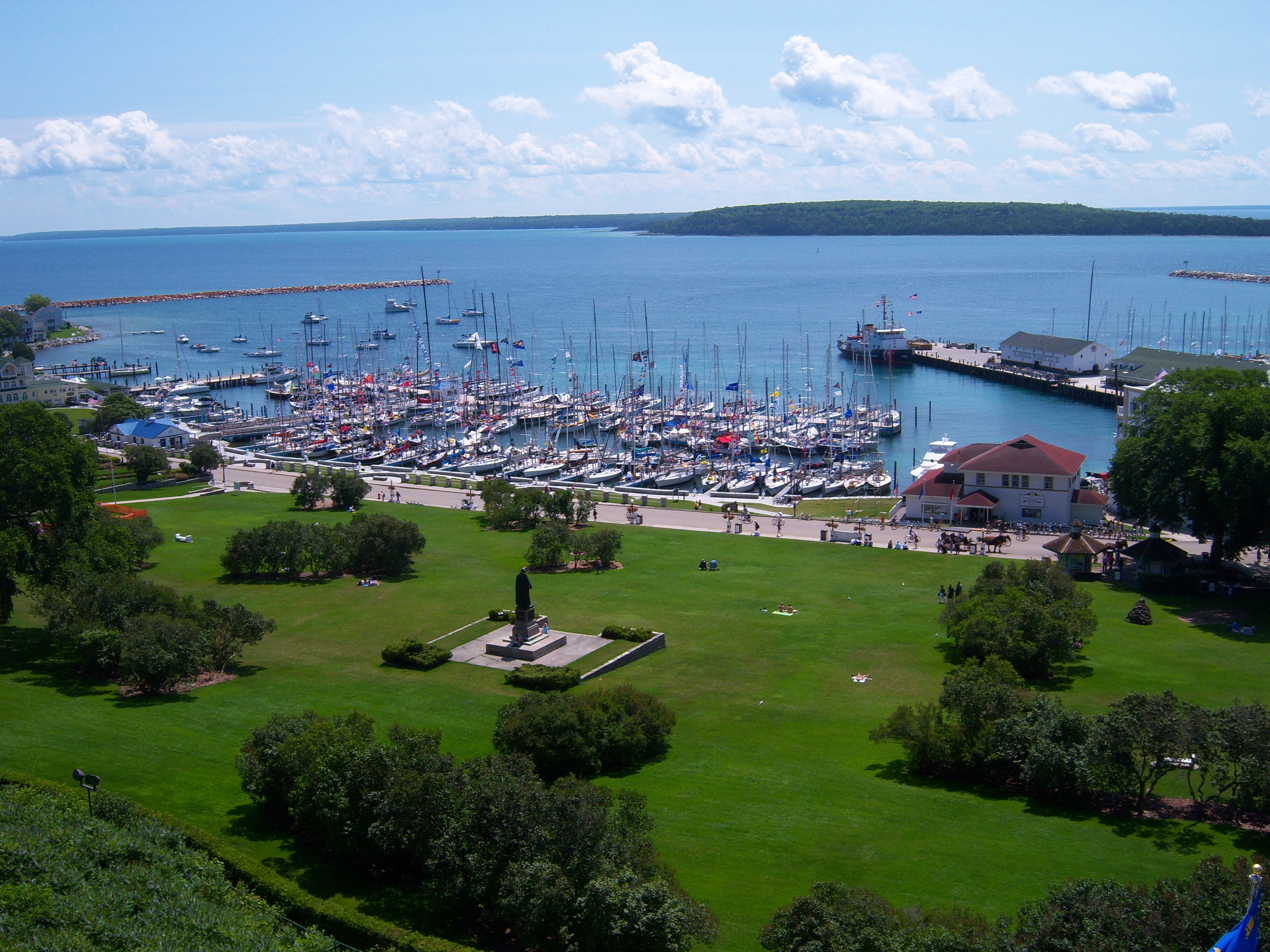
- Mackinac Island Harbor on June 29, 2009, at the end of the race.
- First held: 1898; 128 years ago
- Organizer: Chicago Yacht Club
- Start: Chicago, Illinois
- Finish: Mackinac Island, Michigan
- Length: 333 mi (289 nmi; 536 km)
- Website: www.cycracetomackinac.com

The Chicago Yacht Club Race to Mackinac is a 333-mile (289 nmi; 536 km) annual yacht race starting in Lake Michigan off Chicago, Illinois, and ending in Lake Huron off Mackinac Island, Michigan. It is hosted and managed by the Chicago Yacht Club. The "Mac" (as it is known) was first run in 1898 and is the oldest annual freshwater distance race in the world. The race hosts several hundred competitors each year and over 3,000 sailors.

== Course ==
The race starts at the Chicago Harbor Lighthouse just off Navy Pier, heads northeast to cross Lake Michigan, enters Lake Huron at the Straits of Mackinac, and finishes in the Round Island Channel, off Mackinac Island, Michigan. The race course runs 333 mi (536 km). In 2011, 361 boats entered the race. Steve Fossett set the overall race record, 18 hours, 50 minutes, in 1998 with the multihull yacht, Stars and Stripes. Team Maverick, in 2024, set the monohull record, 22 hours, 24 minutes, and 23 seconds. Beating the previous record set 22 years ago by more than an hour.

== History ==
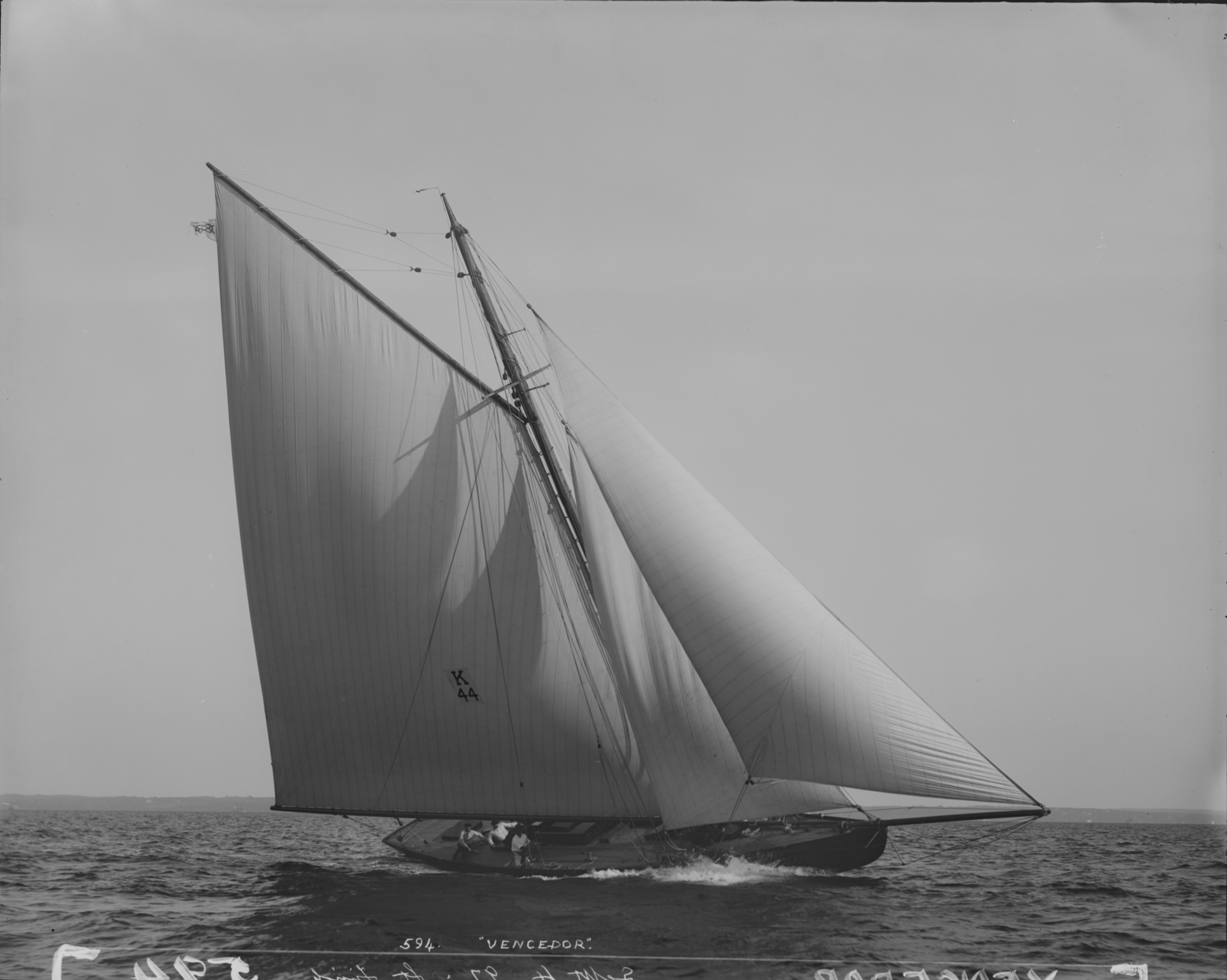
Vencedor beat Vanenna in the 1904 race but broke up on rocks during the 1911 race.

The race began in 1898 with a mere five boats. After the first race in 1898, the Race to Mackinac was not held for five years until the second race in 1904. By 1906, the race had developed a healthy following and, in that year, the original Mackinac trophy was purchased. The race has seen occasional sustained violent weather in the blows of 1911, 1937 and 1970. After gale-force winds took down most of the fleet in the Mac of 1911, the finish in the 1912 and 1913 races was changed to Harbor Springs on Little Traverse Bay instead of Mackinac Island. Race organizers felt the shorter distance was safer. From 1914 until 1916 the Mac was back to its full distance until WWI. From 1917 to 1920 there were no Mac races due to the strains of the War, which took away yachtsmen and put many boats out of commission. From 1921 to 2019 and returning in 2021, the Race to Mackinac has run consecutively every year and remains the longest annual freshwater distance race.

The monohull record of 22 hours, 24 minutes, and 23 seconds set by Team Maverick in 2024, and Steve Fossett on Stars and Stripes set the multihull record of 18 hours, 50 minutes, and 32 seconds in 1998. Both records still stand today. The unpredictable weather and fickle winds on Lake Michigan make the Race to Mackinac a supreme test, which many competitors feel rivals any ocean race.

2008 marked the 110th anniversary of the first race, and the 100th time sailors raced 333 miles from Chicago to Mackinac Island. Although there have been changes to the race over the years, the basic elements of this venerable contest have remained unchanged for over 100 years. Stripped down to its essence, The Mac, like all sailboat racing, is still primarily a test of strength, endurance, strategy and willpower. And let's not forget the dearest friend (and most menacing foe) of all sailors—the wind."

The Chicago Yacht Club Race to Mackinac Race is often confused with the Port Huron to Mackinac Boat Race. They were held on the same weekend until 1939, when both clubs agreed to alternate the date of their Mackinac races, scheduling them a week apart.

The 104th running of the race began on July 21, 2012. 320 boats were entered in the race. All boats completed the race. The Mackinac Trophy was won by Providence, owned by Greg and Jerry Miarecki, representing the Chicago Yacht Club. The Mackinac Cup was won by Tom & Joe Londrigan's Realt Na Mara. George and Scott Petriz won the Double Handed division in TFWB Relentless. Lori & Jonathan Alvord won the multihull division in Triceratops. The Chicago Yacht Club's Ron White won the Martin D. Rieck Trophy for the first multihull to finish in Cheeke Monkey. The Royono Trophy, given for the first monohull to finish, was won by Peter Thornton's Il Mostro, representing the Chicago Yacht Club. In the Cruising division, Intuition, owned by Tom Kershner, Mark Gillespie, Chris Hynes, Bill Burns, and Jenn Macainag from Madison, Wisconsin, won the 42 boat division. Infinite Diversion, a Hanse 630e owned by Chicago Yacht Club Commodore Joe Haas, was first to finish in the Cruising Division.

2020 saw the race going on hiatus, and plans to return the next year. It was the first time in a century that it was cancelled.

=== Incidents ===
On night of Sunday, 17 July 2011 - during the 103rd running of the race - two sailors died when WingNuts, a high performance keeled sportsboat Kiwi 35, (berthed in Saginaw, Michigan) capsized and turtled in 75 mile per hour winds. These were the first race-related fatalities in the history of the race. Later inquiry said that the boat — specifically its high performance extremely wide low displacement hull — was unfit for the location, weather and the multiday and lengthy race, and urged race officials to change ratings and revoke privileges to enter the race. (Note: On the other hand, one meteorologist suggested: "Veteran Chicago-Mac racers have encountered similar conditions during previous races and understand that coping with severe weather is part of the challenge. Skippers must prepare their boats, train their crew, maintain a watchful eye for approaching storms and "the dearest friend (and most menacing foe) of all sailors -- the wind." Thornton, Mark A. (August 2011). "2011 Chicago-Mackinac Race: A Meteorological Summary".) The waves were not all that unusual, although the wind was. The boat may have buried one of its hiking wings into a wave, causing it to 'trip,' and had the other lifted by the wind. It is rare but not unheard of for keelboats to turtle and remain upside down, particularly if it has not lost its keel. However, this boat's unique hull form, which made it very fast, also rendered it more stable upside down than right side up. This was a recipe for the disaster. This loss was occasioned despite a competent and experienced crew which was as well equipped and prepared as thought to be necessary. WingNuts met then current offshore stability standards, which failed to adequately take into account the effect of the "radical" winged hull. (Note: "On paper, WingNuts met all stability requirements for the Chicago-Mac race. The race required that all boats have an Offshore Racing Rule (ORR) handicap measurement certificate, a document that includes two measures of stability: Limit of Positive Stability (LPS) and the Stability Index (SI). However, after the accident, the US Sailing panel found that the ORR formulas did not adequately penalize the Kiwi 35’s extreme flare, the difference between the waterline beam and the maximum beam. When the panel eliminated a fixed lower limit for the “capsize increment” — one of the factors used in the calculating stability index — WingNuts’ index of 100.7 plummeted to 74.4. No other boat in the race had the same drastic reduction in its stability index when the same math was applied. In addition, the panel noted that the Right Arm Curve (GZ Curve)—a graphic representation of the boat’s stability—revealed WingNuts to be just as stable inverted as it was right side up, sharply reducing any chance of recovery from a full capsize." "PS Analysis: The 2011 WingNuts Capsize Practical Sailor". Practical Sailor. April 2012.)

In the 110th running of the race on July 21, 2018, Jon Santarelli, a 53-year-old sailor aboard the Transpac 52 sailing vessel Imedi slipped overboard during a wave strike approximately 5 nautical miles (5.8 mi; 9.3 km) beyond the start line. After a nearly seven-hour search by approximately 20 boats and three helicopters from the US Coast Guard, Chicago Fire, Chicago Police, Chicago Yacht Club, and competing vessels covering nearly 47 square miles, the search was suspended, and Santarelli was presumed lost. On the afternoon of July 28, 2018 - nearly a week after the original incident - his body was recovered by a Chicago Police Marine Unit approximately 6 miles (5.2 nmi; 9.7 km) offshore from Belmont Harbor and identified by the Cook County Medical Examiner's Office as Santarelli.

== Race management ==
The Race to Mackinac is organized and managed by the Mac Committee, a group of active Chicago Yacht Club member-volunteers. The committee represents the club as the Race Organizing Authority and is led by the chairman. The committee planning process is 12 months long and accounts for thousands of volunteer hours.

The first Mackinac Chairman was Mark H. Baxter (1972-73 & 1977–78). Since then there have been over twenty individuals who have led this venerable race. The Mackinac chairpersons have included some notables: At the age of 36, the youngest chairman ever to serve was Gregory J. Miarecki (2008–09), who coincidentally chaired the 100th running of the venerable race in 2008 along with Honorary Chair Roy E. Disney. The first "chairwoman" was Ms. Ann Moorman (1994–95). The first Hispanic to be appointed chairman was Louis Sandoval (2012–13). Two individuals who have served as chair have gone on to become Commodore of Chicago Yacht Club- Gregory J. Miarecki (2015-2016) and Louis Sandoval (2019-2020 ). (Note: The committee has also taken the promotion of offshore sailboat racing to new heights. Their first introduction of social media began in 2008 with Facebook and Twitter with the goal of bringing the sport of sailing to fans following on land. Today, over 8900 fans follow the race via Facebook and podcast- the most of any off-shore distance sailboat race in the world.)

In 2004, the organizers debuted race tracking systems on select boats in the fleet. By 2006, with advances in technology and smaller sized components, trackers and race tracking interface using GPS transceivers became standard on each boat. Today, each boat is equipped with small palm sized messenger/trackers that allow two-way communication of each boat's position on the race course and limited messaging capabilities.

== Island Goats Sailing Society ==
Sailors who have completed 25 or more of these annual races may apply for membership in the Island Goat Sailing Society and are referred to as "Old Goats" or "Island Goats". In 1959, the Island Goats Sailing Society was formed with 10 of these sailors to perpetuate and commemorate the Chicago to Mackinac Race, along with its legends and lore. By 2019, the society had grown to 390 members in good standing. In mid-July 1962, the race was won by Clare S. Jacobs, former 1908 London Olympic Pole Vaulting Bronze Medalist and founder of the F. L. Jacobs Company, though the time was slow, and Jacobs's Falcon II was given a handicap as it was smaller than several other competitors.
