= Chicago Harbor Lock =

Stop lock and dam in Illinois, US

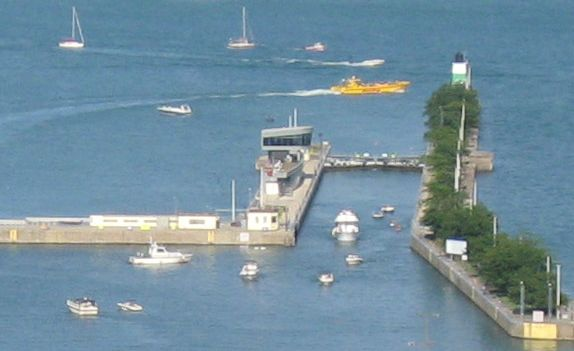
- Aerial view of the lock in 2009
- 41.8884°N 87.6064°W
- Waterway: Chicago River
- Country: United States
- State: Illinois
- County: Cook County
- Maintained by: US Army Corps of Engineers
- Operation: Hydraulic
- First built: 1938
- Latest built: 2011
- Length: 600 ft (180 m)
- Width: 80 ft (24 m)
- Fall: 2 to 5 ft (0.61 to 1.52 m)
- Above sea level: 582 ft (177 m)

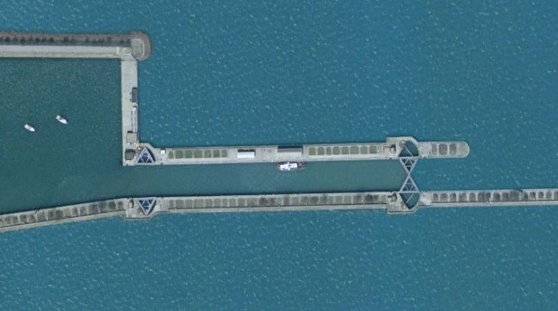
Satellite view of the Chicago Harbor Lock separating the Chicago River (left) from Lake Michigan (right). The west gate is open and the east gate is closed putting the lock chamber at the level of the river.

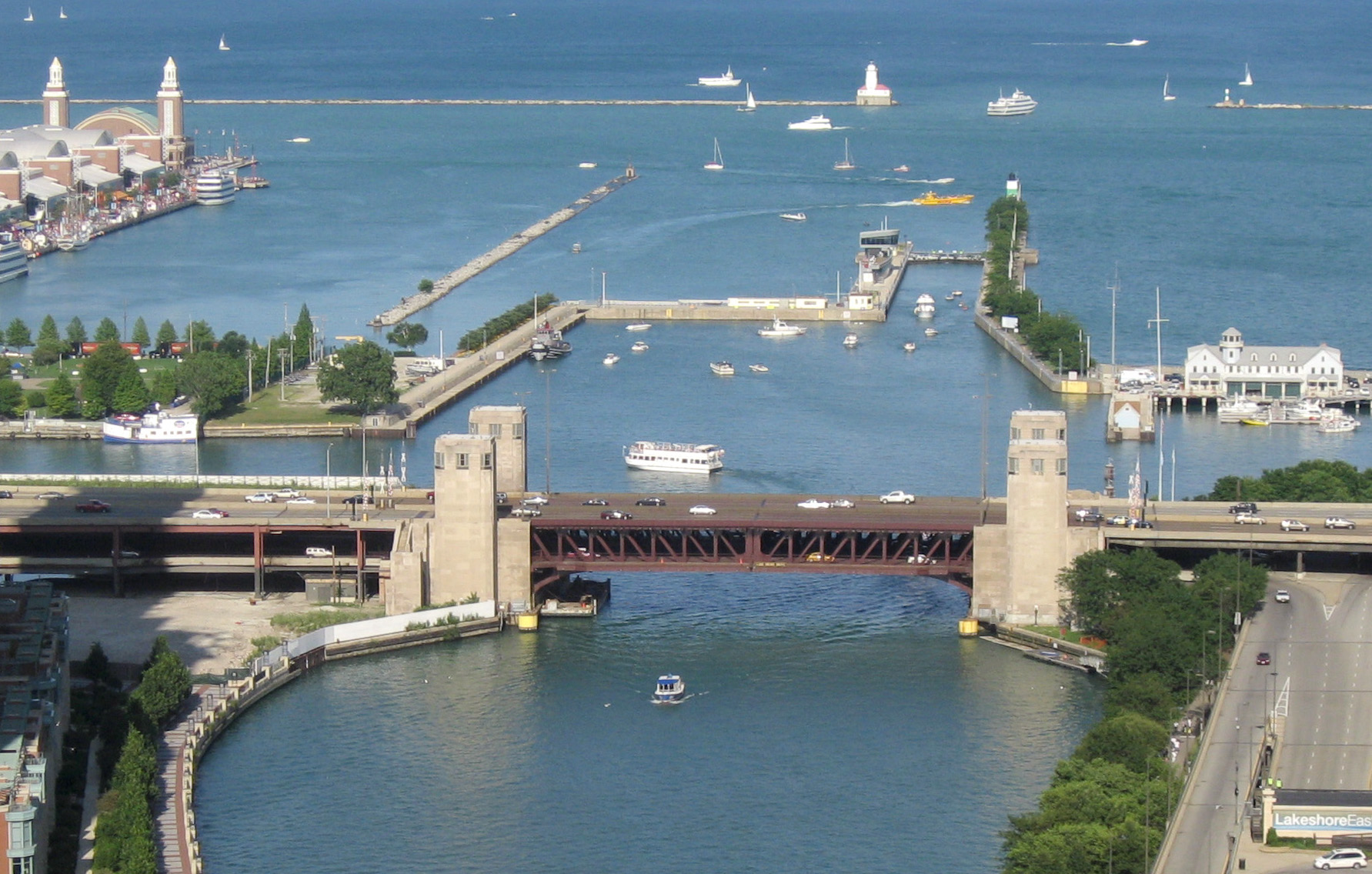
View towards lock from one of Chicago's high-rises, with the Outer Drive Bridge in the foreground

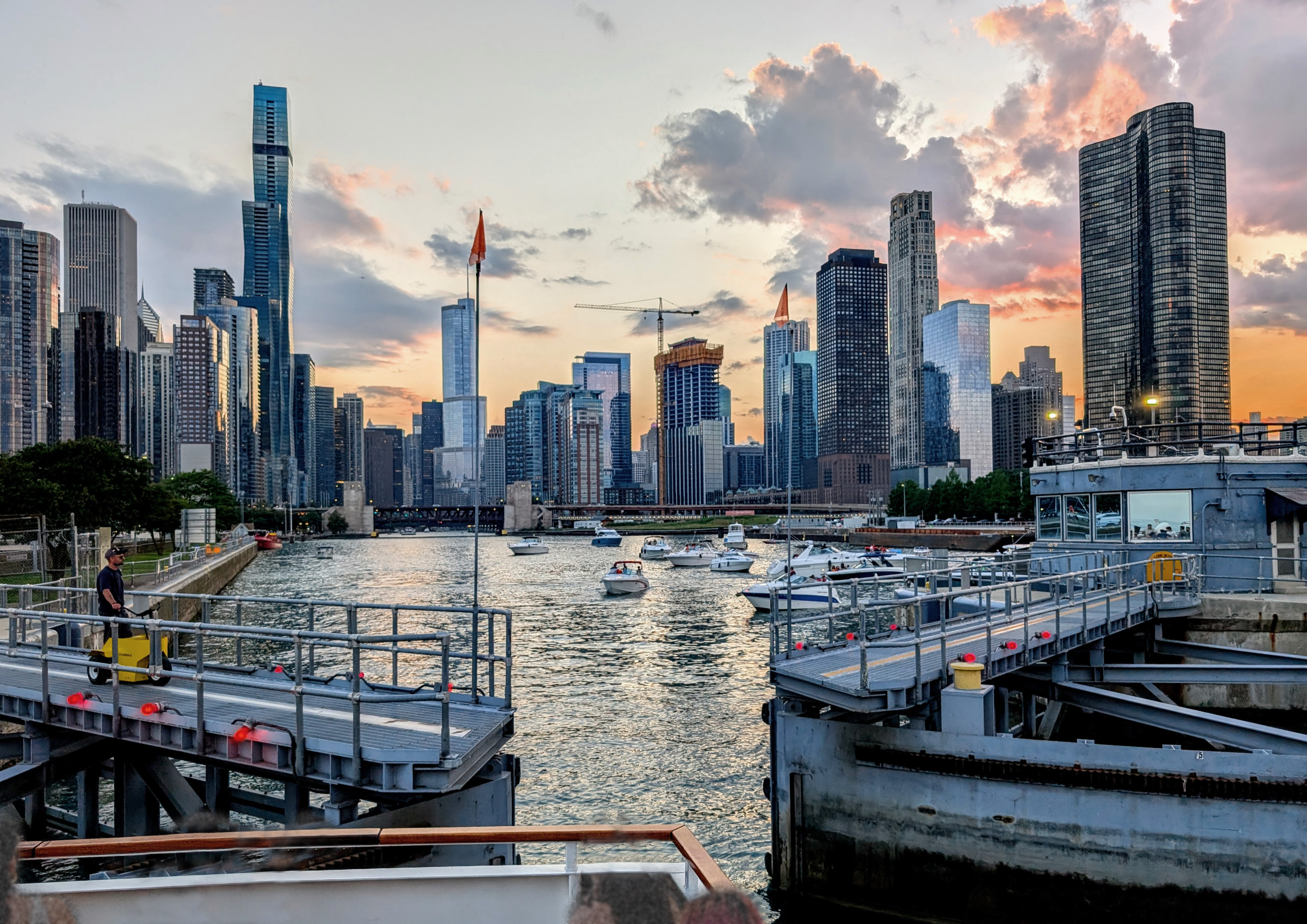
The lock closing behind a tourist boat

The Chicago Harbor Lock, also known as the Chicago River & Harbor Controlling Works, is a stop lock and dam located within the Chicago Harbor in Chicago, Illinois, at the mouth of the Chicago River. It is a component of the Chicago Area Waterway System, and is used to control water diversion from Lake Michigan into the river and for navigation.

== History ==
The lock was built between 1936 and 1938 by the Sanitary District of Chicago primarily as a means of limiting diversion of water from Lake Michigan, but also as a component of the project to reverse the flow of the Chicago River to improve the water quality of the lake and for improved navigation. It is one of two entrances from the Great Lakes to the Chicago Area Waterway System, the other entrance being the T.J. O'Brien Lock and Dam on the Calumet River.

In 1984, maintenance and operation of the lock was transferred to the U.S. Army Corps of Engineers, though operation of the controlling works sluice gates stayed with the Metropolitan Water Reclamation District.

== Overview ==
The lock chamber is 600 feet (180 m) long, 80 feet (24 m) wide, and 22 feet (6.7 m) deep and can accommodate up to 100 vessels at once. It contains two pair of 30 feet (9.1 m) tall sector gates. The lock requires 12–15 minutes to cycle through a typical water-level difference of two to five feet (0.61 to 1.52 m). Water level is controlled via gravity by partially opening and closing the lock gates.

The controlling works contains eight sluice gates along its piers, each measuring 10 feet (3.0 m) x 10 feet (3.0 m), allowing water from Lake Michigan into the river for navigational and sanitation purposes during normal weather operations, and for allowing water out of the swollen river into the lake during heavy rainfall periods as a measure of last resort for flood control purposes.

The Chicago Harbor Lock is the fourth-busiest lock in the nation for commercial use and the second-busiest in the nation for recreational use.

== See also ==
- Chicago Harbor
- Chicago Area Waterway System
- Port of Chicago
