= Chicago Harbor =

Harbor system in Chicago

Coordinates: 41°53′20″N 87°36′42″W

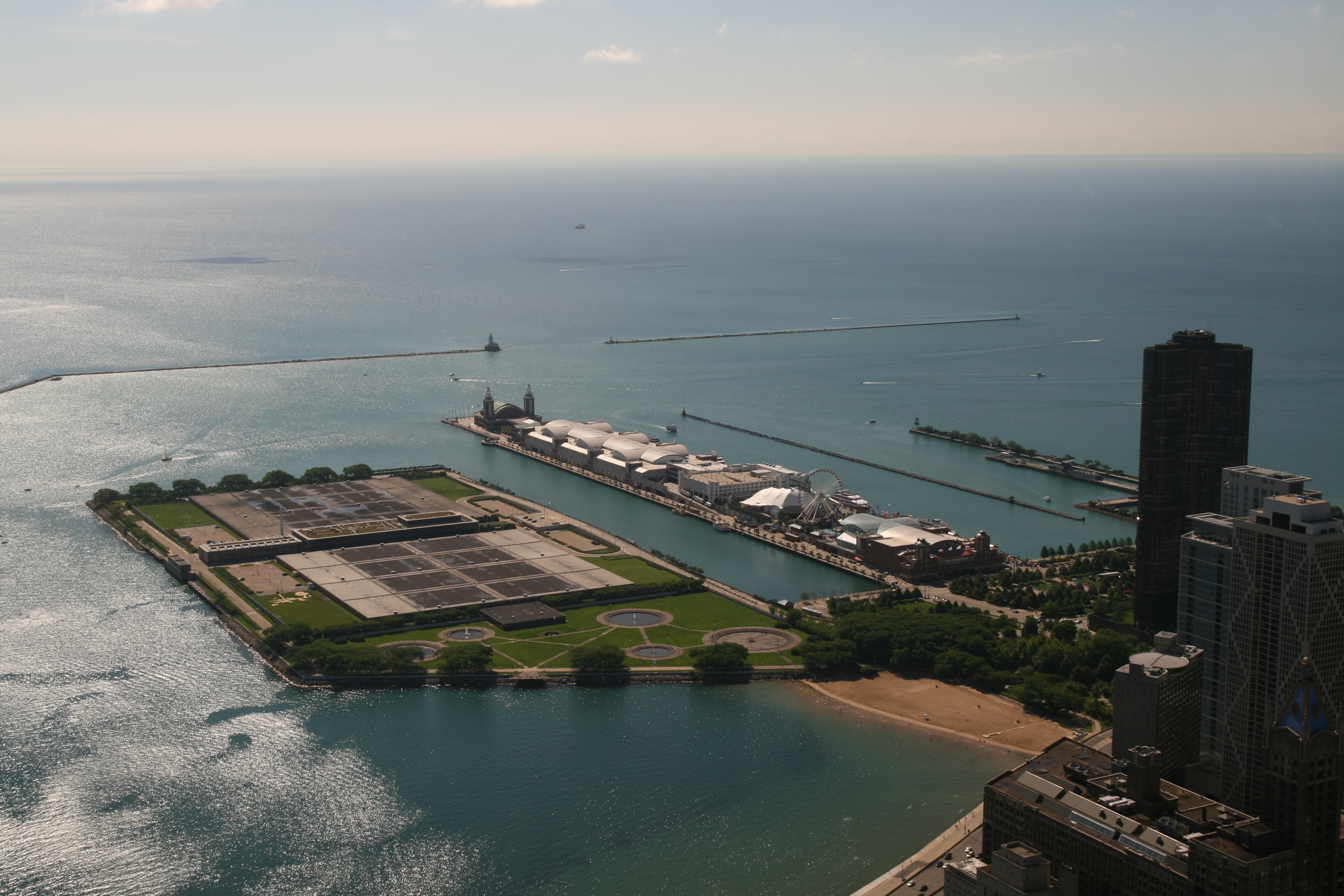
An east-southeast view in Chicago, Illinois, overlooking the Jardine Water Purification Plant and Navy Pier in Chicago Harbor, including the north and south breakwaters and the Chicago Harbor Lighthouse

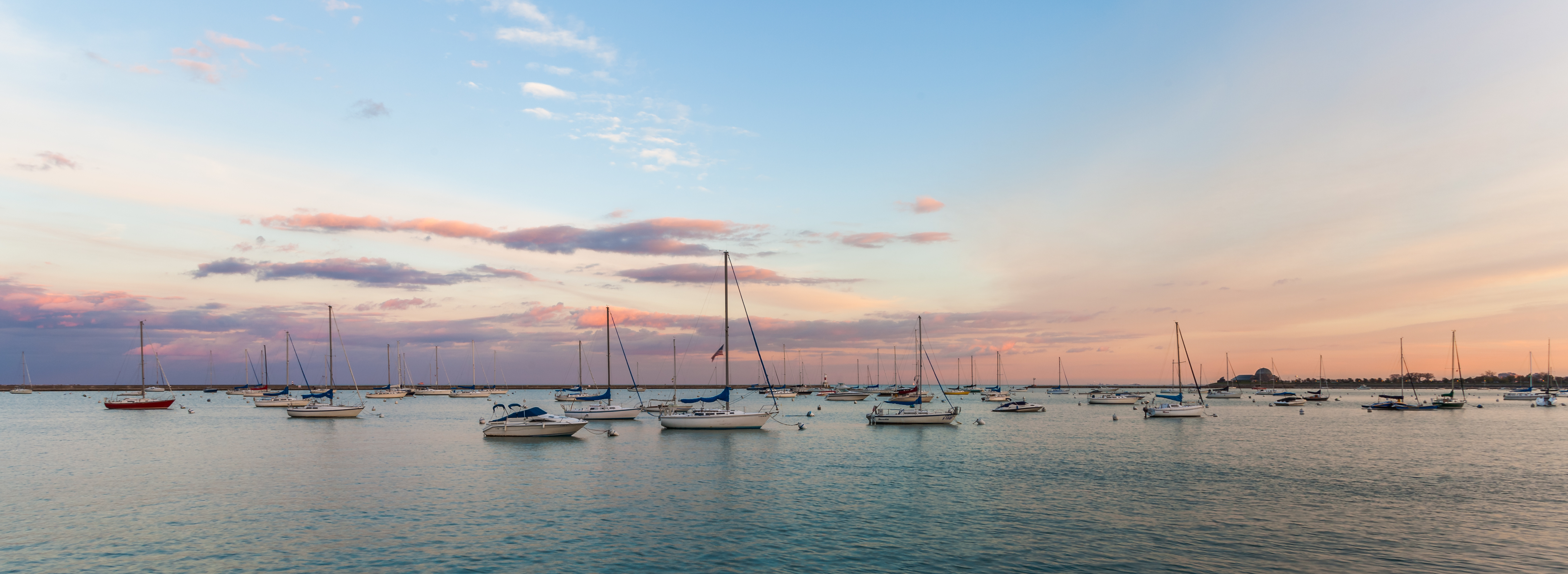
Monroe harbor.

Generally, the Chicago Harbor comprises the public rivers, canals, and lakes within the territorial limits of the City of Chicago and all connecting slips, basins, piers, breakwaters, and permanent structures therein for a distance of three miles from the shore between the extended north and south lines of the city. The greater Chicago Harbor includes portions of the Chicago River, the Calumet River, the Ogden Canal, the Chicago Sanitary and Ship Canal, Lake Calumet, and Lake Michigan.

In a more narrow sense, the Chicago Harbor is that artificial harbor on Lake Michigan located at the mouth of the Chicago River bounded by outer breakwaters to the north and east, Northerly Island to the south, and the Chicago shoreline to the west. The main entrance to this harbor is marked by the Chicago Harbor Lighthouse. The Jardine Water Purification Plant, Navy Pier, the Chicago Harbor Lock, Coast Guard Station Chicago, two municipal harbors (DuSable Harbor and Monroe Harbor), the Chicago Yacht Club, and the Columbia Yacht Club are all located here.

The Port of Chicago is within the greater Chicago Harbor in and around Calumet Harbor, the Calumet River, and Lake Calumet.

The Chicago Park District operates a municipal harbor system in the greater Chicago Harbor in Lake Michigan for recreational boaters. With accommodations for 6000 boats, it is the largest system of its kind in the nation. The system comprises (from north to south) Montrose Harbor, Belmont Harbor, Diversey Harbor, DuSable Harbor, Monroe Harbor, Burnham Harbor, 31st Street Harbor, 59th Street Harbor, and Jackson Park Inner and Outer Harbors.

== See also ==
- Chicago Area Waterway System
- Port of Chicago
