= List of fatal accidents in sailboat racing =

Oceanic yacht racing is one of the most dangerous sports in the world. It was particularly dangerous in the early days, when oceanic racing was more like early mountain climbing in terms of sense of adventure and achievement. Modern safety and communication equipment has improved safety; however, like any sport in the natural environment, risk is always present. In many races, participants have changed from amateur explorers to professional athletes.

== Deaths during crewed round-the-world races and record attempts ==
Race Name	Date	Name	Place	Boat	Description
Whitbread / Volvo Ocean Race	1973–1974	Paul Waterhouse, Dominique Guillet, Bernie Hosking	Southern Ocean	Tauranga, 33 Export, Great Britain II (respectively)	Each swept overboard (Hosking twice)
Whitbread / Volvo Ocean Race	1989	Tony Phillips	Southern Ocean	Creighton Naturally	Swept overboard and recovered too late
Volvo Ocean Race	18 May 2006	Hans Horrevoets (NED)	Off Land's End (United Kingdom)	ABN Amro Volvo 70	Washed overboard and recovered
Clipper Round the World Yacht Race	5 Sep 2015	Andrew Ashman (GBR)	Atlantic Ocean	IchorCoal / Clipper 70	Head Injury Boom/Mainsheet
Clipper Round the World Yacht Race	1 April 2016	Sarah Young (GBR)	Pacific Ocean	IchorCoal / Clipper 70	Swept overboard
Clipper Round the World Yacht Race	18 Nov 2017	Simon Speirs (GBR)	Indian Ocean	Great Britain / Clipper 70	Swept overboard
Volvo Ocean Race	26 Mar 2018	John Fisher (GBR)	Southern Ocean	Team Sun Hung Kai/Scallywag Volvo Ocean 65	Swept overboard

== Deaths during solo round-the-world races and record attempts ==
Race Name	Date	Name	Place	Boat	Description
Sunday Times Golden Globe Race	1969	Donald Crowhurst (GBR)	Atlantic Ocean	Teignmouth Electron	Lost at sea, Possible suicide
BOC Challenge	1986	Jacques de Roux (FRA)	Southern Ocean	Skoiern IV	Lost at sea
Vendée Globe	1992	Nigel Burgess (GBR)	Atlantic Ocean	Nigel Burgess Yachts	Lost at sea
Vendée Globe	1992	Mike Plant (USA)	Atlantic Ocean	Coyote	Lost at sea prior to departure
Vendée Globe	1997	Gerry Roufs (CAN)	Southern Ocean	Groupe LG 2	Lost at sea

== Deaths during offshore races ==
Race Name	Host Club	Date	Name	Place	Boat	Description	Ref.
1976 OSTAR	Royal Western Yacht Club	June 1976	Mike Flanagan (USA)	Atlantic Ocean	Galloping Gael	38 ft Monohull; Sailor and Boat Lost at Sea	
1976 OSTAR	Royal Western Yacht Club	June 1976	Mike McMullen (GBR)	Atlantic Ocean	Three Cheers	Sailor and Boat Lost at Sea	
1978 Route du Rhum		16 November 1978	Alain Colas	Azores	Manureva	Unknown	
1979 Fastnet race	Royal Ocean Racing Club	14 August 1979	15 competitors and 6 observers	Celtic Sea			
1998 Sydney to Hobart Yacht Race	Cruising Yacht Club of Australia	27 December 1998	Phillip Charles Skeggs	(Australia)	Business Post Naiad	drowned	
1998 Sydney to Hobart Yacht Race	Cruising Yacht Club of Australia	27 December 1998	Bruce Raymond Guy	(Australia)	Business Post Naiad	heart attack	
1998 Sydney to Hobart Yacht Race	Cruising Yacht Club of Australia	27 December 1998	Glyn Charles (GBR)	(Australia)	Sword of Orion		
1998 Sydney to Hobart Yacht Race	Cruising Yacht Club of Australia	28 December 1998	John Dean, James Lawler, Michael Bannister	(Australia)	Winston Churchill	all drowned	
Doublehanded Farallones Race		27 March 1999	Harvey Shlasky (USA), 51	(United States)	White Lightning, J/29		
Transat Jacques Vabre		21 October 1999	Paul Vatine (FRA), 42	(France)	ORMA 60	Boat Capsized Paul was ondeck and lost other crew member was below deck	
Doublehanded Lightship Race	Island Yacht Club of Alameda	16 March 2008	Matthew Gale (USA), 68; Anthony Harrow (USA), 72	(United States)	Daisy, Cheoy Lee Offshore 31		
Cowes-Cherbourg Race	Royal Ocean Racing Club	17 June 2011	Chris Reddish (GBR), 46	(United Kingdom)	Lion, Reflex 38		
Chicago-Mackinac Race	Chicago Yacht Club	17 July 2011	Mark Morley (USA), 51; Suzanne Bickel (USA), 41	(United States)	WingNuts, Kiwi 35	head injuries during capsize	
Farallones Race	San Francisco Yacht Club	14 April 2012	Alexis Busch (USA); Jordan Fromm (USA); Alan Cahill (USA); Elmer Morrissey (IRL); Marc Kasanin (USA)	(United States)	Low Speed Chase, Sydney 38	Capsize killed 5 from crew of 8, near a rocky coast.	
Newport (Calif.) to Ensenada (Mexico) yacht race		28 April 2012	Theo Mavromatis (USA), 49 Kevin Eric Rudolph (USA), 53; William Reed Johnson Jr. (USA), 57; Joseph Lester Stewart (USA), 64	(United States)	Aegean, Hunter 376	nighttime crash into a rocky island	
Islands Race	Newport Harbor and San Diego Yacht Club	9 March 2013	Craig Thomas Williams (USA), 36	(United States)	Uncontrollable Urge, Columbia 32 Carbon		
Chicago-Mackinac Race	Chicago Yacht Club	21 July 2018	Jon Santarelli (USA), 53	(United States)	Imedi, TP52	overboard resulting from wave strike	
2024 Sydney to Hobart Yacht Race	Cruising Yacht Club of Australia	26 December 2024	Roy Quaden (AUS), 55	(Australia)	Flying Fish Arctos	hit by boom	
2024 Sydney to Hobart Yacht Race	Cruising Yacht Club of Australia	26 December 2024	Nick Smith (AUS), 65	(Australia)	Bowline	hit by mainsheet	

== Deaths during yacht races ==
Race Name	Host Club	Date	Name	Place	Boat	Description	Ref.
Big Boat Series	St. Francis Yacht Club	18 September 1994	Larry Klein (USA), 42	(United States) San Francisco	Twin Flyer, 38 foot sloop		
Commodore Perry Race	North Cape Yacht Club	3 June 2007	Bruce Goldsmith (USA), 71	Lake Erie	J/29	Boom head injury	
America's Cup Testing	Golden Gate Yacht Club	9 May 2013	Andrew Simpson (GBR)	(United States) San Francisco	Artemis Racing, AC72, Boat 1	Entrapped after the boat broke apart and capsized.	
Antigua Superyacht		8 March 2022	Sam Richmond (GBR), 38	Antigua	102 ft S/Y Farfalla	Training incident with rigging failure causing a head Injury	
