= Commodore Clark =

Commodore Clark may refer to:

- Sheldon Clark, Commodore of the Chicago Yacht Club
- Edward Walter Clark, Commodore of the Philadelphia Corinthian Yacht Club

== See also ==
- Clark (surname)
