= Outer Drive Bridge =

Bascule bridge in Chicago, Illinois

Outer Drive Franklin Delano Roosevelt Memorial Bridge
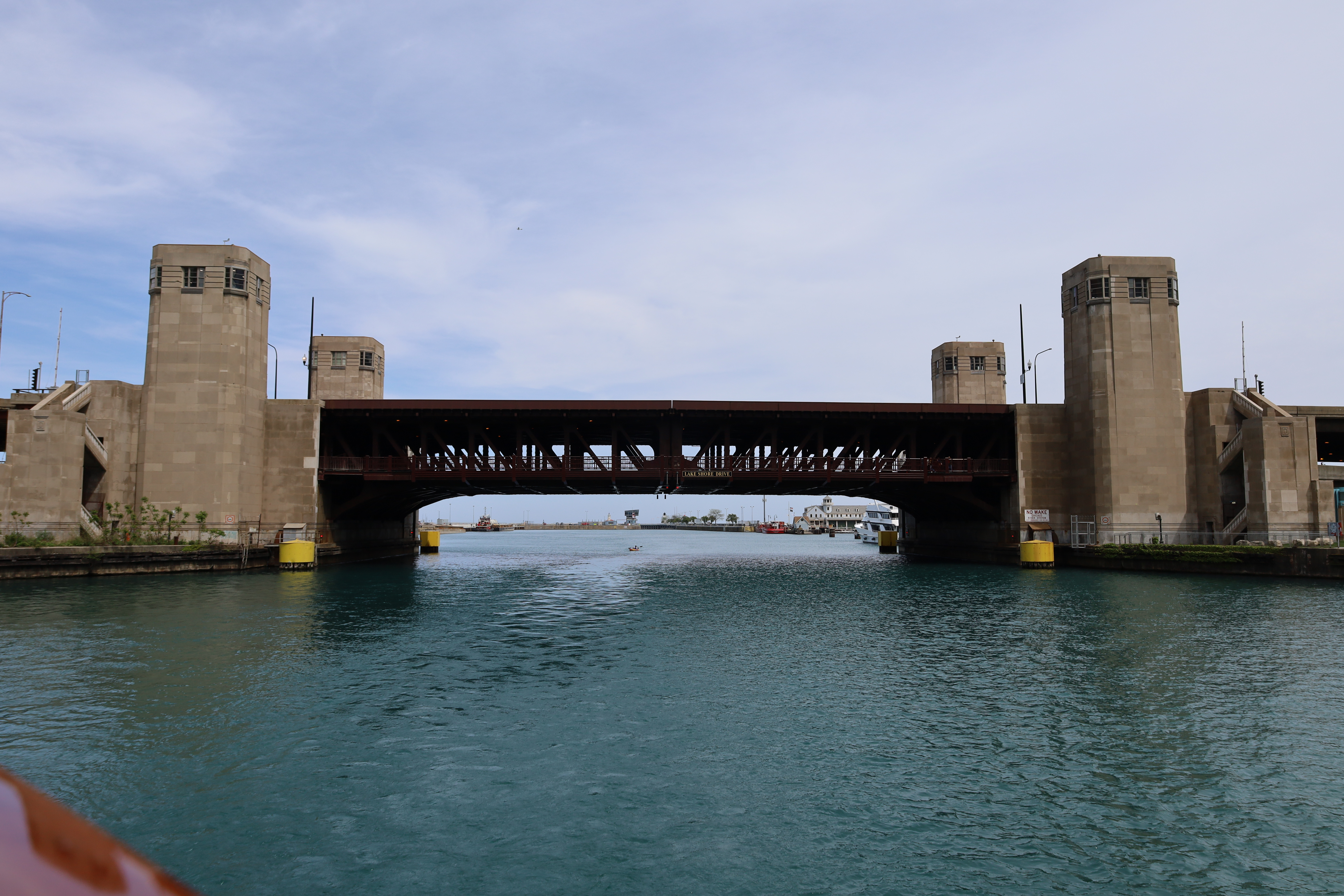
- The bridge in 2023
- Coordinates: 41°53′18.3″N 87°36′50.6″W
- Carries: Motor vehicles, cyclists, pedestrians on Chicago Lakefront Trail and Lake Shore Drive
- Crosses: Chicago River
- Locale: Chicago
- Official name: Franklin Delano Roosevelt Memorial Bridge
- Named for: Centennial anniversary of Franklin D. Roosevelt's birth
- Owner: City of Chicago
- Maintained by: Chicago Department of Transportation
- ID number: 16603027328
- Preceded by: Chicago Harbor Lock
- Followed by: Columbus Drive (William P. Fahey) Bridge

Characteristics
- Design: Double-leaf, double-deck, fixed counterweight, trunnion bascule bridge
- Material: Steel
- Total length: 356 feet (109 m)
- Width: 80.7 feet (24.6 m)
- Longest span: 264 feet (80 m)
- No. of spans: 1 main span and 3 approach spans

History
- Designer: Joseph Strauss
- Engineering design by: City of Chicago
- Constructed by: Ketler-Elliott Company
- Construction start: 1929
- Construction end: 1937
- Inaugurated: 5 October 1937
- Rebuilt: 1987

Location
- Interactive map of Outer Drive

The Outer Drive Bridge, also known as the Link Bridge, is a double-deck bascule bridge carrying DuSable Lake Shore Drive across the Chicago River in Chicago, Illinois, United States. Construction was started in 1929 and was completed in 1937 as one of the Public Works Administration's infrastructure projects in Chicago. Completion of the bridge tied the north and south sections of the "outer" shore roadway, now called DuSable Lake Shore Drive, together. The bridge was officially named the Franklin Delano Roosevelt Memorial Bridge in 1982 to honor the centennial anniversary of the birth of Franklin Delano Roosevelt. It was planned by the Chicago Plan Commission using Hugh E. Young as the consulting engineer, designed by the Strauss Engineering Company, built by the American Bridge Company, and erected by Ketler and Elliot Company. It crosses near the mouth of the Chicago River.

== Significance and purpose ==
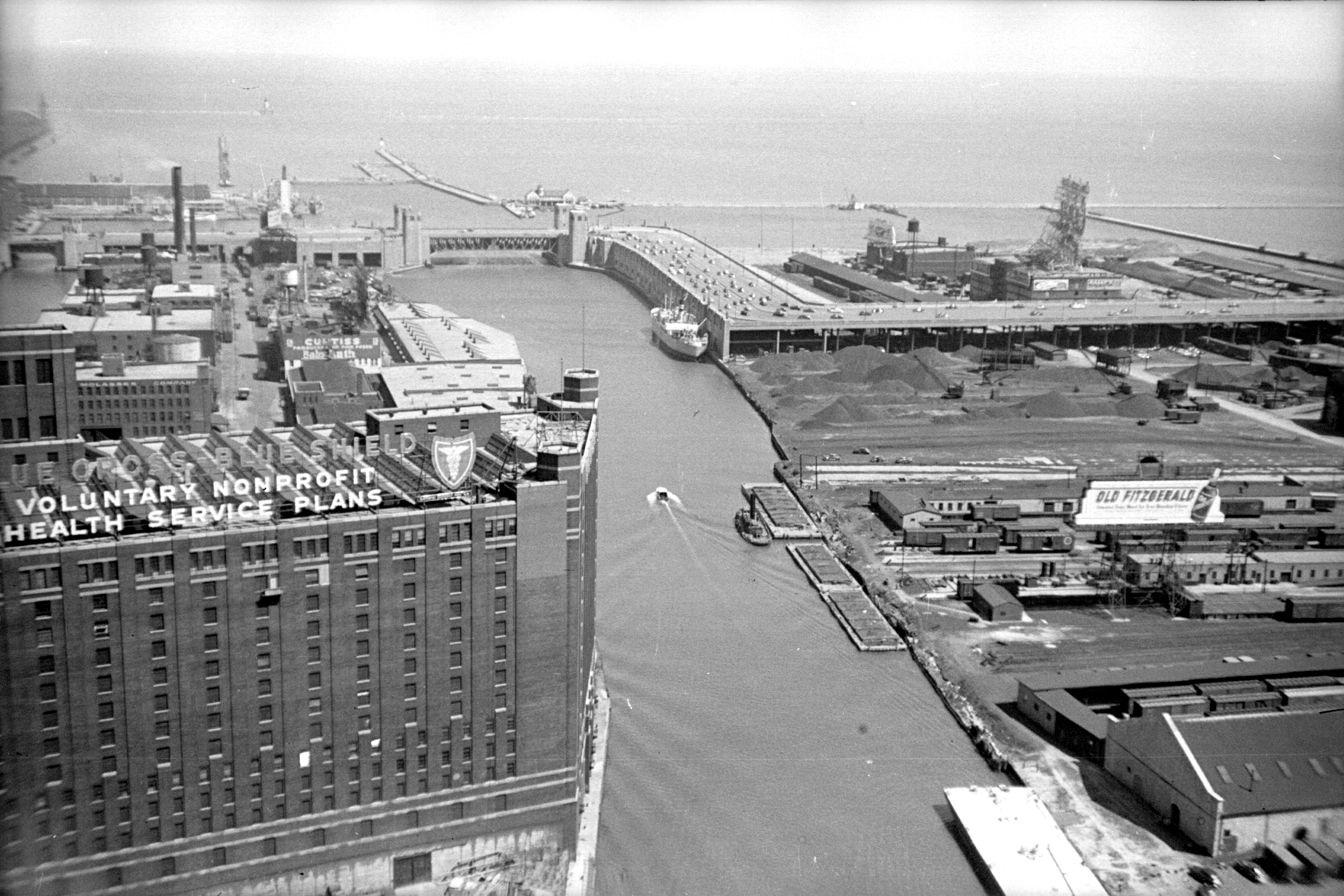
The bridge in 1950

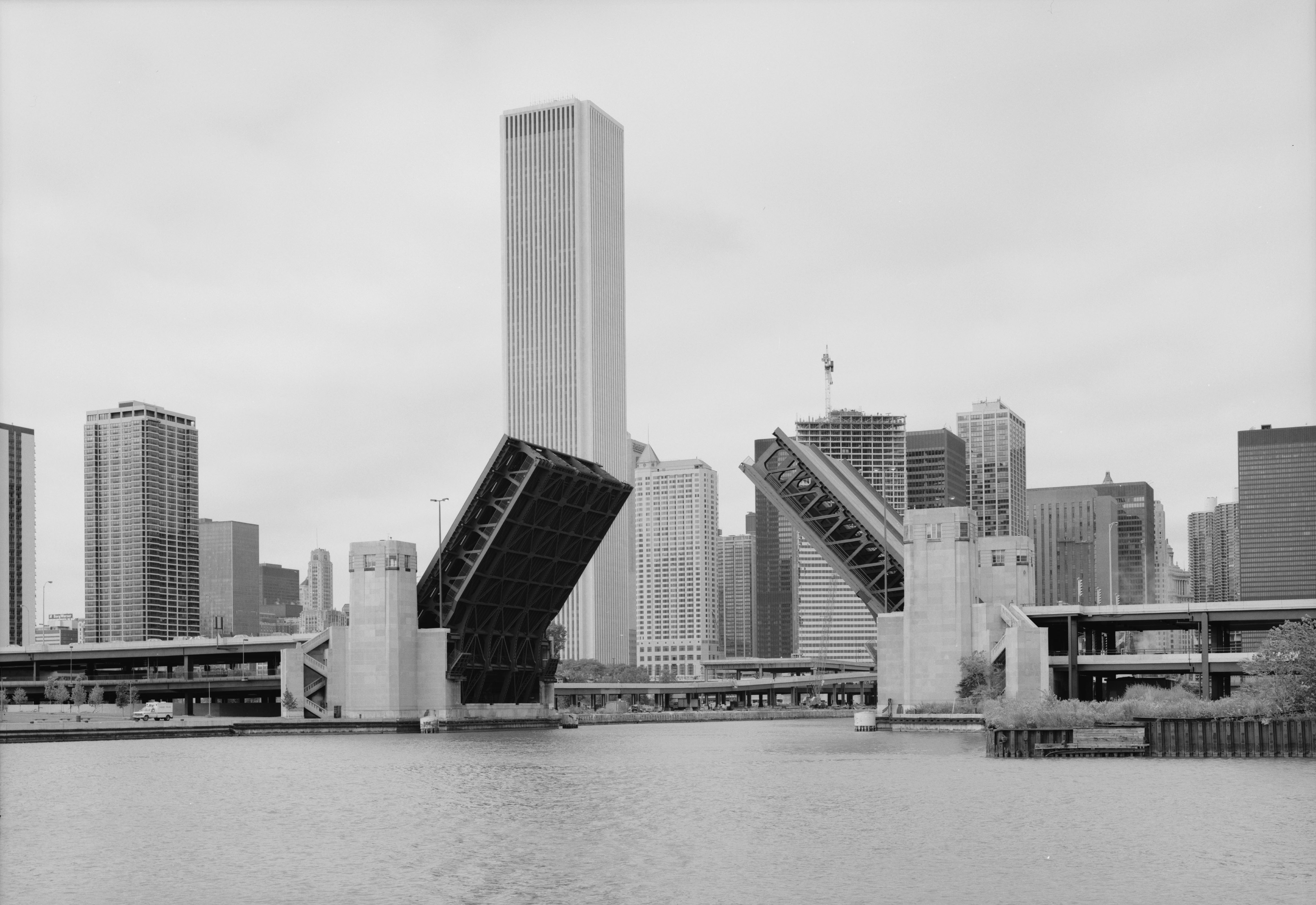
The bridge in 1987

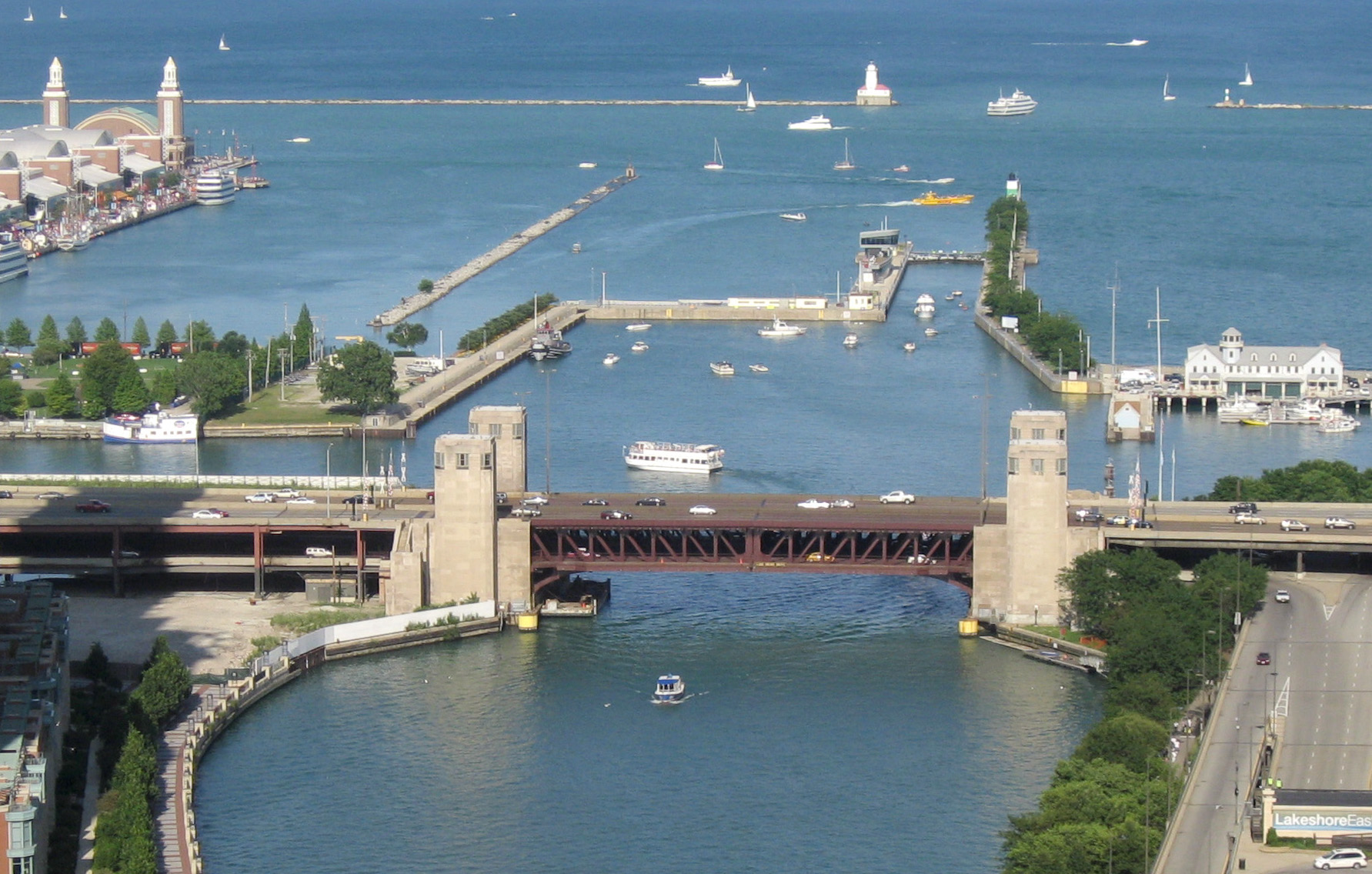
View of bridge towards the Chicago Harbor Lock and Lake Michigan

This bridge, a public works project during the Great Depression, was designed to ease traffic flow on Michigan Avenue and in the Loop. At its completion in 1937, the structure was touted as the longest, widest, and heaviest bascule bridge in the world. The Outer Drive itself, now known as DuSable Lake Shore Drive, links the south side to the north side of the city, running along the western shore of Lake Michigan. It extends from its origin in Jackson Park on the South Side of the city to the Loop, across this Outer Drive Bridge over the Chicago River, to its eventual terminus at Hollywood Avenue and Sheridan Road in Edgewater on the city's North Side.

== Funds ==
While the completion of the Outer Drive was considered one of the most important projects in the PWA it took many years to complete. A main issue was funding. Due to a lack of provided security by Chicago Park Districts, the allotment for the bridge was revoked until the districts were all in position to comply. The total cost of the Outer Drive is estimated at $11,563,000.

== Economic justification ==
Calculations based on a traffic flow of 40,000 vehicles per day on a saving of eight minutes between Oak Street and Seventh Street, made possible by the use of the bridge rather than Michigan Avenue. The delay cost estimated to be one cent per car per minute (60 cents per hour for the value of time or the value of fuel saved) resulted in a savings in vehicle operation of $584,000 per annum; that amount capitalized at 5% would indicate that $23,360,000 could properly be spent to eliminate this delay, in the eyes of the decision makers at the time of the construction. From the perspective of engineering economics, this savings calculation justified the Outer Drive bridge project, showing a possible saving of $11,797,000.

== Bridge operation ==
According to Engineering News-Record, "Each leaf is to be operated by two sets of gear trains, consisting of four sets of gear reductions. Each gear train is connected to two 100-horsepower main operating motors, only one of which is to be used at a time. The time required for opening or closing the bridge against a 28-mile-per-hour (45 km/h) wind is stated to be 57.6 seconds, of which 10 seconds is for acceleration and 2.86 seconds for deceleration. The main operating racks are bolted to the underside of the outside trusses, the pitch radius being 20 feet (6.1 m). The operating pinion, with a pitch diameter of 40 inches (100 cm), is mounted on a shaft of the gear train.

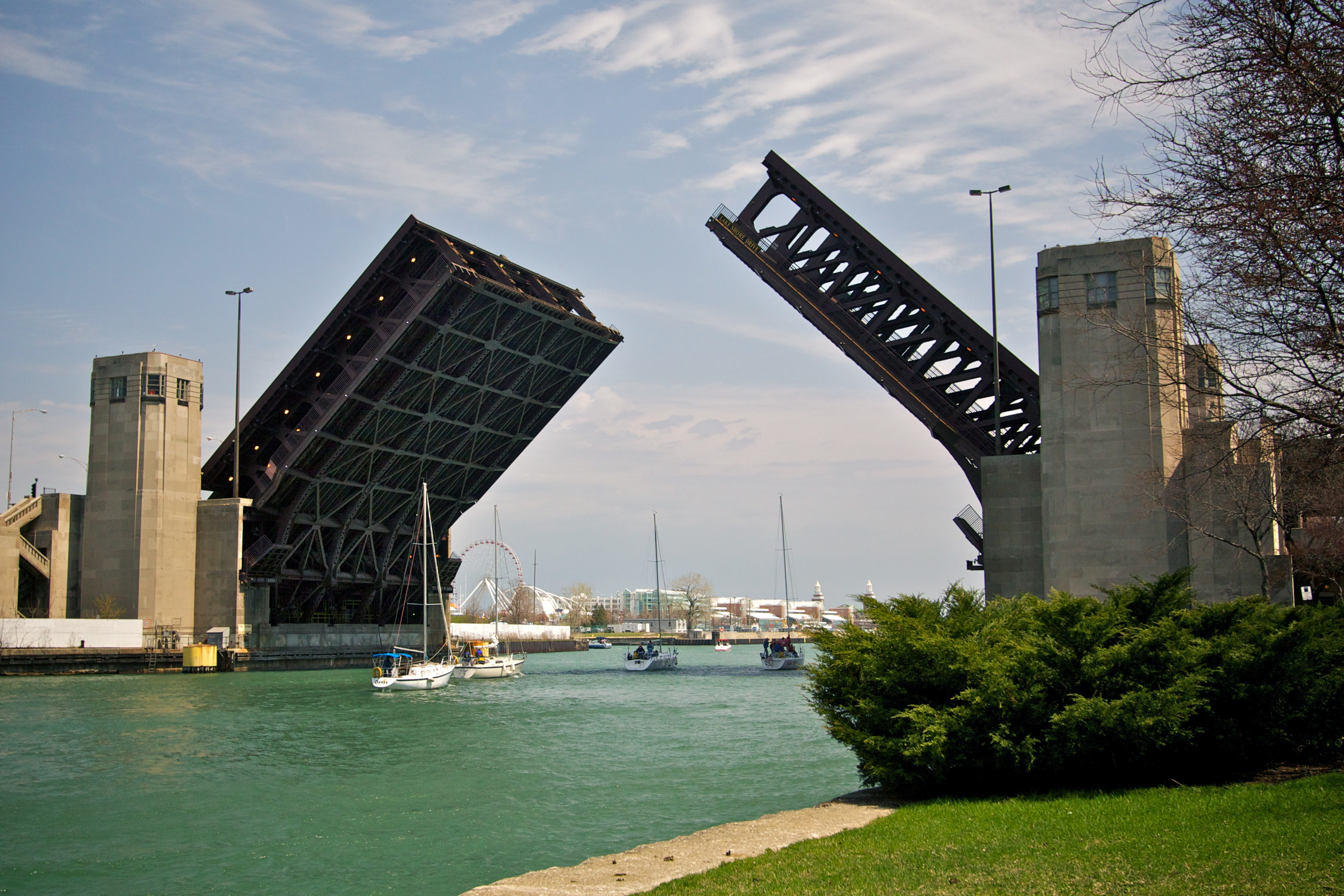
Bridge raised for sailboats, viewed looking east, toward Navy Pier

Heavy locking devices are provided at the center of the bridge and at the rigid in its closed position. The center lock in addition to holding the leaves together in their closed position, also transmits live load shear from one leaf to the other. This center lock consists of a set of four female castings bolted to the river end of one leaf, and a second set of four male units bolted to the river end of the other leaf, all castings being on the centerlines of the trusses. The male unit consists of two castings forming a toggle.

Heel or rear locks are necessary to prevent the leaves from opening when live loads pass over the part of the bridge between the trunnions and the rear break in the floor. Each leaf is provided with two pairs of rear locks, each pair being placed between the inside and outside trusses. The four locks of a leaf are connected by shafting, and operation by means of two 15-horsepower motors set either side of the centerline of the bridge" (April 22, 1937).

== See also ==
- List of bridges documented by the Historic American Engineering Record in Illinois
- Quarantine Speech
