= Quarantine Speech =

1937 speech by U.S. President Franklin D. Roosevelt

The Quarantine Speech was a speech given by U.S. President Franklin D. Roosevelt in Chicago on October 5, 1937. The speech called for an international "quarantine" against the spread of the "epidemic of world lawlessness" by aggressive nations as an alternative to the political climate of American neutrality and non-intervention that was prevalent at the time. No countries were directly mentioned in the speech, although it was interpreted as referring to the Empire of Japan, the Kingdom of Italy, and Nazi Germany. Roosevelt suggested the use of economic pressure, a forceful response, but less direct than outright aggression. The speech was given at the dedication of the Outer Drive Bridge between north and south outer Lake Shore Drive. The speech received backlash for its interventionist ideals, causing protest from non-interventionists and heightening America's isolationist sentiments.

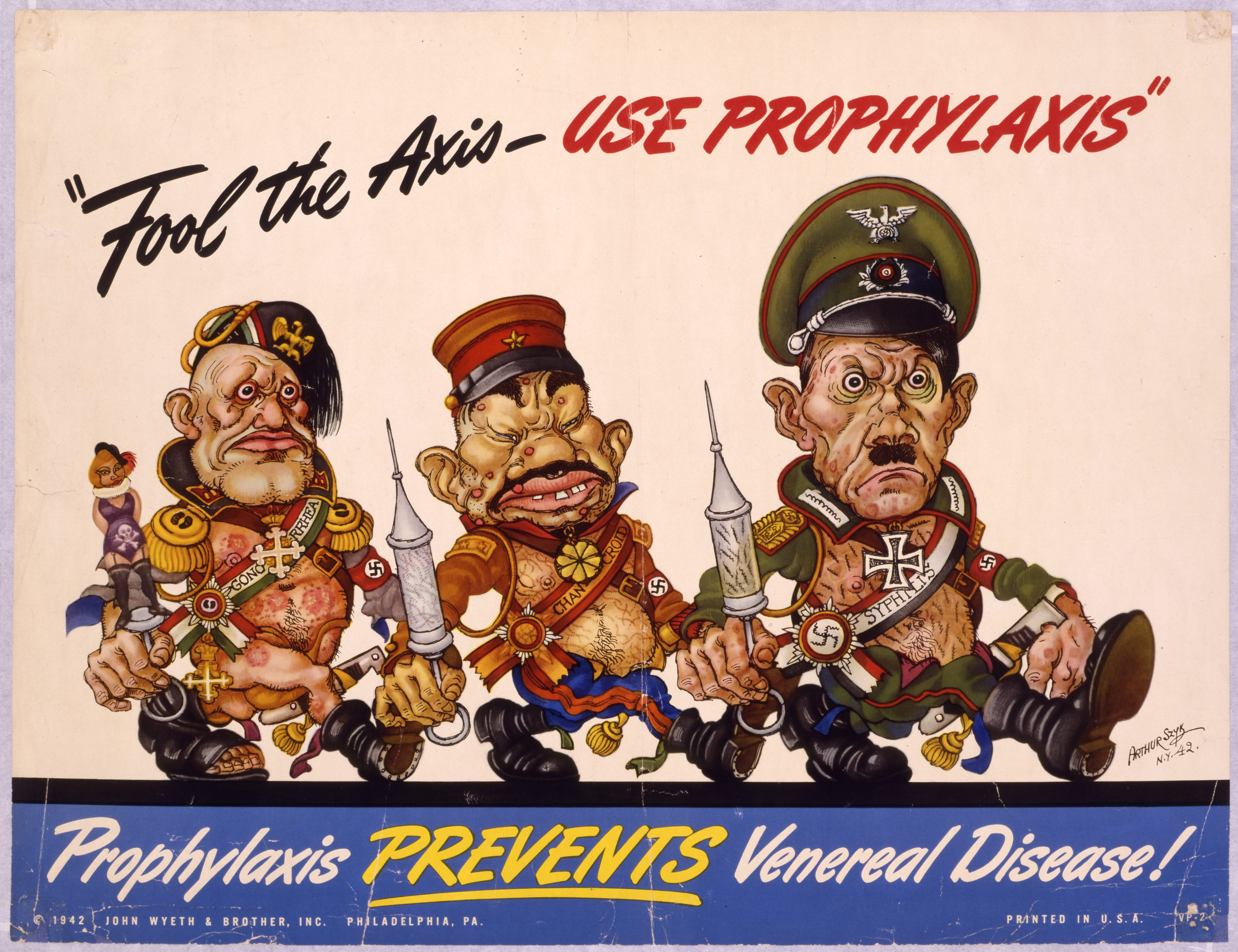
Arthur Szyk used the metaphor in a 1942 campaign against sexually transmitted diseases among GIs; Mussolini, Tojo, and Hitler are caricatured in an advanced state of illness.

Public response to the speech was mixed. Famed cartoonist Percy Crosby, creator of Skippy and very outspoken Roosevelt critic, bought a two-page advertisement in the New York Sun to attack it. In addition, it was heavily criticized by Hearst-owned newspapers and Robert R. McCormick of the Chicago Tribune, but several subsequent compendia of editorials showed overall approval in US media.

Roosevelt realized the impact that those writing in favor of isolationism had on the nation. He hoped that the storm isolationists had created would fade away and allow the general public to become educated and even active in international policy. However, this was not the response that grew over time, with the controversy eventually intensifying isolationism views in more Americans. Roosevelt even mentioned in two personal letters written on October 16, 1937, that "he was 'fighting against a public psychology which comes very close to saying 'peace at any price.'" Disappointed in how the public reacted to the speech, Roosevelt decided to take a step back with regard to his foreign policy, even to the point of accepting an apology from Japan after the sinking of the USS Panay.

== See also ==
- Presidency of Franklin D. Roosevelt
- Midway - This film features the Quarantine Speech being played over the opening credits.
