= Chicago Harbor Light =

Lighthouse in Chicago, Illinois

Chicago Harbor Light The Chicago Harbor Lighthouse
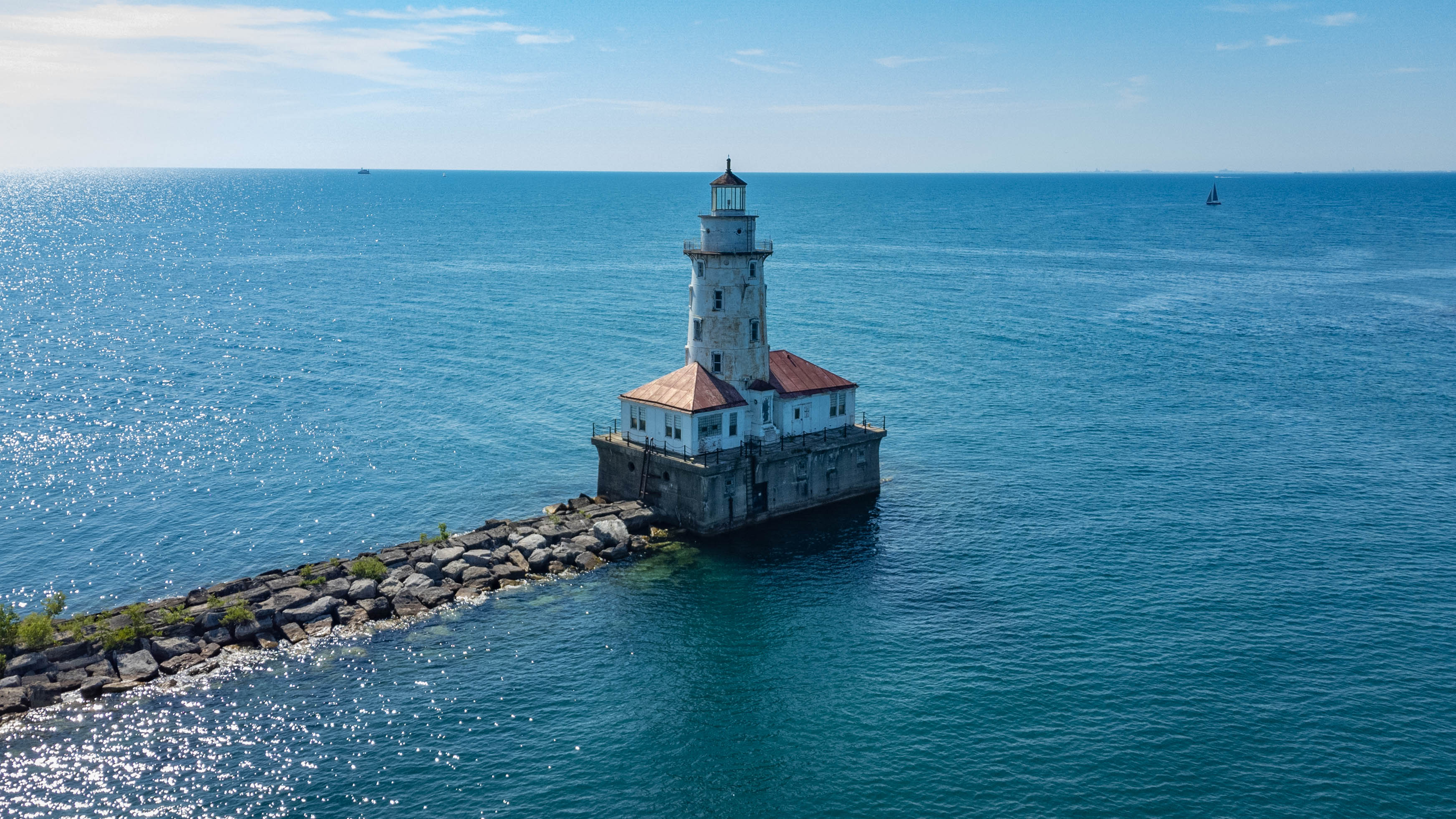
- The lighthouse in 2022
- Location: Chicago, Illinois
- Coordinates: 41°53′22″N 87°35′26″W

Tower
- Constructed: 1893, moved 1919
- Foundation: Rubble stone with concrete pier
- Construction: Brick, cast iron and glass
- Automated: 1979
- Height: 66 ft (20 m)
- Shape: Cylindrical base/Frustum of a cone tower, with attached buildings
- Markings: White, red on roofs
- Heritage: National Register of Historic Places listed place, Chicago Landmark

Light
- First lit: 1893
- Focal height: 82 feet (25 m)
- Lens: Third-order Fresnel
- Range: 24 miles (39 km)
- Characteristic: Fl R 5s floodlighted. Apr. to Dec. Horn: 2 blasts ev 30 s (1 s bl). Operates from April to Dec
- Chicago Harbor Lighthouse
- U.S. National Register of Historic Places
- Chicago Landmark
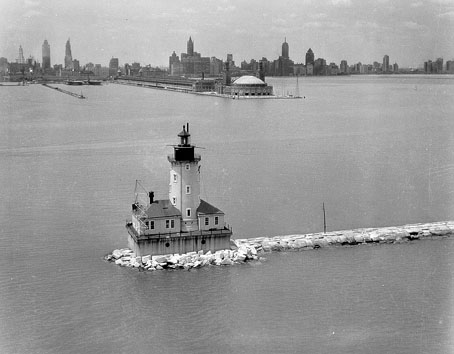
- 1930s U.S. Coast Guard photo of the light
- Location: North Breakwater, Chicago, Illinois
- Area: 1 acre (0.40 ha)
- Built: 1893
- Architect: United States Lighthouse Board
- MPS: U.S. Coast Guard Lighthouses and Light Stations on the Great Lakes TR
- NRHP reference No.: 84000986

Significant dates
- Added to NRHP: July 19, 1984
- Designated CHICL: April 9, 2003

The Chicago Harbor Light, or Chicago Harbor Lighthouse, is an automated active lighthouse, and stands at the south end of the northern breakwater protecting the Chicago Harbor, to the east of Navy Pier and the mouth of the Chicago River.

== History ==
The light was constructed in 1893 for the World's Columbian Exposition and moved to its present site in 1919. The United States Lighthouse Board prominently displayed "its 'state of the art' wares and engineering achievements." Prominently featured was "the engineering marvel" of Spectacle Reef Light and a 111-foot-tall (34 m) skeletal cast iron lighthouse tower.

Also displayed at the Exposition were a number of Fresnel lenses, including a stunning Third Order Fresnel lens which was awarded first prize at a Paris glass exhibition. The lens featured alternating red and white panels, and had been ordered for installation in the New Point Loma Lighthouse in California. The coincidental conclusion of construction of the new Chicago Harbor light and the close of the Exhibition prompted the Lighthouse Board to keep the lens in Chicago, and thus the lens was installed in the lantern room of the new tower. The original lens has since been removed, and is now on display at Cabrillo National Monument in California.

Surrounded by rip rap, the structure has several levels: a concrete base and two red roofed buildings with a tapered white cylinder between them which is topped by a parapet and the light itself.

In 1917 the breakwater was renovated. At that time, the lighthouse was moved to its present site, and its attached fog signal room and boathouse were built.

The design is "unique . . . similar to that of the offshore sparkplug towers, but this tower is taller." Except for the additions made at the time of the move, it "bears some resemblance" to the Rock of Ages Light near Isle Royale on Lake Superior, which is its contemporary.

The lighthouse was listed on the National Register of Historic Places on July 19, 1984, and later was designated a Chicago Landmark on April 9, 2003.

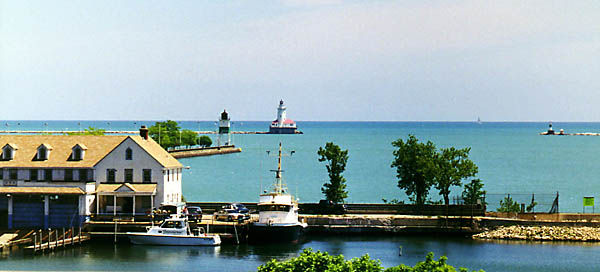
Chicago Breakwater and Pierhead light

In 2005, the light was declared excess by the Coast Guard. It was offered at no cost to eligible entities, including federal, state, and local agencies, non-profit corporations, and educational organizations under the provisions of the National Historic Lighthouse Preservation Act of 2000. After an unusually long delay, United States Secretary of the Interior Kenneth Salazar initiated transfer to the City of Chicago on February 24, 2009. The city had designated the lighthouse a Chicago Landmark on April 9, 2003.

The Lighthouse's "significant role in the development of Chicago" is commemorated in a relief sculpture, entitled The Spirit of the Waters located near the LaSalle Street entrance of Chicago City Hall.

== Preservation efforts ==
In March 2022, Friends of the Chicago Harbor Lighthouse (FOCHL), a 501(c)(3) not-for-profit charity was formed with the mission to preserve, restore and celebrate the Chicago Harbor Lighthouse. In December of 2023, FOCHL submitted an application to the National Park Service for transfer of ownership of the lighthouse from the City of Chicago to the non-profit.

== Views of the light ==
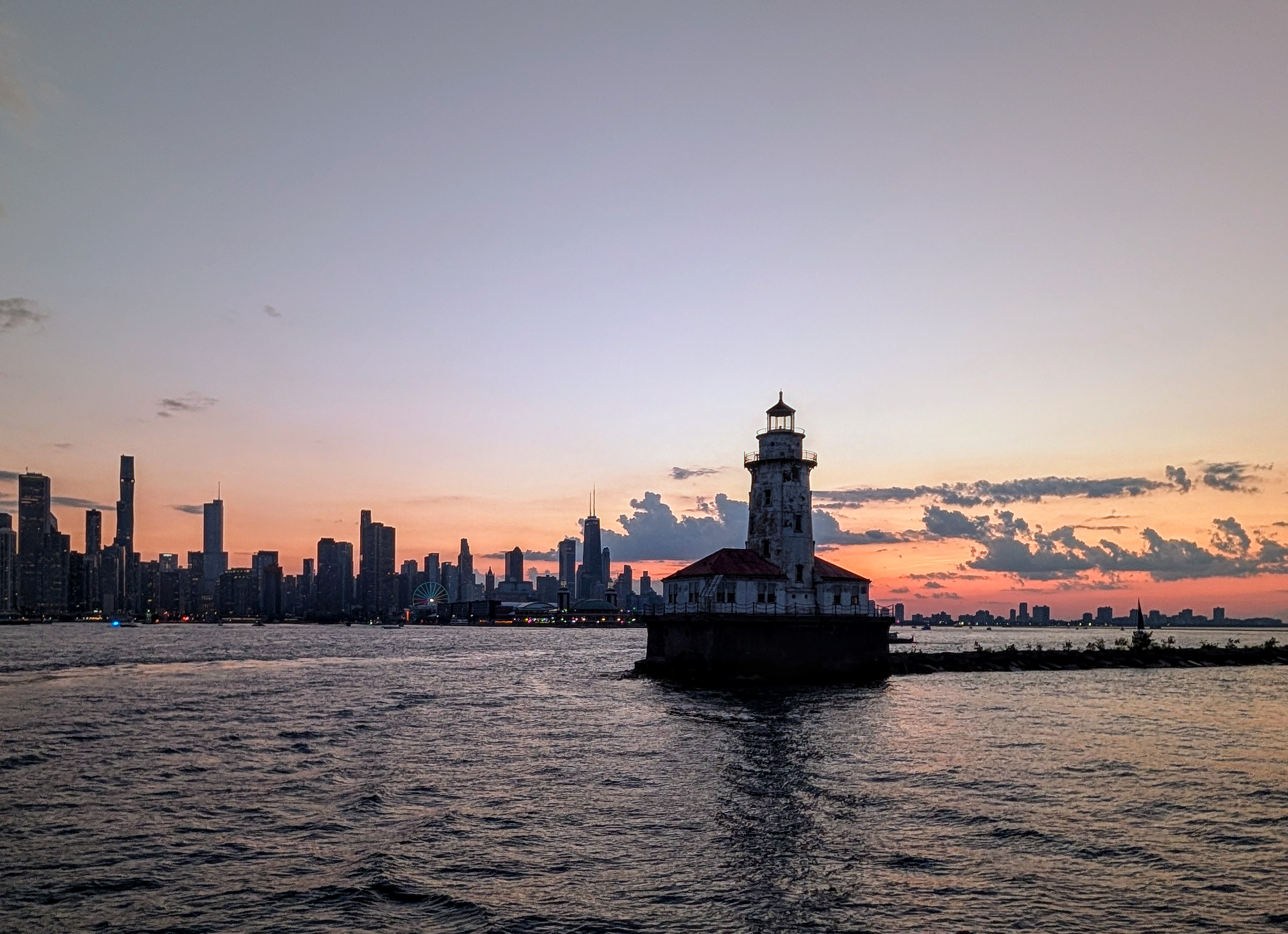
The Chicago Harbor Lighthouse at dusk, with the north Chicago skyline, from a Wednesday fireworks boat tour

The light is an active aid to navigation, and no access is permitted.

A good view of the lighthouse may be had from Navy Pier, especially at the end of the pier. Better views can be had by boat, including the various tour boats in the area.
