= Sheldon Clark =

American businessman

Sheldon Clark (August 29, 1876 – August 15, 1952) was a noted business, civic, and sports leader. He was chairman of the board of the Sinclair Refining Company and Commodore of the Chicago Yacht Club (for which he held "Membership #1"). A lifelong yachtsman, he sailed in the America's Cup races with Sir Thomas Lipton and in many Chicago-to-Mackinac races, aboard his yacht, Rainbow.

Mr. Clark was born in Chicago, the son of Sheldon A. and Nannie Kelly Clark. He attended the University of Colorado and then went into the first of two business careers, as a law book publishing executive with Callaghan and Company, starting as a salesman and quickly becoming secretary, vice-president, and general manager. In 1916 when the old Cudahy Refining Company was acquired by Sinclair, he left Callaghan and joined Sinclair, becoming a pioneer in the new oil industry. Active in Sinclair's operating and expansion programs, he bought for Sinclair the site for the company's major refinery in East Chicago, Indiana. He is credited with conceiving the idea of modern gas stations, which he named "service stations." In 1927, he was charged with jury-fixing in the Fall-Sinclair oil conspiracy trial. However, he was absolved of all charges.

Mr. Clark was involved in many Chicago-based and national civic and sporting causes. He was a judge in the Long Count Fight at Soldier Field in Chicago in 1927. In 1929, he was elected president of the Chicago Stadium Corporation. He was head of the Sporting Club of Illinois. He was elected Commodore of the Yachtsman's Association of America in 1934. His speedboat, Miss Chicago, held the world record for single engine hydroplanes, reaching the speed of 72 miles per hour. He served as chairman of the Illinois Athletic Commission from 1941 through 1948. He was involved in Republican politics (and was frequently urged to run for Mayor of Chicago and Governor of Illinois). He served on the executive board of the Boy Scouts of America, including being named as national commodore of the Sea Scouts. He was founder and first president of the Illinois Council of the Navy League and later was elected president of the Navy League of the United States in 1940.

He died on August 15, 1952.
