= Chicago Yacht Club =

Yacht club in Chicago, Illinois, United States

- Burgee
- Short name: CYC
- Founded: 1875; 151 years ago
- Location: Chicago United States
- Commodore: Laura Sigmond
- Focus: To encourage, promote, and develop knowledge, participation, and enjoyment of all aspects of yachting.
- Website: www.chicagoyachtclub.org

The Chicago Yacht Club is located in Chicago, Illinois. "CYC" is well known as being the Organizing Authority for the Chicago Yacht Club Race to Mackinac held each July. CYC also organizes dozens of other sailboat races and regattas throughout the boating season, which is usually considered May 1 to October 31 in the Chicago area. CYC has two club houses or stations, one at Monroe Harbor and one at Belmont Harbor.

== History ==
The Chicago Yacht Club was founded in 1875 to encourage and promote the sport of yachting. In 1898, the first Race to Mackinac was held. In 1900, the club obtained its first clubhouse, the Argo clubhouse located at the Illinois Central Pier #3.

Chicago Yacht Club's original Chicago to Mackinac Trophy dates to 1906. The trophy has been awarded annually since 1921. Although the Chicago to Mackinac races were skipped in 1917–1920 due to World War I, they were sailed every year of World War II. In 1920, the Lincoln Park Yacht Club, which had helped start the Canada's Cup, combined with the Chicago Club.

In 1955, construction began of the current Monroe Harbor Station, one of two clubhouses maintained by the club. The other clubhouse (41.9406°N 87.6352°W) is located in Belmont Harbor and is host to the club's One-Design sailing fleet and extensive sailing school.

Among those who have sailed for the club is Robert Halperin, Richard Stearns and William Parks who won an Olympic bronze medal in 1960. Halperin also won a Pan American Games gold medal in 1963 in yachting, and was also a football player at Notre Dame, Wisconsin, and in the NFL, one of Chicago's most-decorated World War II heroes, and Chairman of Commercial Light Co.

As part of the club's centennial celebrations in 1975, Richard and Wendy Van Mell edited The First hundred years : a history of the Chicago Yacht Club, 1875–1975.

The Club competed for the America's Cup in the 1987 Louis Vuitton Cup, represented by the Heart of America boat, skippered by Buddy Melges. The club's entry finished 8th of 13 boats in the competition to determine the cup competitor. The presentation of a challenge from a Lake Michigan yacht club, required adjudication of whether the lake was an "arm of the sea", as required by the Deed of Gift of the America's Cup and the decision allowed Great Lakes boats to compete.

== Activities ==
Chicago Yacht Club hosts a series of on the water events throughout the boating season.

In June, the club hosts the SAILING WORLD Magazine's National Offshore One Design (NOOD) Regatta which draws several hundred competitors from around North America.

Each July, the club hosts the Chicago Yacht Club Race to Mackinac, one of the longest running fresh-water sailing races in the world. The race starts from just off the Chicago Harbor Lighthouse, continues up the length of Lake Michigan and finishes on Mackinac Island off the round island lighthouse.

Another signature event is the annual VERVE Cup regatta held each August. The "Verve" hosts both an inshore event and an offshore event and attracts the top sailors in the country.

Chicago Yacht Club is a leader in teaching children and adults to sail, teaching sailing lessons for over 84 years.

== Commodore ==
- Charles Anderson (2024-2025)
- Lisa Curcio Gaston (2023)
- Nick Berberian (2021-2022)
- Louis Sandoval (2019-2020 )
- Leif Sigmond (2017–2018)
- Gregory Miarecki (2015–2016)
- Gerald Bober (2013–2014)
- Joseph Haas (2011–2012)
- Sheldon Clark
