= Port of Chicago =

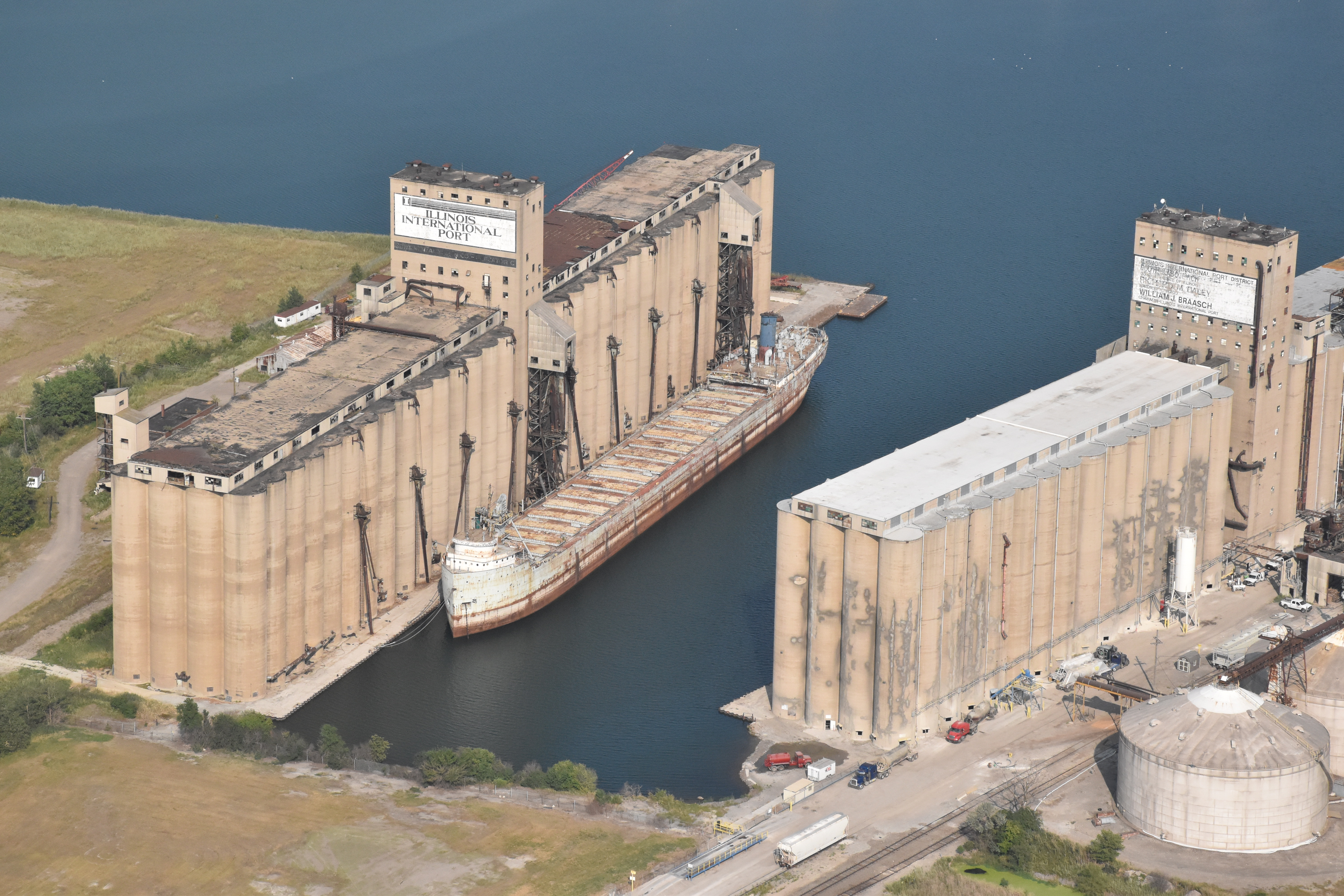
- Aerial view of the Port of Chicago; former freighter C.T.C. No. 1 is visible in dock
- Interactive map of Port of Chicago

Location
- Country: United States
- Location: Chicago, Illinois
- Coordinates: 41.733°N 87.528°W

Details
- Opened: 1959
- Executive Director: Erik Varela
- Port Manager: Maria Limonciello
- Director of Facilities and Maintenance: Luke McWilliams

Statistics
- Annual cargo tonnage: 894,832
- Website www.iipd.com

The Port of Chicago consists of several major port facilities on Lake Michigan within the city of Chicago, Illinois, operated by the Illinois International Port District (formerly known as the Chicago Regional Port District). It is a multimodal facility featuring Senator Dan Dougherty Harbor (Lake Calumet), the Iroquois Landing Lakefront Terminus, and Harborside International Golf Center. The central element of the Port District, Calumet Harbor, is maintained by the U.S. Army Corps of Engineers.

The modern Port of Chicago links inland canal and river systems in the Midwestern United States to the Great Lakes, giving the global shipping market access to the St. Lawrence Seaway and linking the Atlantic Ocean to the Gulf of Mexico by way of the Illinois Waterway and the Mississippi River.

== History ==
In 1951, the Illinois General Assembly authorized the creation of port districts in Illinois with the Chicago Regional Port District, to oversee harbor and port development, being the first such port district created. The State of Illinois and City of Chicago had relinquished all rights and interest in the bed of Lake Calumet to the Port District, so as to enable the District to develop Calumet Harbor. The district was given the power to acquire any navigable waters of the state which were within the District area. The constitutionality of the district was challenged in People v. Chicago Regional Port District. The plaintiffs, later the appellants, challenged the district on the grounds that the sale or lease of navigable waters by the State was prohibited and the State did not have the ability to establish special corporations. In 1954, the Illinois Supreme Court rejected the appellants’ claim to possess constitutional standing with respect to the elements claimed as grounds.

In 1985, the Illinois International Port District was created by the Illinois International Port District Act as a political subdivision to run the Port of Chicago.

=== C.T.C. No. 1 ===
C.T.C. No. 1 is a 620-foot-long cargo hauler brought to the south Chicago ports in 1982. With a capacity of 16,300 tons, this ship was used for the storage and transfer of cement until its termination in 2009. The ship hasn't moved since its termination and then purchase by the Grand River Navigation Co., Traverse City, MI.

== Port Commerce & Foreign Trade Zone No. 22 ==
Illinois International Port District is responsible for Foreign Trade Zone No. 22. This zone spans 8 counties: Cook, DuPage, Grundy, Kankakee, Kendall, Lake, and Will Counties as well as portions of McHenry and Kane Counties. Around the Calumet zone the district maintains 20 acres of land for future developments as well as 400,000 square feet of warehouse space. At the mouth of the Calumet River is the Iroquois Landing Lakefront Terminus, this Area is utilized as Shipping container processing and storage space. The terminal currently handles 190 acres (0.77 km^{2}) of paved concrete grounds as well as 3000 feet of boat and barge berths. The Iroquois Terminus is serviced with direct trucking and rail access supported by two transit sheds spanning 100,000 square feet including a 135 railcar staging area. About 6 miles along the Calumet River it feeds into Lake Calumet which contains two grain elevators maintained by the port authority and is reported to have a combined capacity of 14 million bushels, as well as liquid bulk storage of 800,000 barrels.

== Governance ==
The Illinois International Port District Act creates a nine-member board. Four members are appointed by the Governor of Illinois with the advice and consent of the Illinois Senate and five members are appointed by the Mayor of Chicago with the advice and consent of the Chicago City Council. The Illinois International Port District is the only port district in Illinois that may not levy taxes. By statute, the executive director of the IIPD is a member of the Task Force on the Conservation and Quality of the Great Lakes.

Current board members of IIPD
Members	Role	Date Appointed	Term Expiration	Appointment Authority
Bowen, Charles	Member	2/9/2005	Continuing Appointment	Mayor of Chicago (Rahm Emanuel)
Edwards, Averil	Member	8/10/2020	6/1/2025	Governor (J. B. Pritzker)
Meltzer-Cassel, Danielle	Member	11/6/2019	Continuing Appointment	Mayor of Chicago (Lori Lightfoot)
Solis, Ivan	Chair	11/6/2019	Continuing Appointment	Mayor of Chicago (Lori Lightfoot)
Sriraj, P.S.	Vice Chair	8/10/2020	6/1/2025	Governor (J. B. Pritzker)
Sullivan, Terrence	Member	5/11/2015	Continuing Appointment	Governor (J. B. Pritzker)
Wisniewski, Henry V.	Member	7/28/2011	Continuing Appointment	Mayor of Chicago (Rahm Emanuel)
Rodriguez, Erika	Member	04/28/2021	06/01/2025	Mayor of Chicago (Lori Lightfoot)
McClendon, Michelle	Member	10/15/2021	06/01/2027	Governor (J. B. Pritzker)

=== Reform efforts and proposals ===
In 2008, the Chicago Civic Federation proposed the dissolution of the Illinois International Port District. Under their plan, port operations and related lands would transfer to the City of Chicago; transfer of open land to the Forest Preserve District of Cook County; and transfer Harborside International Golf Center to the control of the Chicago Park District.

In July 2013, Chicago Mayor Rahm Emanuel and Governor of Illinois Pat Quinn proposed a privatized revitalization of the Port Facilities and District area. Attempting to strike a deal with Private family-owned International Investment and Management company Broe Group. Negotiation for this revitalization ended on the negotiation table without definitive statement.

During the 100th Illinois General Assembly, Elaine Nekritz filed House Bill 2502 which, if signed into law, would have replaced the district's current governing board with the Chicago City Council. The bill was referred to the Rules Committee and died at the end of the legislative session.

As of 2019, Chicago Metropolitan Agency for Planning (CMAP) is studying the District, Its facilities, and the surrounding area to provide an economic solution for the Port to operate out of the negative.

== Facilities ==
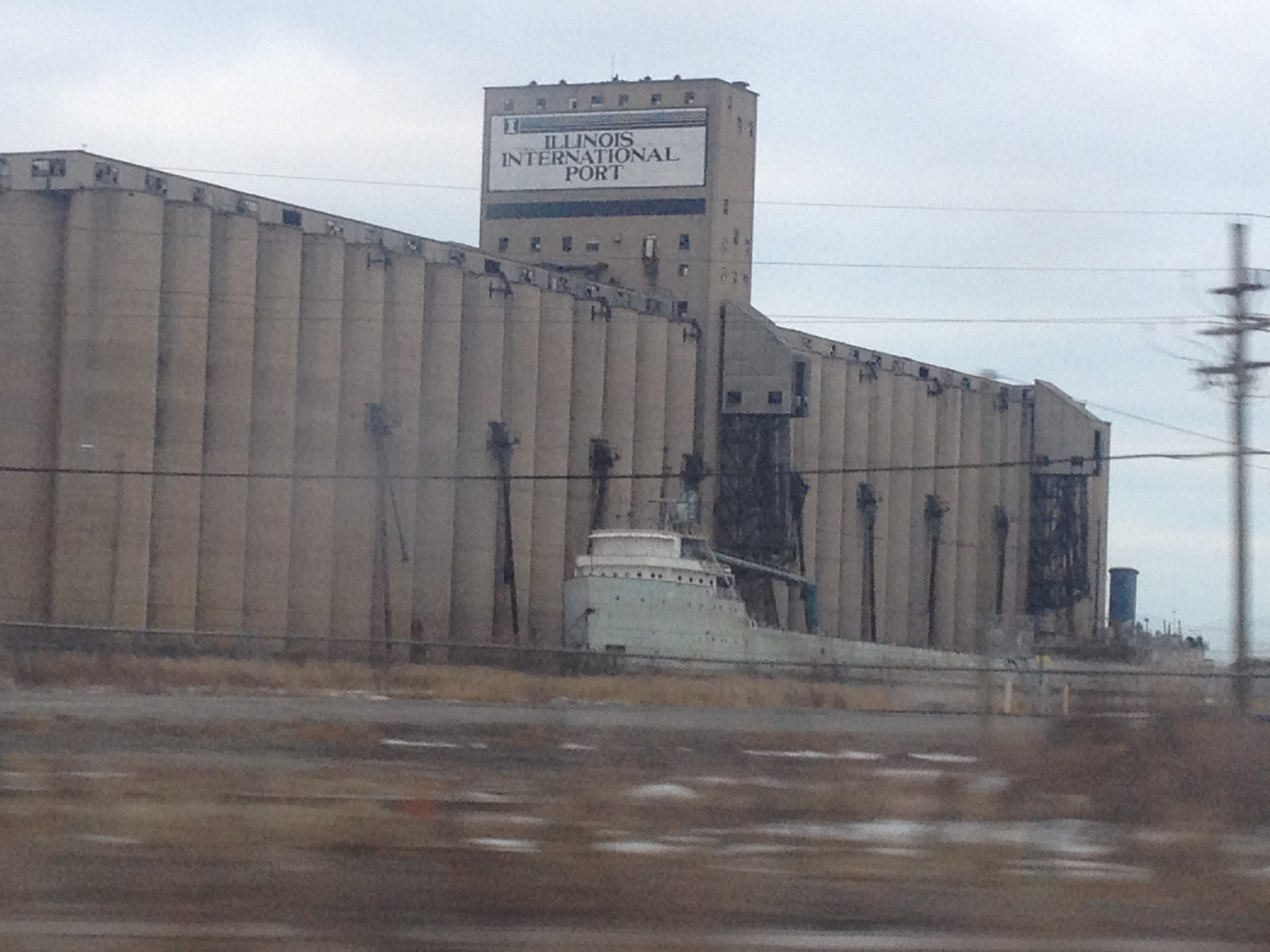
View of the Illinois international port from the Bishop Ford Freeway.

- Iroquois Landing Lakefront Terminal:
  - 190 acres (0.77 km^{2}) of warehouses and facilities.
  - 780,000+ square meters (8.39 million square feet) of storage.
- Lake Calumet terminal:
  - Transit sheds: 29,000 square meters (315,000 square feet).
  - 900+ linear meters (3000 linear feet) of ship and barge berthing.
  - Approximately 1,600 acres.
  - Grain storage: 493,000 metric tons (14 million bushels)
  - Bulk liquid storage: 127 million liters (800,000 barrels)
