= Glen Park (Gary, Indiana) =

- Neighborhood
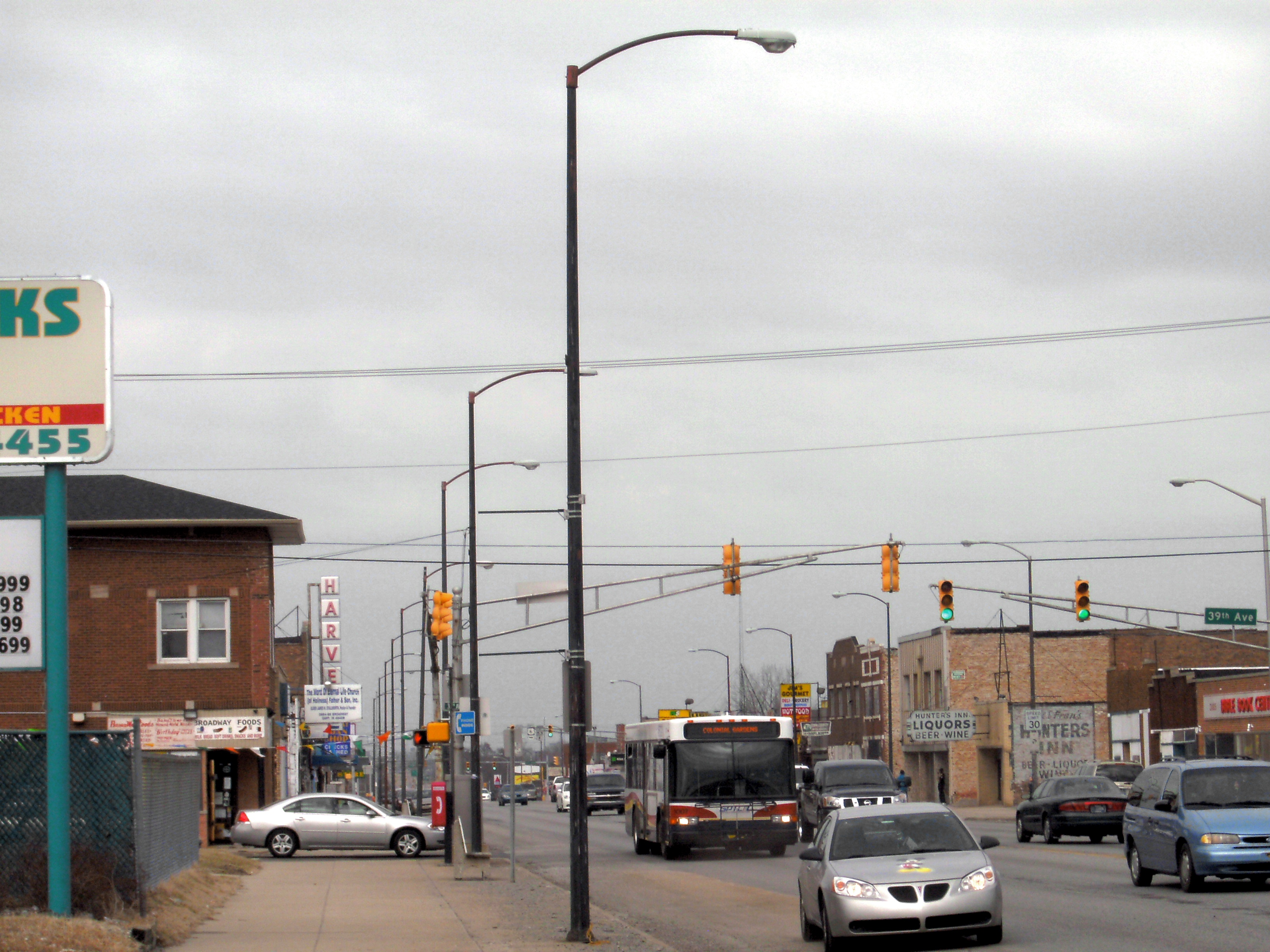
- Intersection of 39th and Broadway

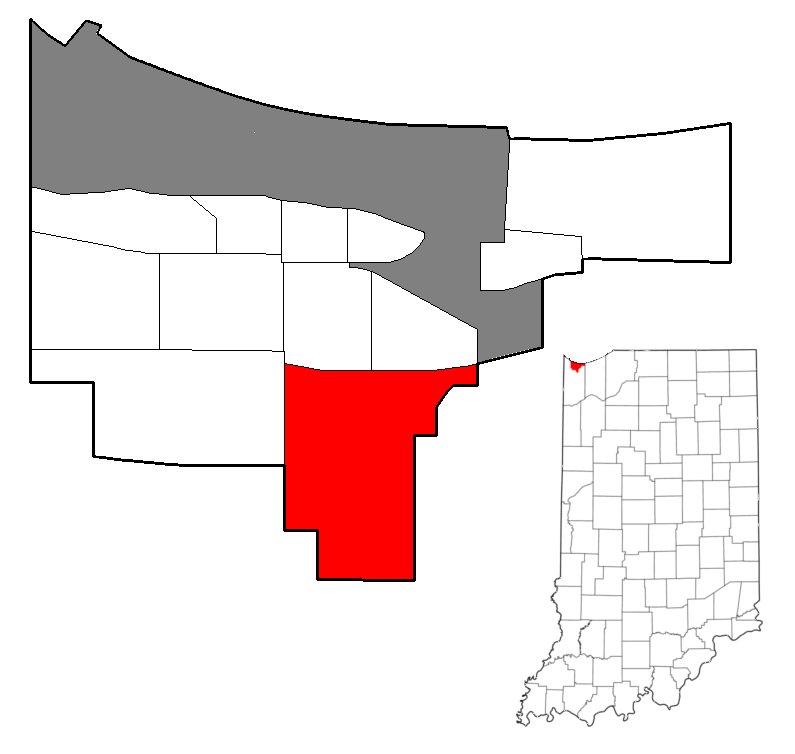
- Location within the city of Gary
- Coordinates: 41.553072°N 87.336509°W
- Country: United States
- State: Indiana
- County: Lake County
- City: Gary
- First settled: 1894
- Annexed by Gary: 1926

Population (2000)
  - Total: 25,454
- Time zone: UTC-6 (CST)
  - Summer (DST): UTC-5 (CDT)
- ZIP code: 46408, 46409
- Area code: 219

Glen Park, also sometimes called University Park, is the most populous neighborhood in Gary, Indiana. It is situated on the city's far south side, south of the Little Calumet River and Borman Expressway. The neighborhood is often divided into Glen Park East and Glen Park West, on the respective sides of Broadway. Within Gary, Glen Park borders on Black Oak to the west and Midtown and Pulaski to the north; beyond Gary, it adjoins Hobart, Merrillville, and unincorporated Calumet Township. As of 2000, the neighborhood had a population of 25,454, approximately a third of Gary's total population. In terms of race, as of 2000 Glen Park was 86% African-American, 9% white, and 5.5% Hispanic.

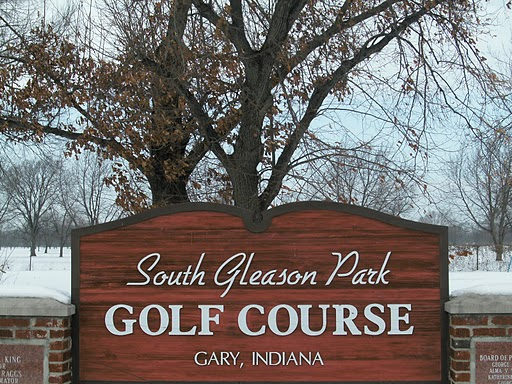
Gleason Park Golf Course

== History ==
Glen Park predates the founding of Gary by two decades. It was platted in 1894 by Chicagoans William Reissig and Charles Williams, near the intersection of the Nickel Plate Railroad and Joliet and Northern Indiana Railroad ("Joliet Cutoff"). A post office was established in 1898. The community was originally named "Kelly," but had come to be called "Glen Park" by 1900.

Historical population
Census	Pop.	Note	%±
1920	2,887		—
1930	15,974		453.3%
1940	17,949		12.4%
1950	21,373		19.1%
1960	27,329		27.9%
1970	32,671		19.5%
1980	32,399		−0.8%
1990	27,705		−14.5%
2000	25,454		−8.1%
2010	18,875		−25.8%
Source: US Census Bureau

After the city of Gary was founded in 1906, the county built a bridge across the Little Calumet to extend Broadway to Glen Park. The portion of Glen Park north of 45th Avenue was annexed shortly thereafter, and the southern part followed in 1926. The first school in Glen Park was built in 1909, and the first church in 1911. Streetcars along Broadway allowed millworkers to commute from Glen Park to the Gary Works at the northern end of Broadway.

The area was strictly segregated until the 1960s, with blacks not allowed to cross the Little Calumet bridge except for work. After Richard Hatcher became Gary's first Black mayor in 1967, a group of Glen Park citizens attempted to disannex from the city. Hatcher characterized the disannexation movement as "white reaction to black ascendency". Glen Park disannexation efforts continued into the early 1970s but were ultimately unsuccessful.

== Glen Park today ==
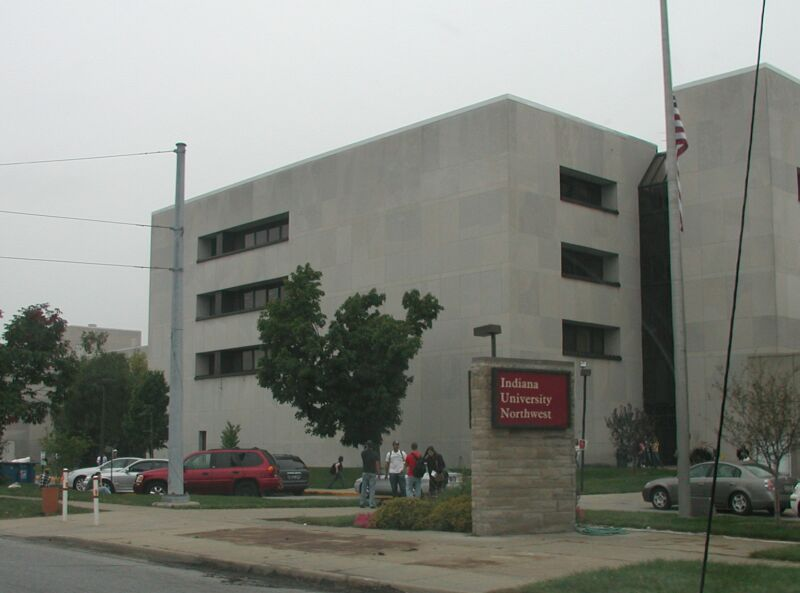
Indiana University Northwest, in Glen Park.

Glen Park is home to Indiana University Northwest and the Gary campus of Ivy Tech Community College. The neighborhood is served by the Borman Expressway directly to its north, which has exits at Broadway and Grant streets, and by Interstate 65 to the east, which has an exit on Ridge Road. Public transportation is provided by the buses of the Gary Public Transportation Corporation, which run along Broadway, Grant and Ridge. Bike trails cross the northern and southern edges of the neighborhood, and there are numerous city parks including the Gleason golf course; the Little Calumet floodplain also provides significant greenspace.

The housing stock is dominated by single-family homes, of which about 50% are owner-occupied. There is little industrial development, and most commercial development is clustered along the Grant and Broadway thoroughfares.
