= East Chicago Transit =

Bus transit network in East Chicago, Indiana

- Headquarters: 5400 Cline Avenue
- Locale: East Chicago, Indiana
- Service area: East Chicago city limits, parts of Griffith and Hammond.
- Service type: bus service, paratransit
- Routes: 3
- Fleet: 7 buses (5 Gillig, 2 Ford)
- Annual ridership: 270,654 (-3.89%)
- Fuel type: Diesel and gas
- Operator: City of East Chicago government
- Chief executive: Francisco Rosado Jr., Director
- Website: East Chicago: Bus Transit

East Chicago Transit (ECT) is the provider of mass transportation in East Chicago, Indiana, an industrial suburb of Chicago, Illinois. Three routes are provided within the municipality's limits. Along with Hammond Transit, the Gary Public Transportation Corporation, and the Valpo V-Line, this agency is managed by its community government but run under the umbrella of the Northwest Indiana Regional Bus Authority. The bus service is partially funded through local casino revenues, and the service is free to all riders.

== Routes ==
- 1 Griffith Plaza
- 2 Crosstown
- 3 West Calumet

== See also ==
- List of bus transit systems in the United States
- South Shore Line
