= Broadway Metro Express =

Bus rapid transit line in Gary, Indiana, US

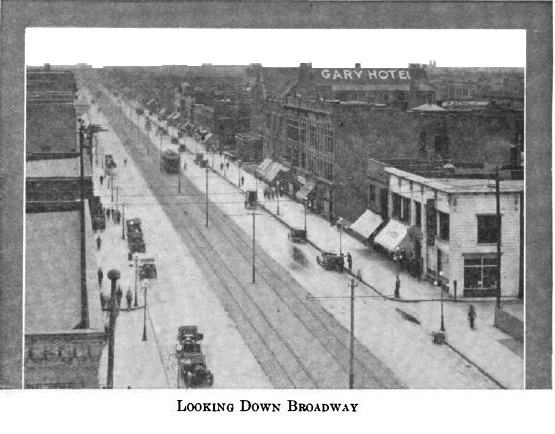
- A view of Broadway in 1915, with former streetcar service

Overview
- Operator: Gary Public Transportation Corporation
- Status: Operational
- Began service: February 19, 2018

Route
- Route type: Bus rapid transit
- Locale: Lake County, Indiana, United States
- Start: Adam Benjamin Jr. Metro Center in Gary
- Via: Broadway
- End: Lake County Government Center in Crown Point
- Stations: 24

Service
- Ridership: 214,455 (2018)

The Broadway Metro Express or BMX operated by Gary Public Transportation Corporation is a bus rapid transit line serving the cities of Gary, Merrillville, and Crown Point in Indiana. The route entered service on February 19, 2018, replacing the previous routes 17 and 18. The Broadway Metro Express connects riders to the South Shore Line, to Downtown Gary and to Ivy Tech Community College of Indiana.

== History ==
BMX service launched on February 19, 2018, through Gary, Merrillville and Crown Point with limited stops, upgraded bus shelters and more frequent service compared to the previous route. This led to it being the first rapid bus service in Indiana. Upon opening, the line ran 11 miles from Gary Metro Center to Methodist Hospitals Southlake Campus in Merrillville, with service every 20 minutes. It included 17 stops, short sections of bus lanes and new connecting feeder lines. South of 53rd Street, traffic signals are equipped with transit signal priority. As of 2022, GPTC was looking to add the feature to the entire corridor. The $9.5 million project was funded by Gary, Merrillville, the Gary Stormwater District, Legacy Foundation and INDOT. At the same time as BMX was launched, GPTC introduced the Token Transit app, to pay fares.

Through the end of the year, BMX carried 214,455 passengers, a 33 percent increase over 2017's ridership on the previous conventional service, and over twice the 16.3 percent anticipated ridership increase. The route is the second busiest line in Northwest Indiana after the South Shore Line, and serves approximately a quarter of all GPTC riders.

On September 8, 2020, three new stops were added, including the Lake County Government Building, the Adam Benjamin Jr. VA Outpatient Clinic, and the Purdue Research Park/Ivy Tech Campus. In Spring 2022, four battery-electric buses joined the GPTC fleet, plying the Broadway Metro Express route. The BMX route was chosen due to it having the highest ridership in the system.

As of June 2023, service runs every 30 minutes, with plans to increase service to every 20 minutes as ridership grows.

== See also ==
- List of bus rapid transit systems in the Americas
