= Calumet Township, Lake County, Indiana =

Calumet Township
- Township
- Seal

- Coordinates: 41°35′07″N 87°21′15″W
- Country: United States
- State: Indiana
- County: Lake
- Organized: 1883

Government
  - Type: Indiana township

Area
  - Total: 68.71 sq mi (178.0 km^{2})
  - Land: 61.38 sq mi (159.0 km^{2})
  - Water: 7.32 sq mi (19.0 km^{2})
- Elevation: 604 ft (184 m)

Population (2020)
  - Total: 91,970
  - Density: 1,698.4/sq mi (655.8/km^{2})
- Time zone: UTC-6 (CST)
  - Summer (DST): UTC-5 (CDT)
- ZIP codes: 46319, 46402-46410
- Area code: 219
- FIPS code: 18-09820
- GNIS feature ID: 453154
- Website: www.calumettwp-in.gov

Calumet Township is one of eleven townships in Lake County, Indiana. As of the 2020 census, its population was 91,970, containing 47,425 housing units, down from 104,258 at 2010.

Historical population
Census	Pop.	Note	%±
1890	944		—
1900	1,408		49.2%
1910	17,982		1,177.1%
1920	55,790		210.3%
1930	103,268		85.1%
1940	119,458		15.7%
1950	150,258		25.8%
1960	210,884		40.3%
1970	215,940		2.4%
1980	176,901		−18.1%
1990	141,875		−19.8%
2000	127,800		−9.9%
2010	104,258		−18.4%
2020	91,970		−11.8%
Source: US Decennial Census

== History ==
The Lake County commissioners established Calumet Township in 1883 from a six-mile-wide strip of North Township. The five-mile-wide strip to the east became part of Hobart Township, and the five-mile-wide strip to the west remained North Township. The commissioners also assigned a row of sections formerly in Ross Township to Calumet Township, including the community of Ross itself.

In 1922, following a protracted dispute over road funding, the county commissioners transferred Miller Beach, which had formerly been in Hobart Township, to Calumet Township. The transfer had originally been sought by the independent Town of Miller in 1914, before the City of Gary had annexed it.

In 2022, following a long legal and political dispute, the passage of a ballot measure in Griffith and the passage of state legislation requiring North Township to accept it, the town of Griffith was transferred out of Calumet Township and into North Township.

== Geography ==
According to the 2010 census, the township has a total area of 68.71 square miles (178.0 km^{2}), of which 61.38 square miles (159.0 km^{2}) (or 89.33%) is land and 7.32 square miles (19.0 km^{2}) (or 10.65%) is water.

=== Cities and towns ===
Calumet Township contains both incorporated and unincorporated areas. The township's sole present-day incorporated community is Gary. A number of former Calumet Township communities have been absorbed into Gary, including the formerly incorporated towns of Aetna, Miller Beach, and Tolleston, and the formerly unincorporated community of Black Oak. The unincorporated community of Ross remains in unincorporated Calumet Township.

Until 2022, a large part of the town of Griffith was in Calumet Township, but all parts of Griffith that had been part of Calumet Township transferred to North Township on January 1, 2022.

=== Cities ===
- Gary (vast majority)
- Lake Station (small portion)

=== Other Communities ===
- Aetna
- Black Oak
- Duneland Village at 41.602535°N 87.272263°W
- Ivanhoe at 41.597813°N 87.424484°W
- Miller Beach
- Pulaski at 41.581203°N 87.302124°W
- Ross at 41.533104°N 87.377464°W
- Tolleston
- Van Loon at 41.568371°N 87.422813°W
- Westside

=== Ghost Town ===
- Indiana City

== Education ==
Calumet Township is served by two public school districts. Most of Incorporated Gary is served by the Gary Community School Corporation. Unincorporated areas of Gary in Calumet Township are served by the Lake Ridge Schools Corporation.
