= Deannexation =

Deannexation, or disannexation, may refer to:

- The reversal of an annexation
- Municipal deannexation in the United States
