= Adam Benjamin =

Adam Benjamin may refer to:

- Adam Benjamin Jr. (1935–1982), American politician
- Adam Benjamin (musician), American jazz keyboardist and composer

== See also ==
- Gary Metro Center, Gary, Indiana
