= Downtown West =

Downtown West can refer to:

- Downtown West, Minneapolis
- Downtown West, St. Louis
- Downtown West End, Calgary
- Downtown West (Gary)
