= Midtown (Gary, Indiana) =

- Neighborhood
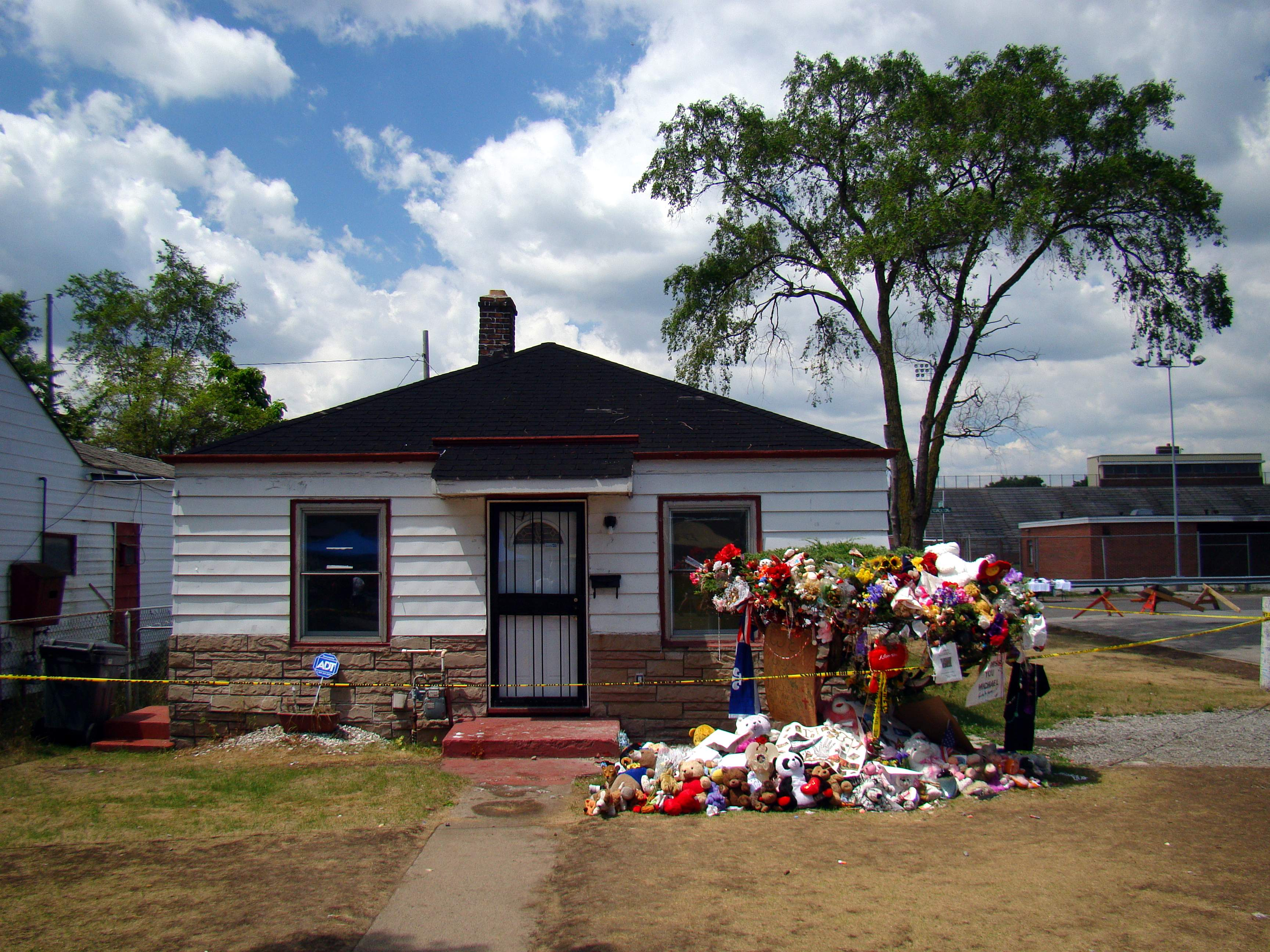
- The Jackson family residence at 2300 Jackson Street in Midtown. This photo was taken in July 2009, showing floral tributes after Michael Jackson's death.

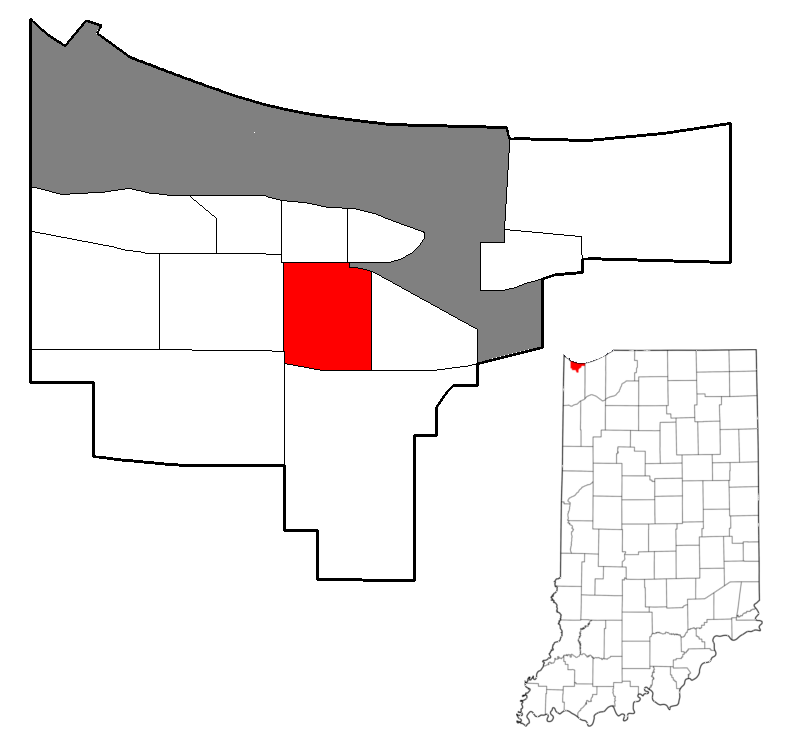
- Location within the city of Gary
- Coordinates: 41.5767°N 87.343813°W
- Country: United States
- State: Indiana
- County: Lake County
- City: Gary

Population (2000)
  - Total: 12,056
- Time zone: UTC-6 (CST)
  - Summer (DST): UTC-5 (CDT)
- ZIP code: 46407
- Area code: 219

Midtown, also called Central, is a neighborhood in central Gary, Indiana. For many decades it was the only African-American neighborhood in the city. It is located south of Downtown West and north of Glen Park along Broadway, Gary's principal thoroughfare. It adjoins the neighborhoods of Tolleston to the west and Pulaski to the east. As of 2000, Midtown had a population of 12,056.

The Midtown neighborhood began as a community of poor white ethnic millworkers, who were excluded from the more upscale neighborhoods close to the Gary Works. Significant African American immigration began after World War I; the neighborhood remained integrated for a time, but gradually the whites moved out as housing became available elsewhere, while the blacks were kept in Midtown by segregationist city ordinances. The neighborhood's white population dropped from 25% in 1940 to 4% in 1950. In the 1950 census, Midtown accounted for 97% of Gary's black population. Prior to desegregation, Midtown was a largely self-contained African-American community: because blacks were largely excluded from Downtown Gary, most retail activity was kept within the neighborhood.

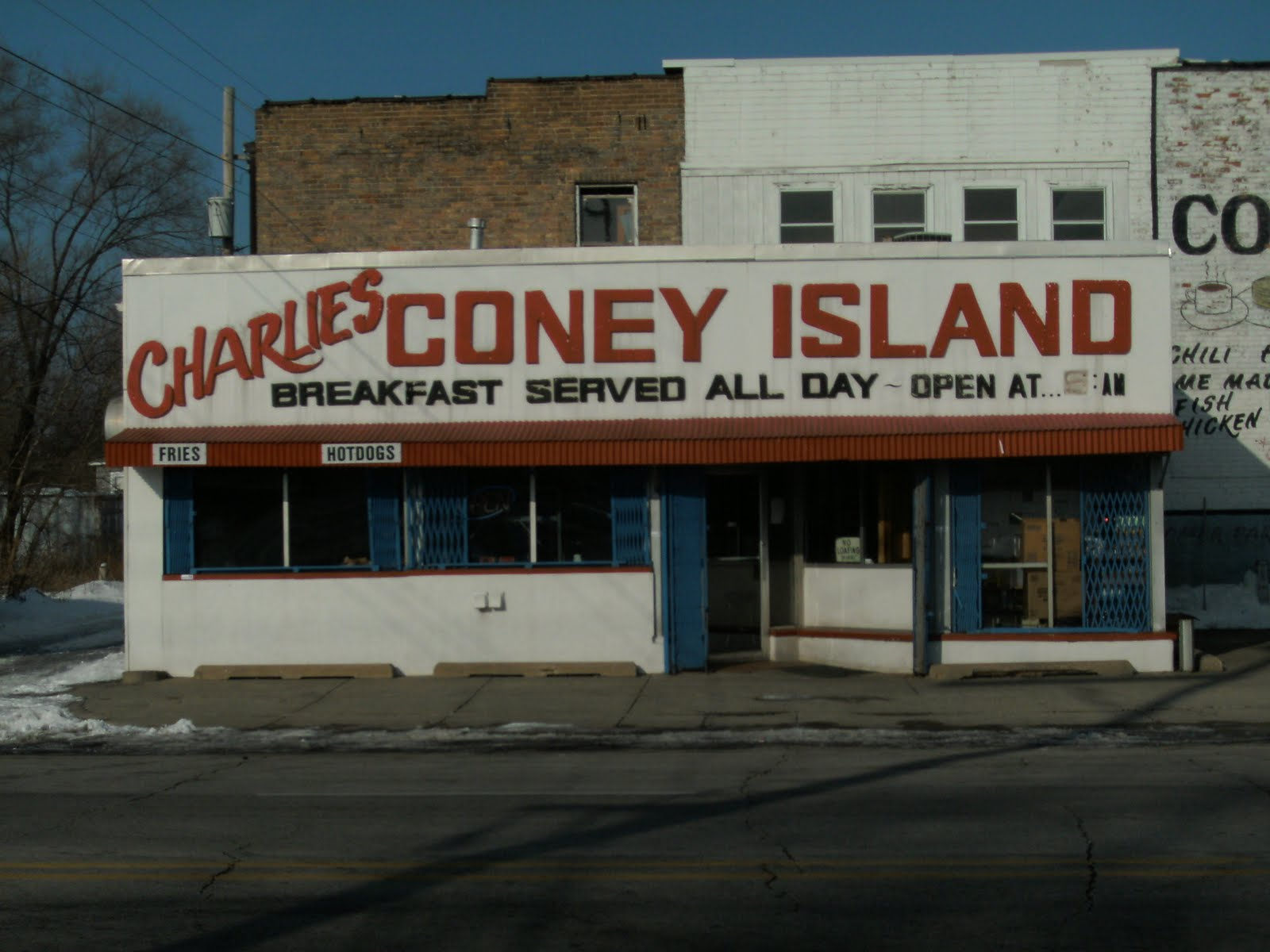
Coney Island on 25th & Broadway

During the Richard Hatcher administration in the 1960s and 1970s, Midtown was targeted for urban renewal, and thousands of substandard homes were demolished. Today Midtown's housing stock is a mixture of single-family and multi-family homes, including a number of affordable housing developments. As of 2000, the owner-occupancy rate was 36.6%. Commercial activity is concentrated along Broadway and Grant streets.

The neighborhood was served by the W.E.B. DuBois branch of the Gary Public Library until it was consolidated with the main branch, and also has its own post office. Public transportation is provided by buses of the Gary Public Transportation Corporation running along Broadway. The neighborhood is the site of Theodore Roosevelt High School.

Famous people from Midtown include the musicians of the Jackson family, such as Michael Jackson and Janet Jackson. Other noted Midtown residents include educator Ida B. King. The neighborhood also hosted many jazz and blues musicians during the segregation period.
