= Downtown West (Gary, Indiana) =

- Neighborhood
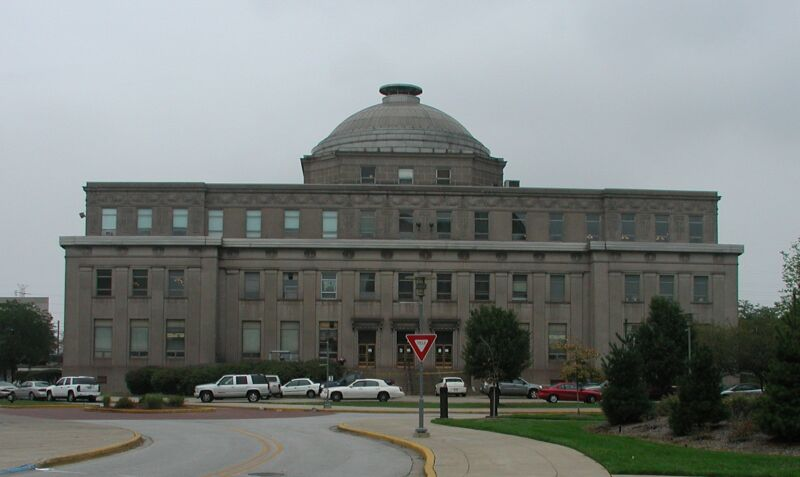
- Lake County Superior Courthouse

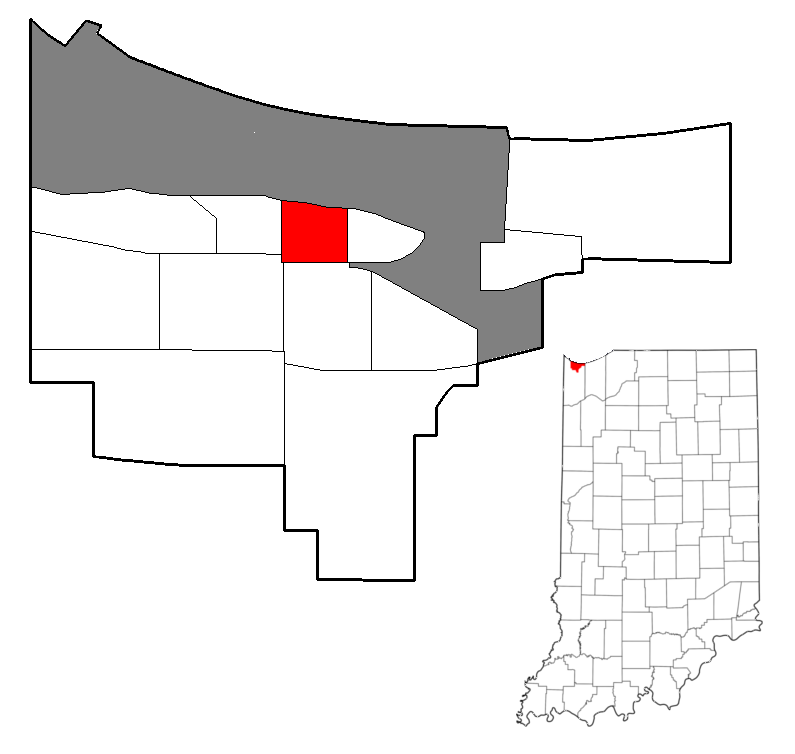
- Location within the city of Gary
- Coordinates: 41.6025°N 87.338611°W
- Country: United States
- State: Indiana
- County: Lake County
- City: Gary
- Founded: 1906

Population (2000)
  - Total: 4,684
- Time zone: UTC-6 (CST)
  - Summer (DST): UTC-5 (CDT)
- ZIP code: 46402
- Area code: 219

Downtown West, is a neighborhood in north-central Gary, Indiana. Emerson and Downtown West combine to form what is known as Downtown Gary. It was part of the original plat built by the United States Steel Corporation. It is located East of Grant Street, south of the Grand Calumet River, north of 9th Avenue and west of Broadway. As of 2000, Downtown West had a population of 4,684. Downtown West borders Emerson to the east, Ambridge Mann to the west, and Midtown to the south.

The Downtown West neighborhood, like Emerson, suffers from extensive vacant lots and abandoned buildings. About 36% of the housing stock are owner-occupied. Gary Metro Center is located just north of 4th Avenue. It is operated by the Gary Public Transportation Corporation and acts as a multimodal hub. Downtown West is served by the Gary Main Post Office and Jefferson Elementary School. The neighborhood has three parks Jackson Park, Borman Square and Rees Park. Pierce Playground, and the smaller portion of Gateway are also located within Downtown West.

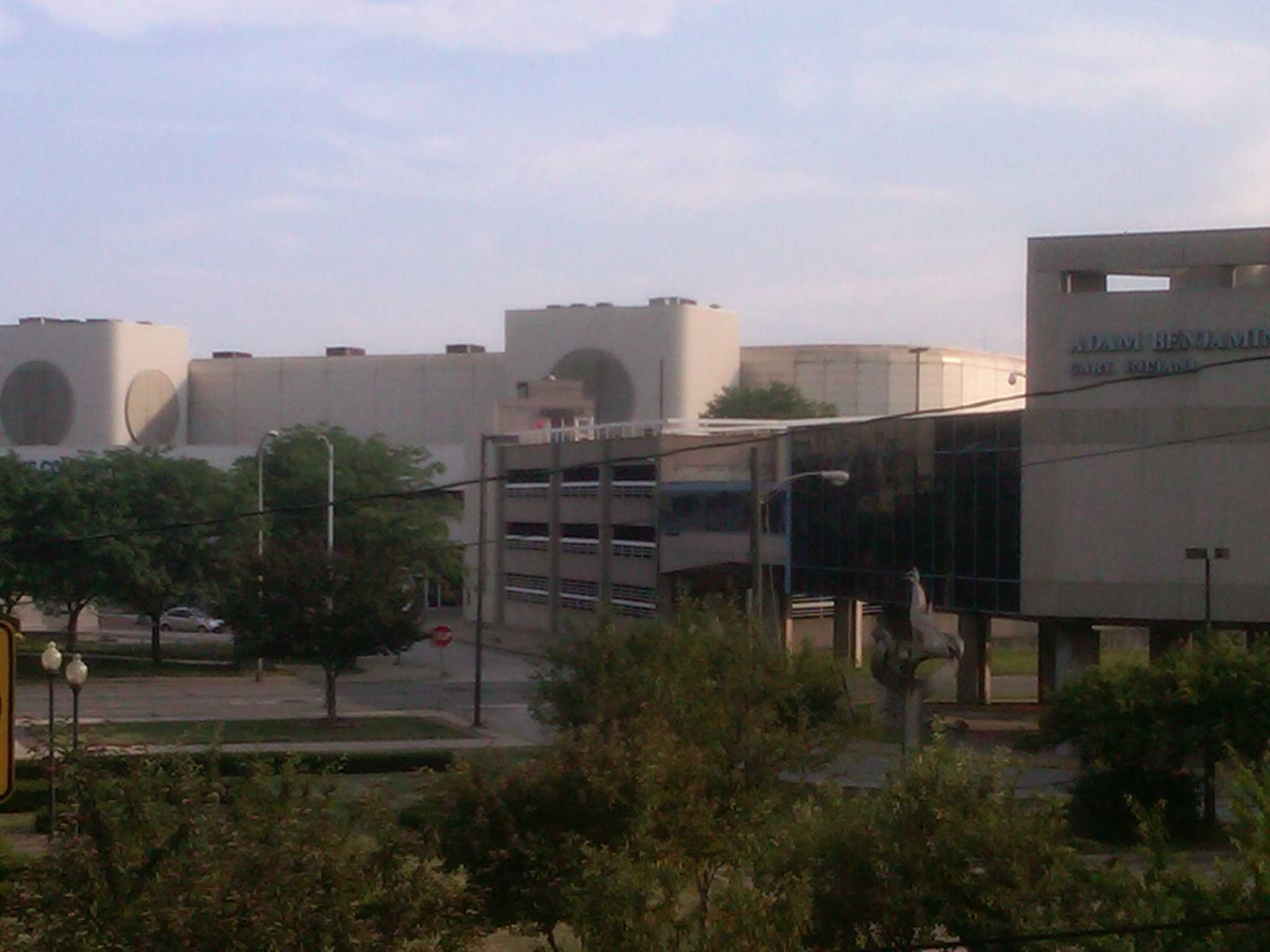
Gary Metro Center and the Genesis Convention Center

The Lake County Superior Courthouse is located in Downtown West along with the Gary Police Department, the Gary Housing Authority offices and the Main Branch of the Gary Public Library. The Genesis Convention Center is located along Broadway and 5th Avenue. It formerly hosted professional basketball. It now host events and concerts. Much of the commercial property along Broadway and Washington Street is now vacant.

The neighborhood is served by the Indiana Toll Road directly to its north, which has exits at Broadway and Grant and by US 12/20 also to the north. Public transportation is provided by the buses of the Gary Public Transportation Corporation, which run along Broadway and 5th Avenue.
