= Miller station =

South Shore Line station in Indiana

Miller
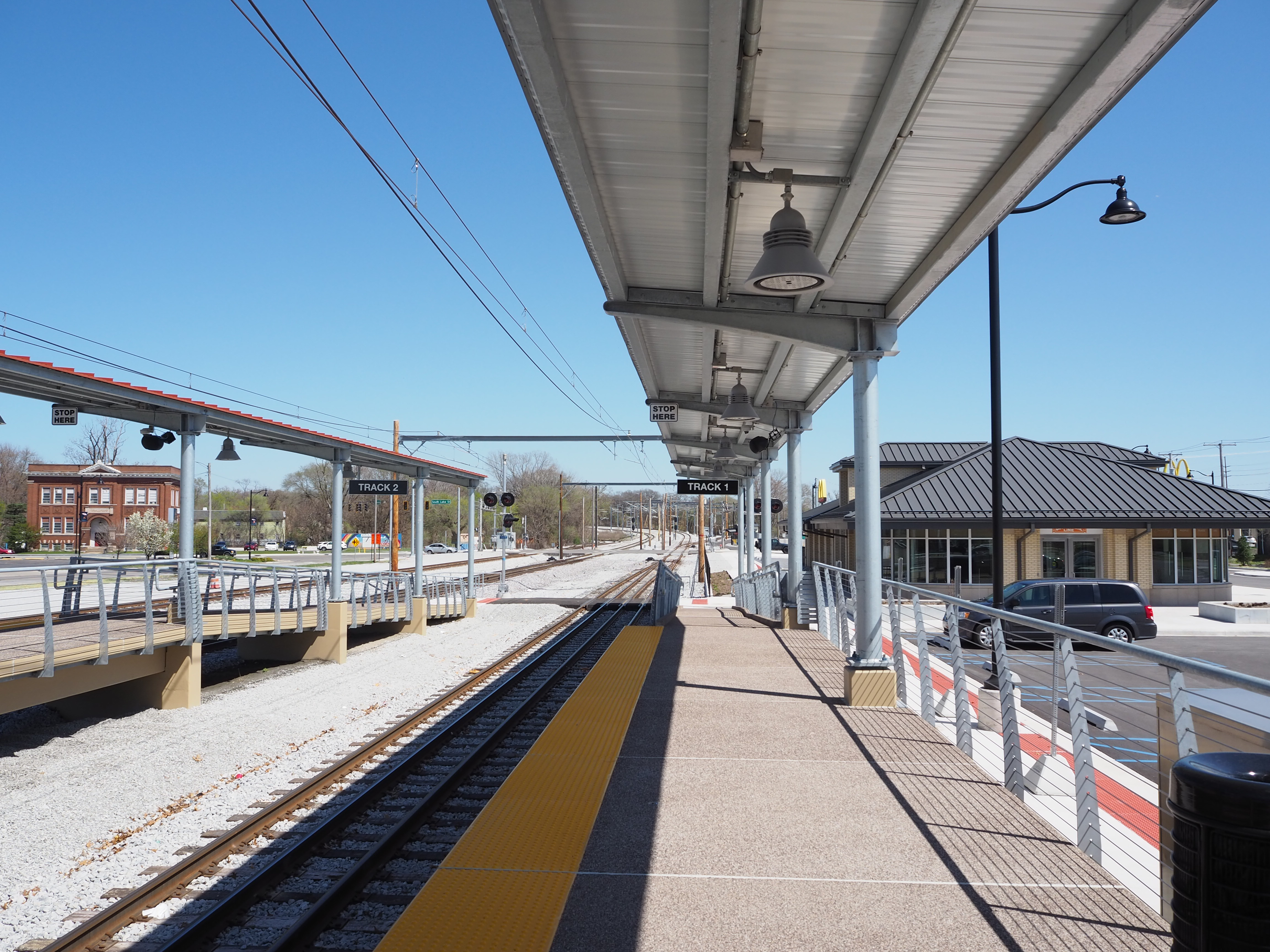
- Outbound platform and the station building

General information
- Location: U.S. Highway 12 and Lake Street; Gary, Indiana
- Coordinates: 41°35′52″N 87°16′6″W
- Owner: NICTD
- Platforms: 2 side platforms
- Tracks: 2 (gauntlet)
- Connections: Gary Public Transportation Corporation

Construction
- Accessible: yes

Other information
- Fare zone: 5

History
- Rebuilt: 1998, 2021–2024

Passengers
- 2019: 339 (average weekday)

Services
Preceding station	NICTD	Following station
Gary Metro Center toward Millennium Station	Lakeshore Corridor	Portage/Ogden Dunes toward South Bend International Airport
Former services
Preceding station	NICTD	Following station
Gary Metro Center toward Randolph Street	South Shore Line	Dune Acres Closed 1994 toward South Bend Airport
Track layout
Location

Miller is a train station in Gary, Indiana, serving the South Shore Line commuter rail system. It serves the community of Miller Beach and is one of three South Shore Line stations within the municipal boundaries of Gary.

The Miller community, now more commonly known as Miller Beach, is physically separated from the city of Gary and from other municipalities in Northwest Indiana by parcels of the Indiana Dunes National Lakeshore. The national park's Douglas Center for Environmental Education and its Miller Woods hiking trails are 0.7 miles (1.1 km) north of the Miller NICTD train station.

== Station Layout ==
The station consists of two tracks, each with one high-level platform located to the south. To the south of the platforms is a parking lot, with a secondary parking lot to the east. Adjacent to the east end of the eastbound (southern) platform is the main station building, containing seating, restrooms, and a space for concessions.

== History ==
The station was served by a local streetcar line, the Gary and Miller Railway, until the 1930s. A new station shelter was constructed in 1998.

=== Renovation ===
On October 30, 2007, the executive director of the Northwestern Indiana Regional Planning Commission announced that the current plan calls for the Miller station to be closed at an undisclosed date. This plan was met with fierce opposition from Miller residents as well as commuters from other neighboring communities who use the station. Miller station commuters objected to being forced to use the new Gary central station. On August 12, 2008, Gateway Partners, the developers behind the new project, announced their intention to revamp their proposal in response to controversy.

From 2021 to 2024, the station was substantially renovated as part of a larger project to double track the South Shore Line between Gary and Michigan City. The renovation added an additional track to the station and replaced the low-level platform with two high-level platforms (one to the south of each track), making the station accessible to passengers with disabilities. The renovation also added a new station building with seating, restrooms, and a space for retail, improved the existing parking lot, and added a new parking lot to the west of the station. The renovation also added a stub track to the east of the station, allowing short-turn trains between Chicago and Miller. This renovation is projected to be completed in mid-2024.

== Bus connections ==
GPTC

- Route L2: Oak and County Line
