= Municipal deannexation in the United States =

Deannexation is the removal of an area from the boundaries of a municipality. It is the reverse of annexation, but is not limited to formerly annexed territory: even portions of a municipality's original territory may be deannexed. Deannexation may also apply to other local government entities, such as school districts.

Other terms for deannexation include disannexation, secession, detachment, disconnection, severance and exclusion. Deannexation for the purpose of creating a new municipality is sometimes called division.

The procedures and requirements for deannexation vary greatly among the states. Most states provide for some sort of deannexation procedure, and a majority of those states also allow residents to petition for deannexation. Many states specifically require some sort of judicial or administrative agency review of deannexation petitions.

Deannexations are much less common than annexations. When they occur, they are typically small-scale and involve individual properties; deannexations of entire neighborhoods are unusual.

== Purposes ==
Deannexation may result in the formation of a new municipal corporation, ceding the affected land to another municipality, or returning it to its unincorporated condition. Land is often deannexed in order to switch it from one municipality to another, or in order to form a new municipality on it. For example, cities sometimes deannex land in order to rationalize strange borders created by past annexation wars. In contrast, large-scale deannexations in which the deannexed land becomes unincorporated are extremely rare.

Portions of cities may attempt to deannex from a city due to political disagreements with city leadership, as with 1990s deannexation campaigns in Staten Island and the San Fernando Valley. A great deal of deannexation research has focused specifically on the San Fernando Valley dispute.

Majority-white cities have sometimes attempted to deannex regions with large minority populations in order to preserve white voters' power. Some grassroots deannexation campaigns have likewise been initiated by majority-white areas, motivated by what Richard G. Hatcher described as "white reaction to black ascendency". African American communities impacted by a racially motivated annexation may seek relief through deannexation, as occurred when the Brandy Creek neighborhood of Weldon, North Carolina was annexed into Roanoke Rapids for an economic development project.

Only one deannexation has ever been struck down on constitutional grounds: the Alabama legislature's deannexation of majority-Black areas from Tuskegee in 1957 in order to preserve white supremacy in the city government, which the Supreme Court invalidated in Gomillion v. Lightfoot.

== Procedures ==
Deannexations typically involve consultations between the property owners in the area to be deannexed and the municipality. Deannexation also often involves local legislation passed by the state legislature.

From the standpoint of separation of powers, deannexation is a legislative function because it relates to municipal boundaries, which are traditionally reserved to the legislature. However, a few cases have held that courts have a equitable power to deannex land to which no municipal services are provided.

Legislatures often delegate their powers by involving courts in the process, either by providing for deannexation petitions to be brought before a court or by providing for judicial review of deannexation rulings by a municipality. Judicial discretion is, however, typically quite limited. Legislatures may also sometimes delegate the review of deannexation petitions to an administrative agency. They may also delegate the power of deannexation to municipalities directly. In all of these cases, the power to deannex must be exercised in the exact manner prescribed by the legislature or the deannexation is null and void. As of 2017, 36 states provided for some sort of delegated deannexation procedure.

The procedure for such a deannexation most typically involves four steps: first, a request is made for deannexation, either by the city legislature or signed by a required percentage of property owners or residents in the affected area; second, the request is presented to a designated authority, such as a court; third, the authority reviews the request to see if it meets statutory requirements; fourth, the authority grants the requested deannexation unless the request is improper.

Laws governing resident-initiated deannexation are diverse. A 2016 study of 28 states that provide for resident-initiated deannexation found that the required level of support was variously determined by percentages of landowners, voters, or a combination of the two, and ranged from 100% of affected landowners in many states to 5% of all landowners citywide in West Virginia, while in Missouri a petition can be filed by any resident of the affected area. Eleven of the 28 states allowed petitions only when the deannexation would not create a "donut hole" inside an existing municipality. Seven allowed petitions only when the affected area had not received any public improvements, while some additional states allowed petitions only if the affected area had not received public services, or had received inadequate services. Some states limit the right to petition to areas that have not been platted, or that are used for only agricultural purposes. Petitions may be addressed to a court, to the affected municipality itself, or to the people through a referendum. In most cases the referendum is citywide. Ohio uniquely provides for a referendum in which only those qualified voters who live in the affected area may vote; this is limited to proposed deannexations of areas of 1500 acres or greater.

== Frequency and effects ==
Deannexations are uncommon. Large-scale deannexations are even less common, as most deannexations involve only one or a few properties. Census data through 1980 indicated that the average size of a deannexation was 285 acres.

Compared to annexation, the impact of deannexation on municipal boundaries is quite small. A study covering 1950 to 1976 found that deannexations accounted for 1.4% of boundary changes. A study of Texas municipal boundary changes from 2000 to 2010 found that deannexation accounted for only 2.6% of the overall changes in municipal area during the study period.

In general, when land is deannexed from a local government, the debts of the local government do not stay with the land, unless a statute provides otherwise. Bondholders are assumed to have constructive notice that local boundaries can change.

Deannexation can bring both costs and benefits to the deannexed area. For example, for homeowners otherwise inclined to leave a city, deannexation provides the benefits of avoiding the expense of relocation and increased commuting times. For this reason, white residents of school districts with increasing African American enrollment sometimes pursue deannexation from the school district as an alternative to white flight.

== By state ==
- In Alaska, a deannexation petition must be presented to the Department of Commerce, Community and Economic Development, which reviews the petition and presents its findings to the Local Boundary Commission (LBC). If the LBC approves the petition, the question of deannexation may be either placed before the state legislature, which can veto it within 10 days, or put before the voters of the affected area by referendum. Deannexation petitions may be brought by residents or municipalities, or by the LCB itself.
- In California, deannexation from both cities and counties is allowed on resident initiative, but requires majority approval of the affected area and the city or county as a whole. A city council veto over deannexations, introduced in 1977, was abolished in 1997. The San Fernando Valley, the scene of deannexation efforts since the 1920s, lost a vote to separate from Los Angeles in 2002. The deannexation vote won a bare majority of 50.7% in the Valley, but failed by a wide margin in the city as a whole. Similar outcomes of a majority approval in the area seeking deannexation and majority disapproval in the county as a whole doomed seven different county deannexation campaigns in the 1970s.
- In Georgia, deannexation requires either local legislation passed by the Georgia General Assembly or consent by 100% of property owners, and by the city and county governments. In 2018, the General Assembly passed local legislation that allowed voters in a wealthy enclave of Stockbridge, Georgia to decide if they wanted to secede. The referendum failed.
- In Indiana, the Indiana Code allows disannexation petitions signed by the owners of 51% of the affected properties to be brought before a municipality's board of works. The board's decision can then be appealed and tried de novo before a trial court. The 51% threshold was introduced in the 1960s at the instance of Gary mayor Richard Hatcher during a battle over the deannexation of Glen Park; the threshold had previously been 10%. More recently the communities of Black Oak in the 1980s and Miller Beach in 2007 have unsuccessfully campaigned to deannex from the city.
- In New York, deannexation from a village is governed by N.Y. Village Law § 18-1804, which requires consent by the village government and by the voters in a special election. Deannexations must be notified to the New York Secretary of State. New York has no general deannexation law for cities. Staten Island attempted to deannex from New York City in a 1993 referendum, in which 65% of State Island voters voted to secede. A bill to implement the deannexation was introduced in the State Assembly, but was blocked on the grounds that under the state's constitution, the legislature could not act on such a bill unless it was requested by New York City itself.
- In North Carolina, only the state legislature can deannex land from cities. In 1998, a portion of the town of Calabash, North Carolina, voted to deannex after the legislature allowed a referendum on the issue. The area subsequently incorporated as the town of Carolina Shores. In 2011, the legislature deannexed the neighborhood of Brandy Creek from Roanoke Rapids, having annexed the neighborhood by legislation six years earlier. In June 2024, the legislature deannexed close to 1000 acres owned by developer David Couch from Summerfield after the town denied his planned development. Nearly a year later, nearby Greensboro voted to annex a portion of this land. House Bill 801 in 2025 would require the review and possible suspension or revocation of "paper towns", defined as "a town which exists in fact but do not provide adequate services".
- In Wyoming, deannexation can be initiated by a resident but is at the discretion of the municipality. The county in which the deannexed property is located must be given 60 days to study the effects of a proposed disannexation, and "donut hole" deannexations are prohibited.

== See also ==
- Urban secession, in which a city becomes independent of its surrounding political entity.
- City secession, in which a new municipality is formed.
