= Emerson (Gary, Indiana) =

- Neighborhood
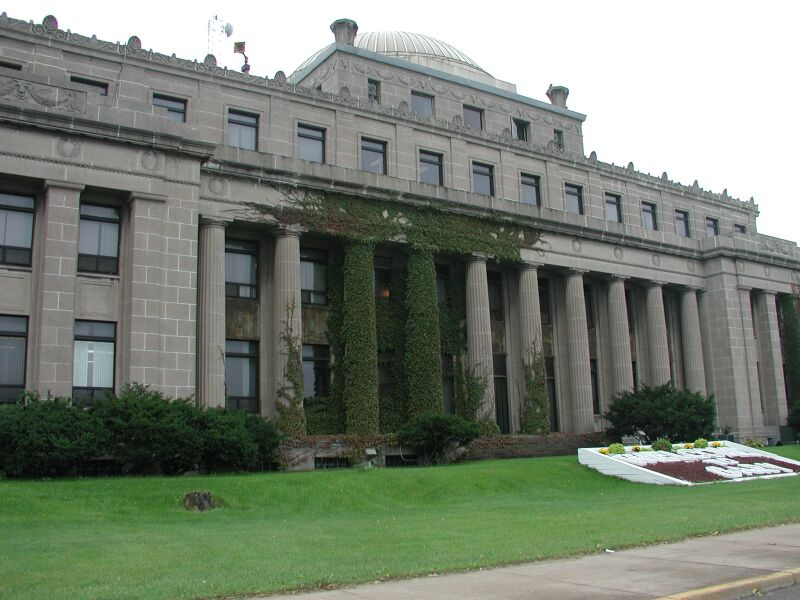
- City Hall

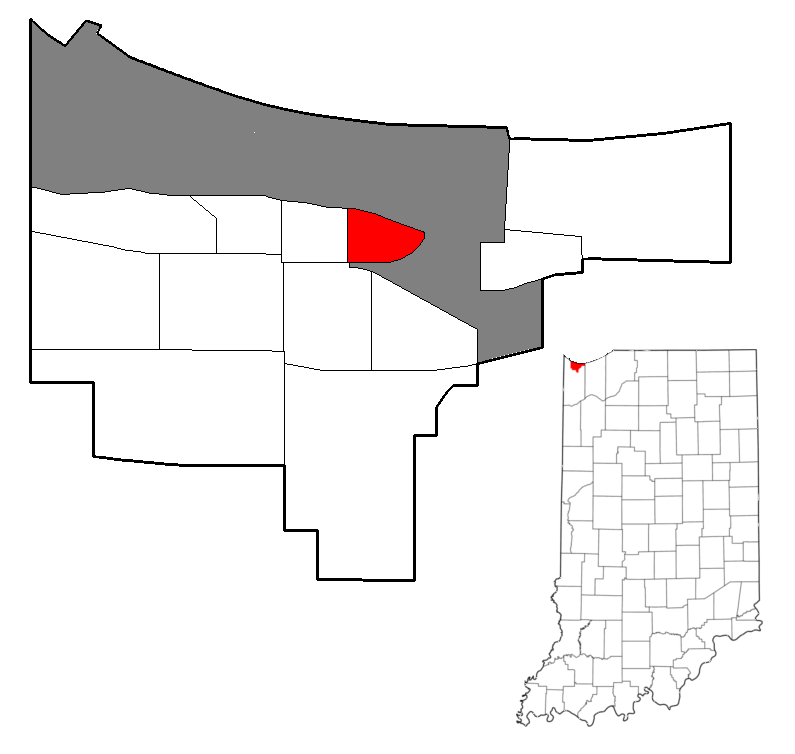
- Location within the city of Gary
- Coordinates: 41.602869°N 87.332217°W
- Country: United States
- State: Indiana
- County: Lake County
- City: Gary
- Founded: 1906

Population (2000)
  - Total: 3,358
- Time zone: UTC-6 (CST)
  - Summer (DST): UTC-5 (CDT)
- ZIP code: 46402
- Area code: 219

Emerson, also called Downtown East, is a neighborhood in north-central Gary, Indiana. Emerson and Downtown West combine to form what is known as Downtown Gary. It was part of the original plat built by the United States Steel Corporation. Emerson is located east of Broadway, south of the Grand Calumet River, north of Ninth Avenue and west of Interstate 65. As of 2000, it had a population of 3,358. Emerson borders directly on Downtown West to the west but is separated from the Aetna and Pulaski neighborhoods to the east and south by an industrial corridor.

Emerson has a large number of vacant lots and abandoned buildings and the lowest number of housing units in the city. About 40% of the houses are owner-occupied. There are 44 new housing units between Fifth and Sixth Avenues. Emerson is served by the Gary Main Post Office. In the past it was served by the now decaying E.A. Spaulding Elementary School and Emerson School for Visual and Performing Arts; both schools now stand vacant. Emerson has two city parks, Buffington Park, Idle Hour Park, and the larger portion of Gateway Park.

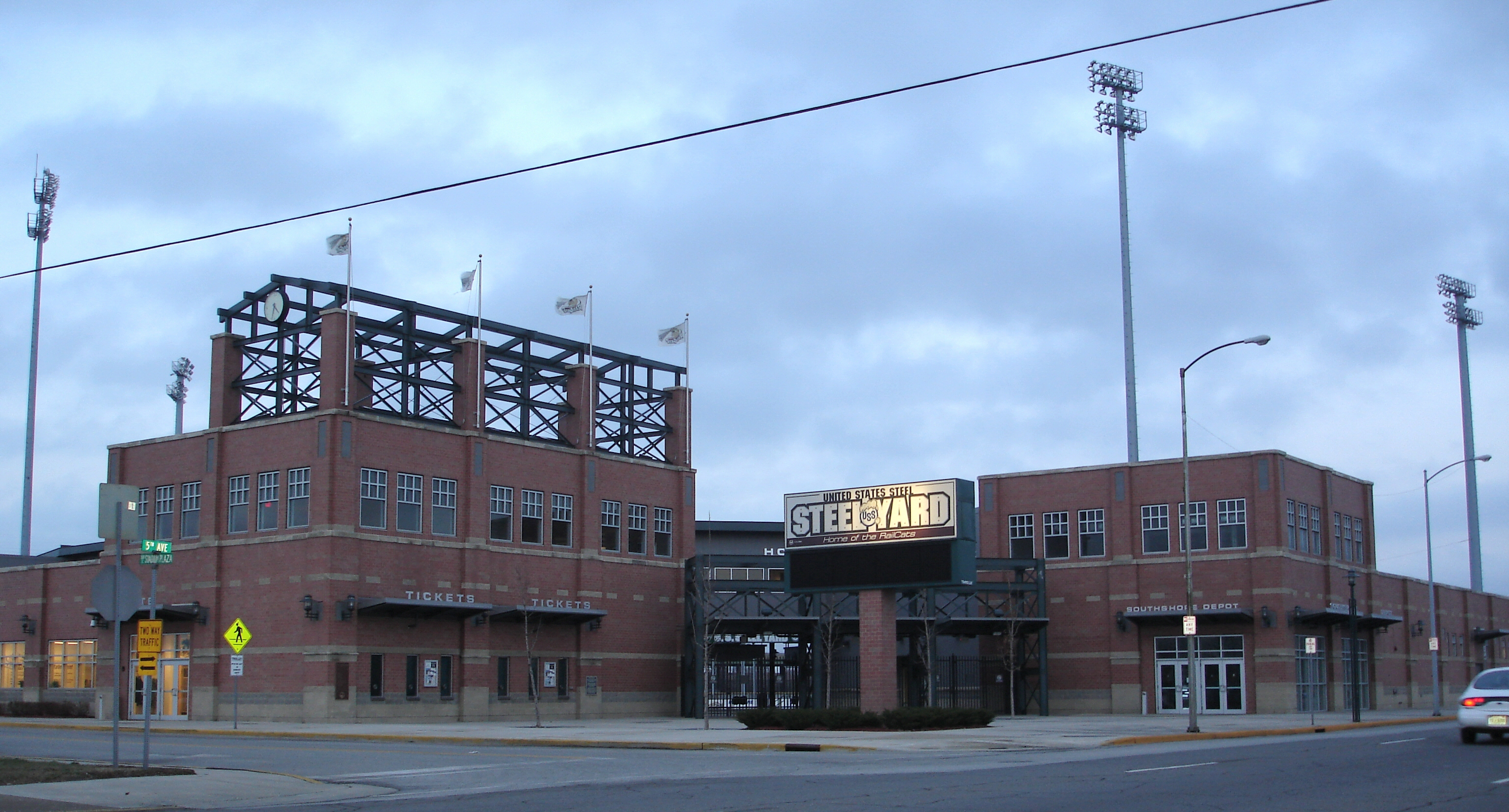
U.S. Steel Yard

Gary City Hall is located in Emerson along with the Indiana Department of Social Services building and the Calumet Township Trustee's office. In 2001 the U.S. Steel Yard baseball stadium was built in an effort to stimulate a rebirth of the downtown. It was built on what was once a blighted section of housing. Its construction was highly controversial. However, it has proven somewhat successful, drawing fans from surrounding communities. In September 2009, the one millionth fan walked into the U.S. Steel Yard. Much of the commercial property along Broadway is now vacant. But there are some newer properties along Fifth Avenue.

The neighborhood is served by the Indiana Toll Road directly to its north, which has exits at Broadway and Fifth Avenue; by Interstate 65 to the east, which has an exit on Fifth Avenue; and by US 12/20, also to the north. Public transportation is provided by Gary Public Transportation Corporation, with buses running along Broadway and Fifth Avenue.
