= Ross, Indiana =

- Unincorporated community and Census-designated place
- Location within Indiana Location within the United States
- Coordinates: 41°31′34″N 87°22′26″W
- Country: United States
- State: Indiana
- County: Lake
- Township: Calumet
- Elevation: 643 ft (196 m)
- ZIP Code: 46408 (Gary)
- Area code: 219
- FIPS code: 18-66085
- GNIS feature ID: 2830892

Ross is an unincorporated community in Calumet Township, Lake County, Indiana.

== History ==
Ross was named for William Ross, a pioneer settler. A post office was established at Ross in 1857, and remained in operation until it was discontinued in 1914.

== Demographics ==
Historical population
Census	Pop.	Note	%±
2023 (est.)	6,740

The United States Census Bureau defined Ross as a census designated place in the 2023 American Community Survey.
