= Downtown Gary =

- Neighborhood
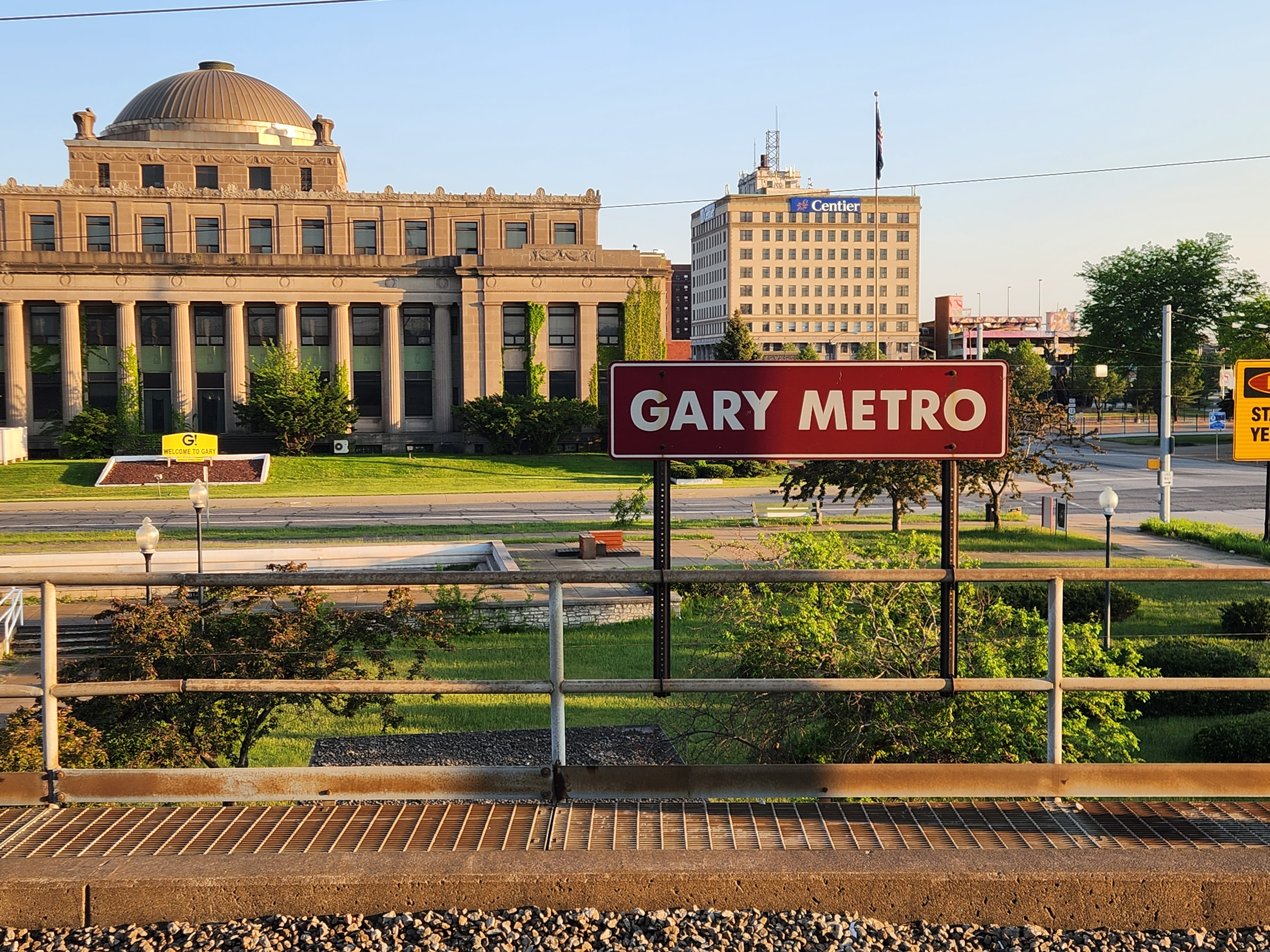
- View of Downtown Gary via NICTD South Shore Line Gary Metro Station

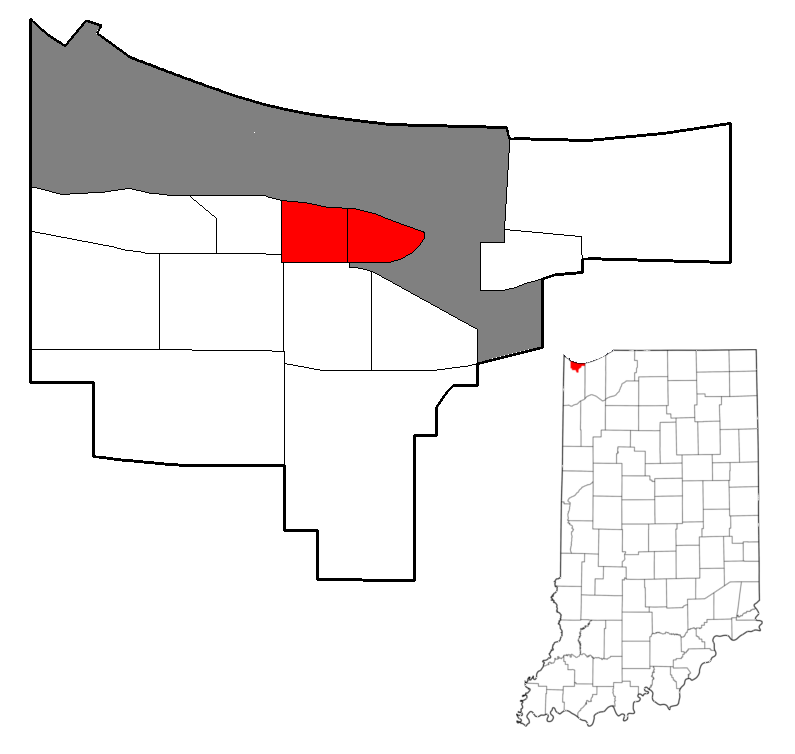
- Location within the city of Gary
- Coordinates: 41.6039°N 87.33717°W
- Country: United States
- State: Indiana
- County: Lake County
- City: Gary
- Founded: 1906

Population (2000)
  - Total: 8,042
- Time zone: UTC-6 (CST)
  - Summer (DST): UTC-5 (CDT)
- ZIP code: 46402
- Area code: 219

Downtown Gary is split by Broadway into two separate neighborhoods in north-central Gary, Indiana, United States. Emerson and Downtown West combine to form what is known as Downtown Gary. It was part of the original plat built by the United States Steel Corporation. It is located east of Grant Street, south of the Grand Calumet River, north of 9th Avenue, and west of Interstate 65. Downtown West borders Ambridge Mann to the west and Midtown to the south, but it is separated from the Aetna and Pulaski neighborhoods to the east and south by an industrial corridor.

== Governmental ==
Gary City Hall and Lake County Superior Courthouse are located at the north end of Downtown Gary. The two domed structures stand across Broadway from each other along 4th Avenue. Further south along Broadway are the Indiana Department of Social Services building and the Gary Housing Authority offices. Along 5th Avenue are the Calumet Township Trustee's office, the Gary Police Department, and the main branch of the Gary Public Library.

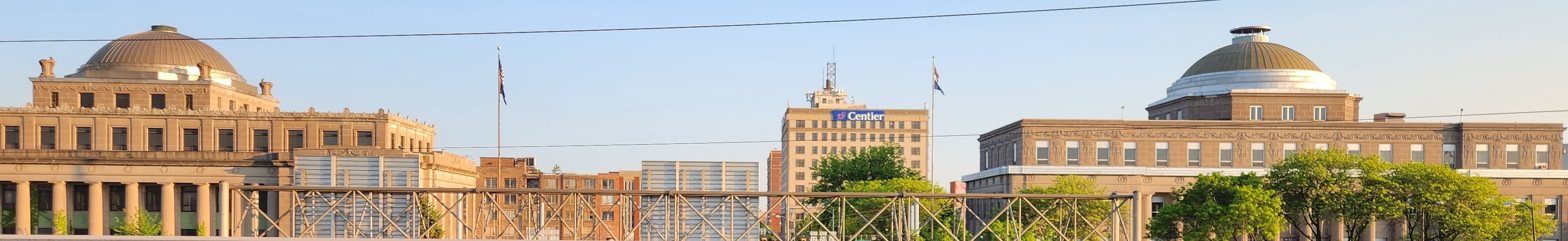
Gary City Hall (Left) Gary State Bank (Center) Lake County Superior Court House (Right)

== Commercial ==
Much of the commercial property along Broadway and Washington Street is now vacant. There is some new development along 5th Avenue. A large area of the downtown neighborhood (including City Methodist) was devastated by fire on October 12, 1997. The Genesis Convention Center, on Broadway and 5th Avenue, was built in 1981 in a failed effort to stimulate a rebirth of the downtown. It formerly hosted professional basketball, but now hosts only events and concerts. In 2001 the U.S. Steel Yard baseball stadium was built in another effort to stimulate development. Built on what was once a fairly blighted section of housing, its construction was highly controversial. However, it has proven somewhat successful drawing fans from surrounding communities. In September 2009, the one-millionth fan walked into the U.S. Steel Yard.

== Residential ==
The Downtown neighborhood suffers from extensive vacant lots and abandoned buildings. As of 2000, Downtown Gary had a population of 8,042. About 38% of the housing stock is owner-occupied. However, there were 44 new housing units built between 5th and 6th Avenue east of Broadway.

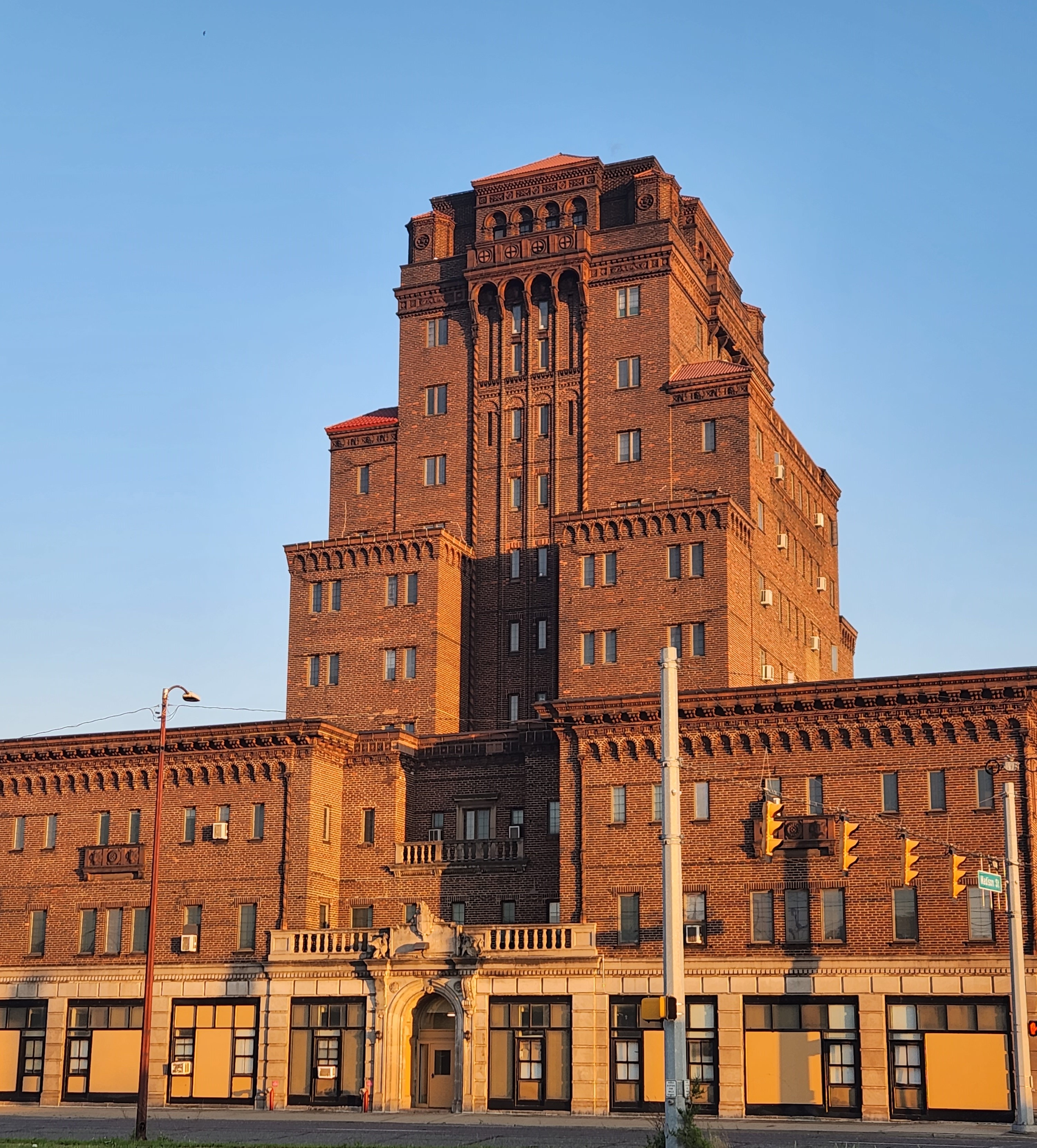
Gary Knights of Columbus Building

== Transportation ==
The neighborhood is served by the Indiana Toll Road directly to its north, which has exits at Broadway, Grant Street, and 5th Avenue, by Interstate 65 to the east, which has an exit on 5th Avenue, and by US 12/20 also to the north. Gary Metro Center is located just north of 4th Avenue. It is operated by the Gary Public Transportation Corporation and acts as a multimodal hub. Public transportation is provided by the buses of the Gary Public Transportation Corporation, which run along Broadway and 5th Avenue.
