= Steel Yard (baseball stadium) =

Baseball stadium in Gary, Indiana, US

Coordinates: 41°36′10.33″N 87°19′55.98″W

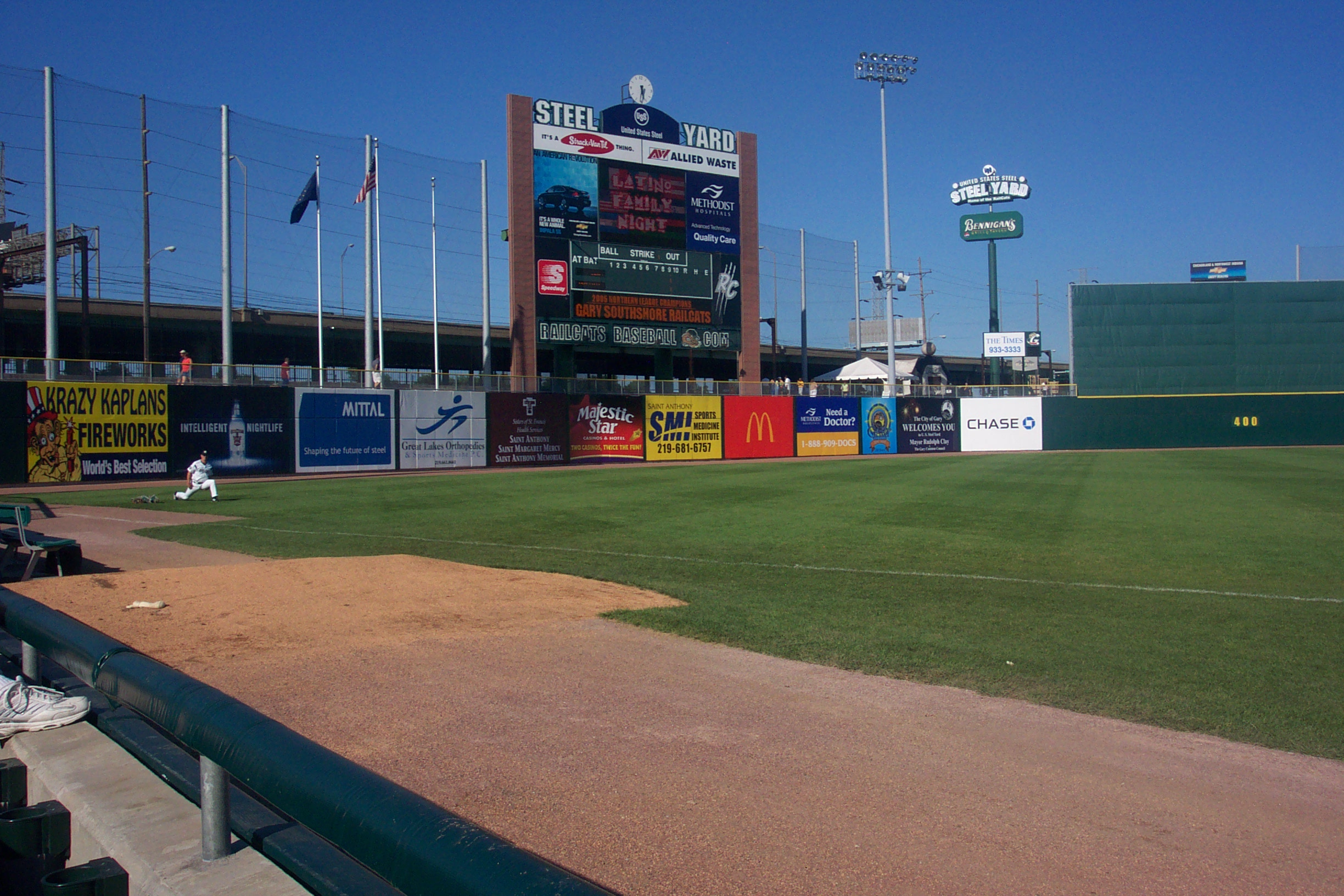
- U.S. Steel Yard with I-90 in the background
- Interactive map of Steel Yard
- Former names: RailCats Stadium (2001–2002)
- Location: One Stadium Plaza; Gary, Indiana 46402
- Owner: Gary, Indiana
- Operator: Gary SouthShore RailCats
- Capacity: Baseball: 6,139
- Field size: Left - 320'; Left-center - 380'; Center - 400'; Right-center - 390'; Right - 335'

Construction
- Groundbreaking: June 22, 2001
- Opened: August 9, 2002
- Cost: $45 million
- Architect: HNTB

Tenant
- Gary SouthShore RailCats (NL/AA) 2002–present

Steel Yard is an open-air baseball stadium in Gary, Indiana, located next to Interstate 90 in the city's Emerson neighborhood. It is the home ballpark of the Gary SouthShore RailCats, a professional baseball team in the American Association of Professional Baseball, an official Major League Baseball Partner League. The stadium has a seating capacity of 6,139.

The ballpark has also hosted amateur baseball and other community events. On July 10, 2009, more than 6,000 people attended a memorial celebration for pop musician and Gary native Michael Jackson at the stadium. The event included musical and dance performances, appearances by members of Jackson's family and remarks by the Rev. Jesse Jackson.

By 2023, more than two million fans had attended RailCats games at U.S. Steel Yard.

== History ==
In February 2001, the Northern League's Board of Directors approved a request by Northwest Sports Ventures, LLC to start an expansion baseball team in Gary, Indiana. The team was scheduled to start play in the 2002 Northern League season. Later that year, a limited liability company named Victory Sports Group took the task to build a ballpark in downtown Gary. In July 2001, the City of Gary and Victory agreed on a 15-year lease that would facilitate the building of a state-of-the-art ballpark with construction scheduled to be completed in May 2002; the groundbreaking ceremony was held at this time. In September 2001, the ownership named this baseball team the Gary SouthShore RailCats, with their stadium to be called RailCats Stadium.

In October 2001, the City of Gary and the construction and architectural companies involved in the building of the new ballpark announced that it would not be completed in time for the 2002 Northern League season. As a result, all the RailCats' games in their inaugural 2002 season were played on the road. During the 2002 season, the RailCats traveled more than 12,000 miles (19,000 km) and spent more than 800 hours on the road in buses. RailCats Stadium was completed in August 2002, with a dedication ceremony and open house held on August 8. The first baseball games played in this stadium were part of a Little League Baseball tournament held the following week. The stadium also hosted various Gospel and Blues events throughout the next few months.

In May 2003, the RailCats' ownership and U.S. Steel sign a 10-year naming rights agreement, effectively renaming the ballpark U.S. Steel Yard. On May 26, 2003, the RailCats played their inaugural home opener in the new ballpark before a sellout crowd of 7,089; the first pitch was thrown at 3:28 pm Eastern Standard Time. The RailCats lost to the visiting Schaumburg Flyers 8–4 in 11 innings. The next day, on May 27, the first home run was hit in U.S. Steel Yard by outfielder Billy Brown; the RailCats recorded their first win in the new ballpark, defeating the Flyers 5–4. After drawing 26,648 fans in August 2003, the RailCats would compile a 2003 regular season attendance of 140,310 over 44 home games – an average of 3,189 fans per game.

In the 2004 Northern League season, the RailCats brought in a regular season attendance of 147,801 over 46 home games with an average of 3,213 fans per game. On 12 separate occasions attendance was over 4,000 fans, which included two sellout crowds. The RailCats finished the 2004 season with a record of 31–65. In the 2005 Northern League season, U.S. Steel Yard hosted the league's annual all-star game on July 19, which U.S. Steel sponsored. The Northern League's North Division defeated the South Division 5–1 in front of a crowd of 6,825 – the second-largest attendance in U.S. Steel Yard's history. The 2005 season also saw the RailCats' first playoff berth; they eventually lost in the Northern League Championship Series to the Fargo-Moorhead RedHawks.

In the 2009 Northern League baseball season, the RailCats drew 185,747 fans to U.S. Steel Yard – an increase of 6,748 fans from the 2008 Northern League baseball season. In September 2009, the one millionth fan walked into the U.S. Steel Yard.

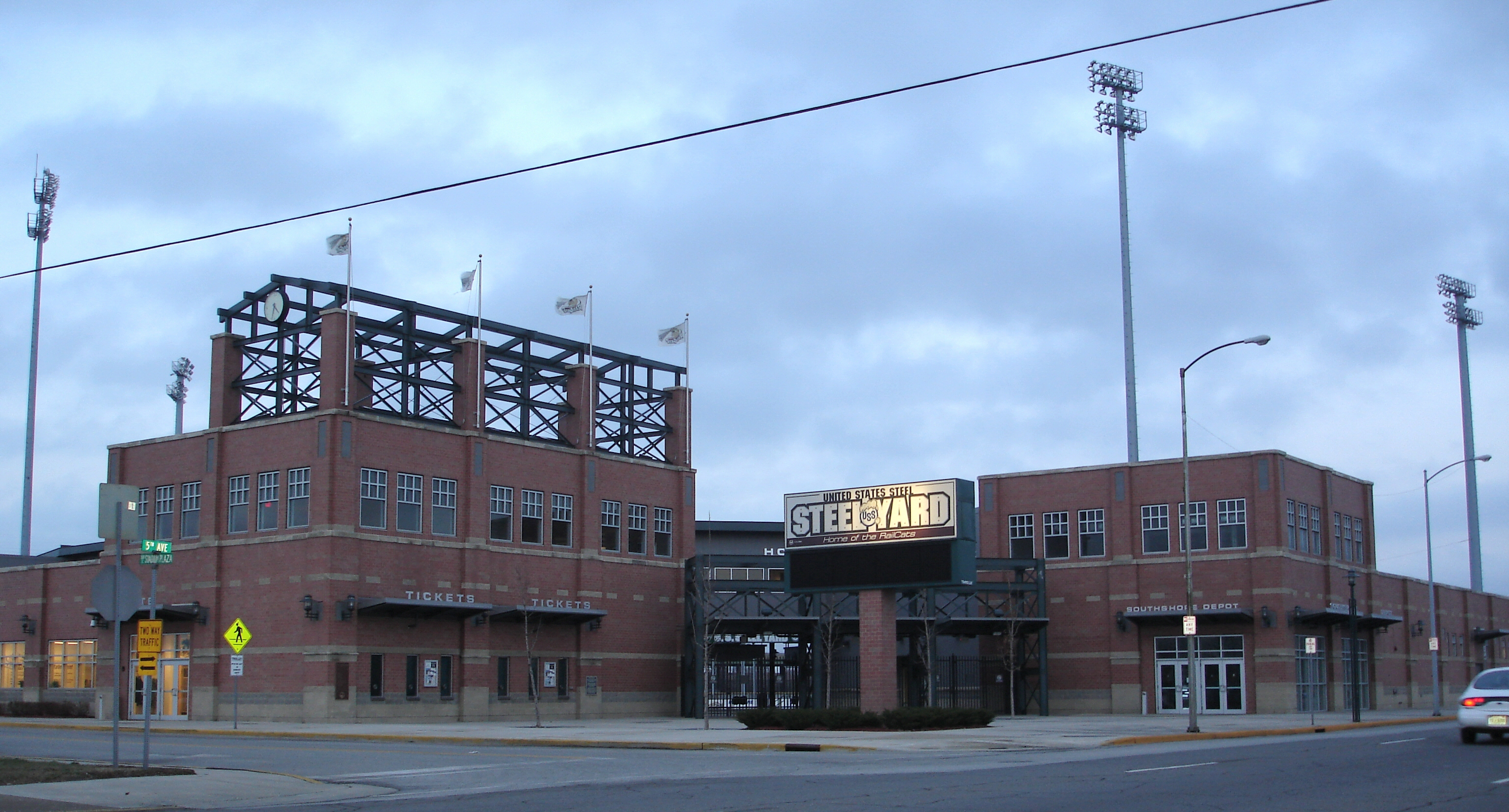

=== Michael Jackson's memorial service ===
On July 10, 2009, a memorial service was held at U.S. Steel Yard for deceased pop musician and Gary native Michael Jackson. Over 6,000 fans attended the service, which also served as a musical tribute to the pop star, as local musicians played a few of Jackson's songs. At the service, Gary mayor Rudy Clay unveiled a 7-foot-4-inch (2.24 m) granite plaque of Jackson. Originally, Clay talked to the Jackson family about having Michael's body on display in Gary for the service, saying that the service would be "fit for the prince of peace and a memorial that's fit for Gary, Indiana's favorite son, the greatest entertainer that ever lived". This was discussed as part of a plan to have Jackson buried in Gary. About 20 of Jackson's cousins attended the service, along with Michael's father Joe Jackson – who showed up two hours into the service – and Rev. Jesse Jackson.

=== 2012 NCAA Division I baseball tournament Regional ===
The Purdue Boilermakers chose U.S. Steel Yard to host their regional bracket of the 2012 NCAA Division I baseball tournament. Besides Purdue, the Kentucky Wildcats, the Kent State Golden Flashes and the Valparaiso Crusaders played in the Gary Regional on June 1–4, 2012, with Kent State winning to advance to the Eugene Super Regional.

Events and tenants
Preceded by Silver Cross Field	Host of the NoL All-Star Game; U.S. Steel Yard; 2005	Succeeded by CommunityAmerica Ballpark
