= Pulaski (Gary, Indiana) =

- Neighborhood
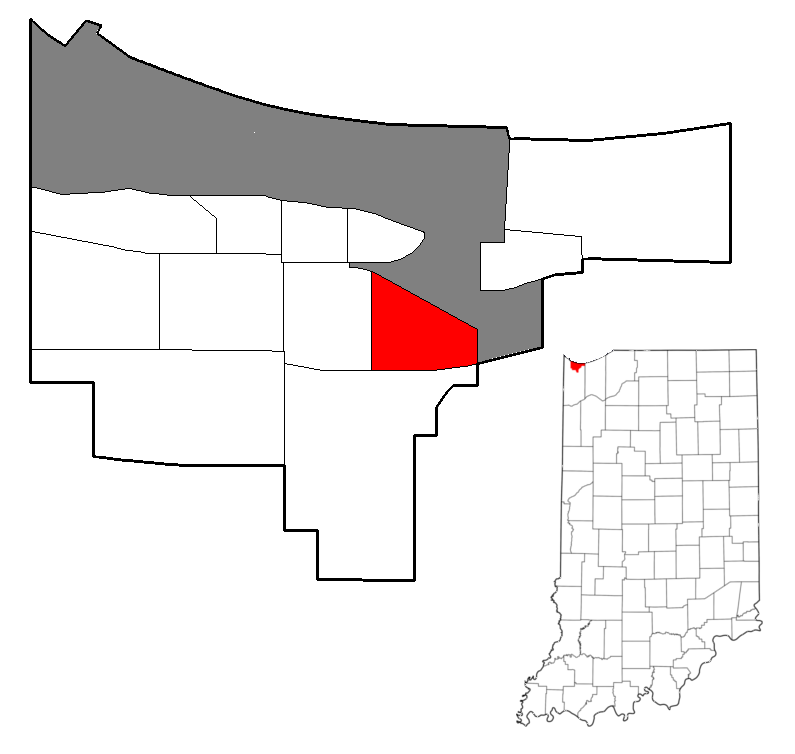
- Location within the city of Gary
- Coordinates: 41.588089°N 87.3171051°W
- Country: United States
- State: Indiana
- County: Lake County
- City: Gary

Population (2000)
  - Total: 6,777
- Time zone: UTC-6 (CST)
  - Summer (DST): UTC-5 (CDT)
- ZIP code: 46407
- Area code: 219

Pulaski is a neighborhood in eastern Gary, Indiana. It is roughly triangular in shape, bounded on the south by the Borman Expressway, on the west by Maryland Street, and on the northeast by the Norfolk Southern railway. It is separated by an industrial corridor from Aetna to its east and Emerson to its north; it directly adjoins the neighborhoods of Midtown and Glen Park. As of 2000, Pulaski's population was 6,777, which was 96.7% African-American, 1.4% white, and 1.3% of Hispanic ethnicity.

Pulaski was originally settled by white ethnic millworkers from the 1920s to 1950s. It was one of the first neighborhoods in Gary to be integrated, as upwardly-mobile African-American families moved in from neighboring Midtown in the 1950s. In 1970, the neighborhood's population was 11,825, nearly double what it is today.

The neighborhood was the site of Gary's first experiment with urban renewal, beginning in 1963. This experiment caused considerable damage to the community.

There is little retail in the neighborhood, apart from a small cluster of shops at 21st and Virginia. The housing stock consists primarily of single-family homes, although there are also several apartment complexes. Pulaski's housing stock has a 96% occupancy rate and a 40% owner-occupancy rate. The neighborhood includes a large subdivision called Marshalltown. There are three elementary schools and a middle school.

The neighborhood includes a portion of the Little Calumet River floodplain in its southeastern corner, where there is significant open space. There are also several small community parks. As with many Gary neighborhoods, illegal dumping is a serious problem in disused areas.
