= Aetna (Gary, Indiana) =

- Neighborhood
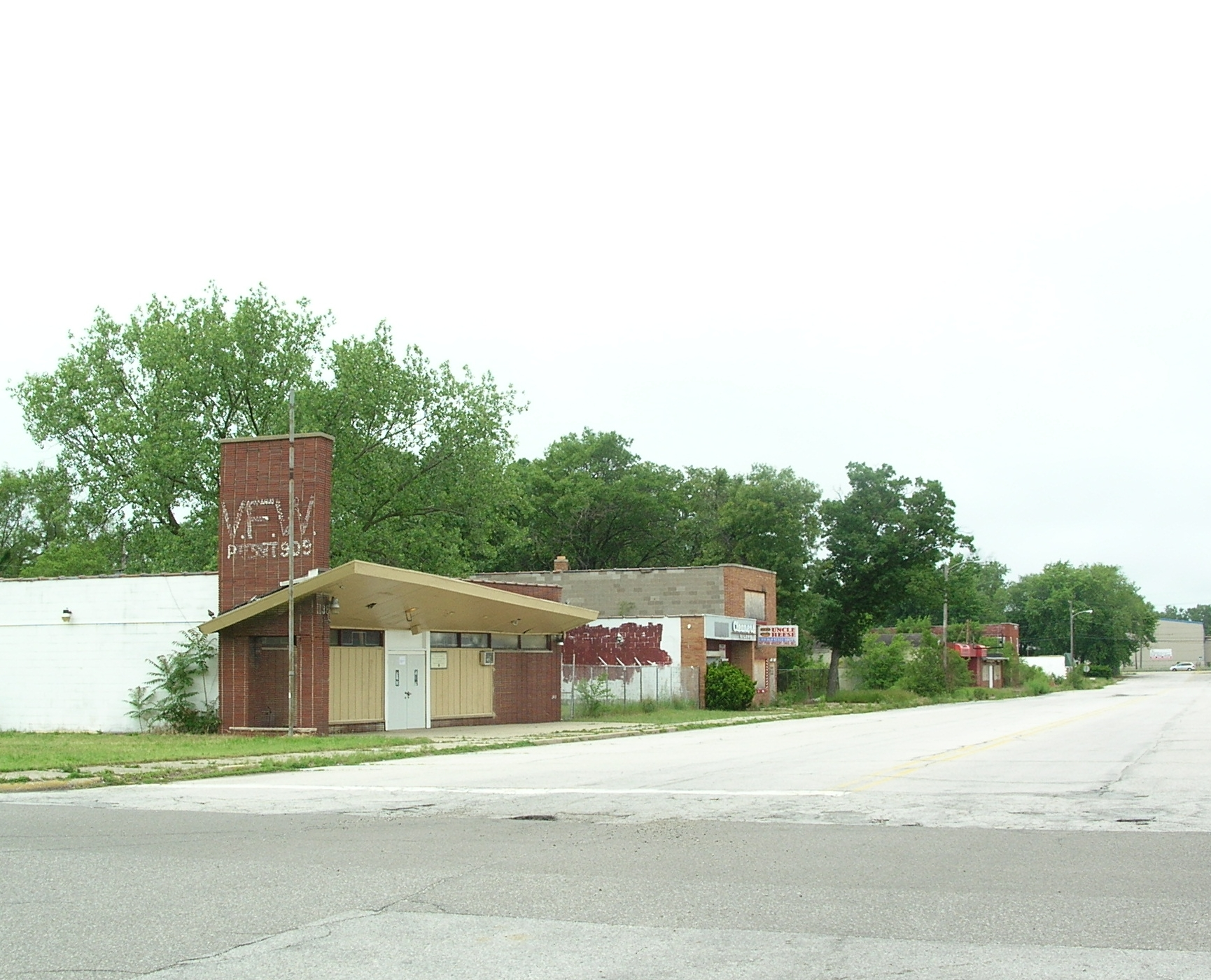
- The former downtown area of Aetna

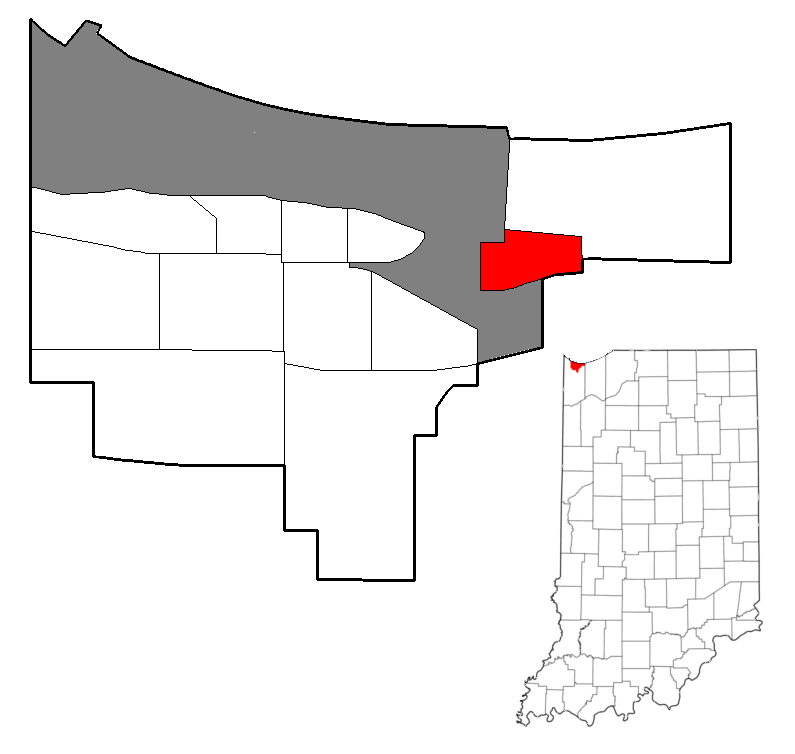
- Location within the city of Gary
- Coordinates: 41.590893°N 87.289149°W
- Country: United States
- State: Indiana
- County: Lake County
- City: Gary
- First settled: 1881
- Incorporated: 1907
- Annexed by Gary: 1928

Population (2000)
  - Total: 4,942
- Time zone: UTC-6 (CST)
  - Summer (DST): UTC-5 (CDT)
- ZIP code: 46403
- Area code: 219

Aetna is a neighborhood in northeastern Gary, Indiana, south of Miller Beach and east of Interstate 65. As of 2000, the neighborhood had a population of 4,942, which was 83% black and 11% white.

Aetna borders directly on Miller Beach to the northeast, but is separated from the Emerson and Pulaski neighborhoods to the west by the industrial corridor along Interstate 65, and from the town of Lake Station to the south and east by the floodplain of the Little Calumet River. Aetna is divided from the Miller Beach neighborhood by Route 20 with Aetna being the area of Gary East of I65 but south of U.S. 20.

Aetna's housing stock is dominated by small single-family homes, with 89% occupancy and 66% owner-occupancy as of 2000. Aetna's housing prices are significantly below the city average. This contrasts to homes in neighboring Miller Beach, which are among the city's most expensive.

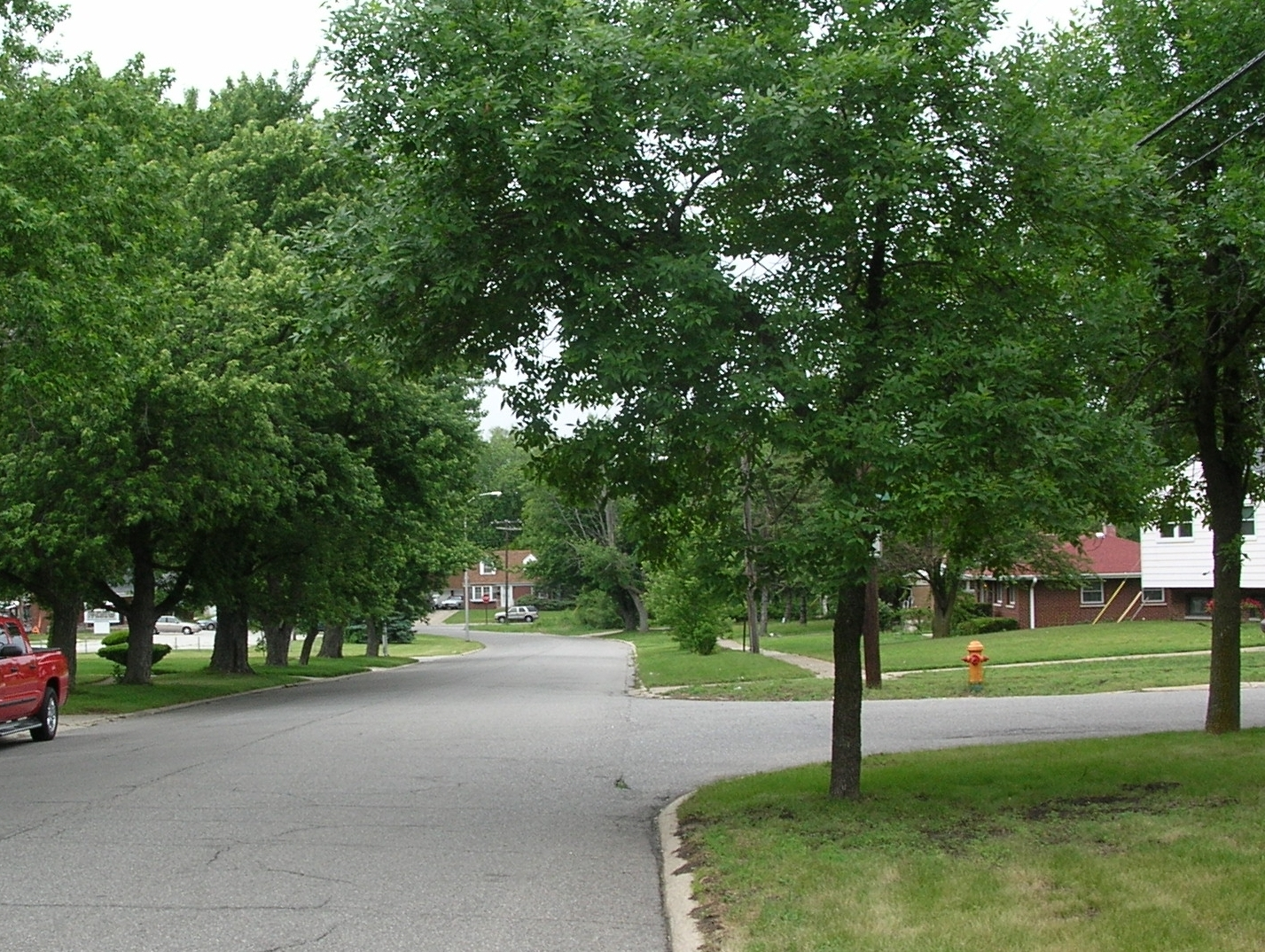
A typical residential street in Aetna

Aetna shares with Miller Beach the U.S. 20 retail corridor, one of the major retail areas in Gary. It is home to a 3.5-acre city park, Aetna Park. Aetna is also near the much larger recreational areas of Miller Beach, such as Marquette Park and the Indiana Dunes National Lakeshore. It is served by a single bus route of the Gary Public Transportation Corporation; the same route also serves Miller Beach.

Aetna was founded in 1881 as a company town for the Aetna Powder Company, a munitions manufacturer. The location was chosen in part for its remoteness, in rolling dune and swale country nearly a mile from the small town of Miller. The factory employed about 500 workers, most of whom lived in Aetna although some commuted from nearby towns. Originally the munitions had to be carted to the train station in Miller for shipment, but the arrival of the Wabash Railroad in 1895 gave Aetna its own train station. The plant suffered from frequent violent explosions, often fatal; a 1912 explosion caused six deaths, and another in 1914 broke windows as far away as downtown Gary. During World War I, the factory employed 1200 people. However, it closed after the war, and Aetna's population shrank to fewer than 100.

Aetna was incorporated as a town in 1907. It was annexed by Gary in proceedings lasting from 1924 to 1928.

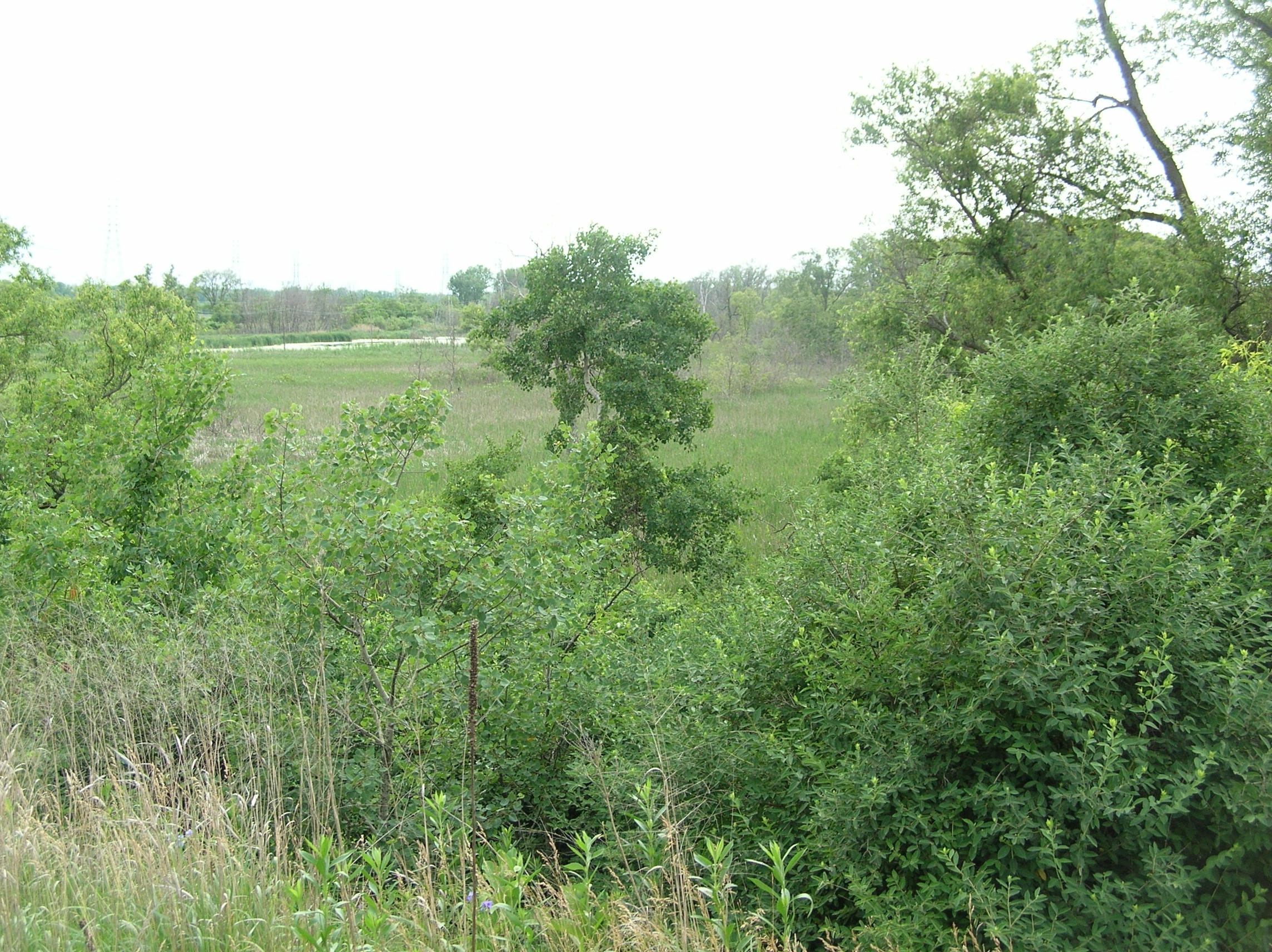
Aetna's southeastern corner consists of undeveloped wetlands.
