= Hammond Transit =

Transit system in Hammond, Indiana, U.S.

Hammond Transit System
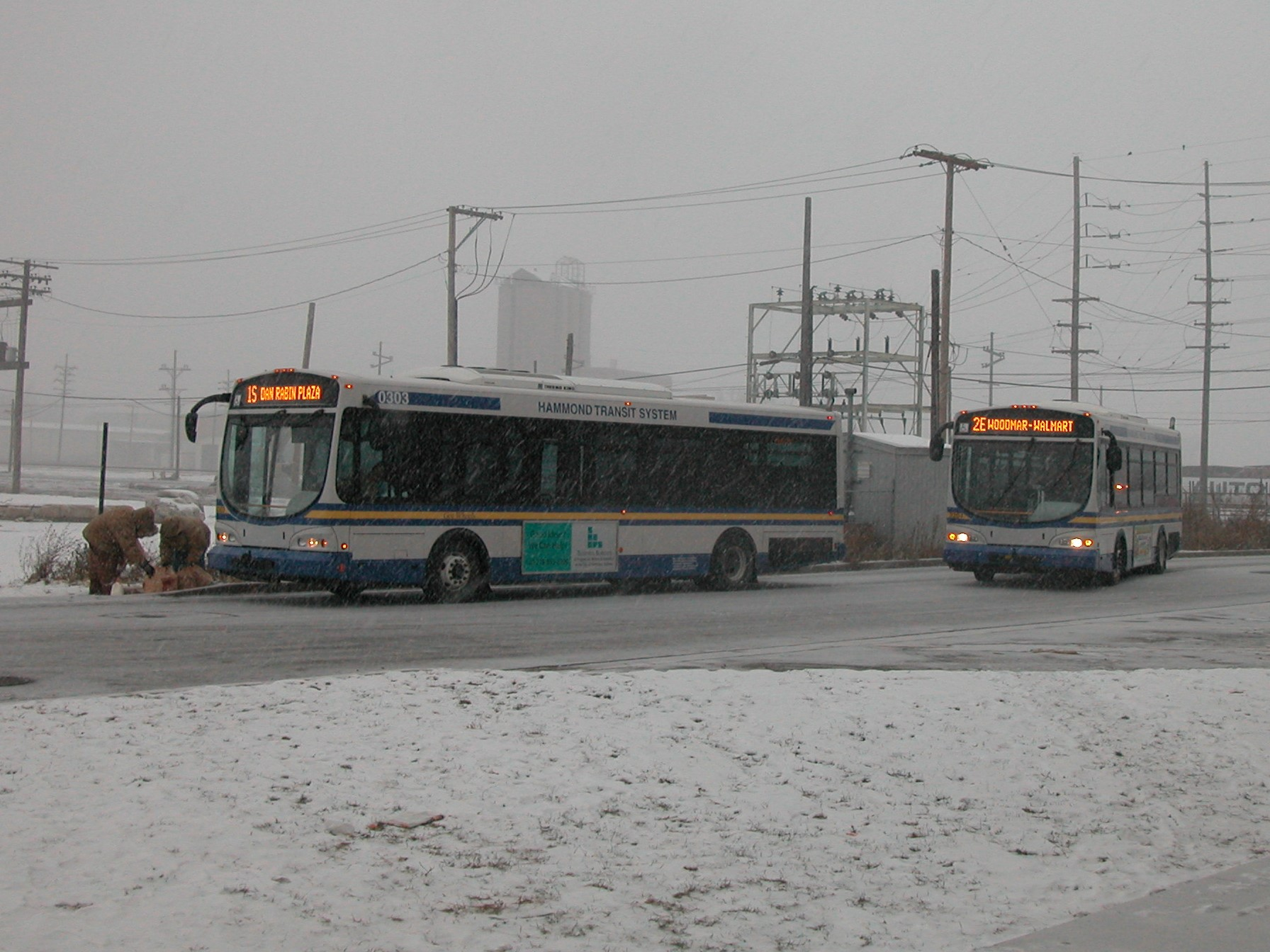
- Headquarters: 425 Sibley Avenue
- Locale: Hammond, Indiana
- Service type: Fixed Route, demand-response
- Routes: 5 (all routes discontinued as of June 30, 2012)
- Fleet: 10 vehicles
- Annual ridership: 290,536 (-27.95%)
- Fuel type: diesel
- Operator: Northwest Indiana Regional Bus Authority (as of January 1, 2010)
- Chief executive: Keith E. Matosovsky, Director
- Website: Official Site

Hammond Transit System was the provider of bus service in the Chicago suburb of Hammond, Indiana. It featured four local intra-city routes and one route that provides access to neighboring Whiting and Chicago's East Side neighborhood. The system was established in 1976 as replacement for the discontinued bus service provided by Chicago & Calumet District Transit Co. The service was a division of the Hammond city government. As of January 1, 2010, the system is operated by the Northwest Indiana Regional Bus Authority. Hammond Transit Center acts as a transit hub, linking together all system routes, as well as Pace suburban bus system, East Chicago Transit and Gary Public Transportation Corporation bus routes.

The Hammond Transit System and the EasyGo bus system discontinued all service as of June 30, 2012.

== History ==
=== Hammond Transit System and Merger Negotiations ===
In January 2009, Hammond officials announced that the Hammond Transit System would be shut down on July 1, 2009, due to the lack of funds. In February, Thomas McDermott Jr, mayor of Hammond decided to postpone the shutdown until the end of the year in hopes that a funding solution will materialize. In effort to save money, the Saturday service was eliminated and the service frequency on all routes was decreased to one bus per hour (in some routes, 75 minutes).

In August 2009, the city of Hammond and Northwest Indiana's Regional Bus Authority met to discuss the system's future. They eventually came up with an agreement. Under its provisions, RBA assumed control of Hammond Transit System on January 1, 2010. The city of Hammond pledged to provide a portion of the funding for the next two years. The rest is paid by RBA, a grant from Northwest Indiana Regional Development Authority as well as a variety of state and federal funds.

=== RBA Assumes Control ===
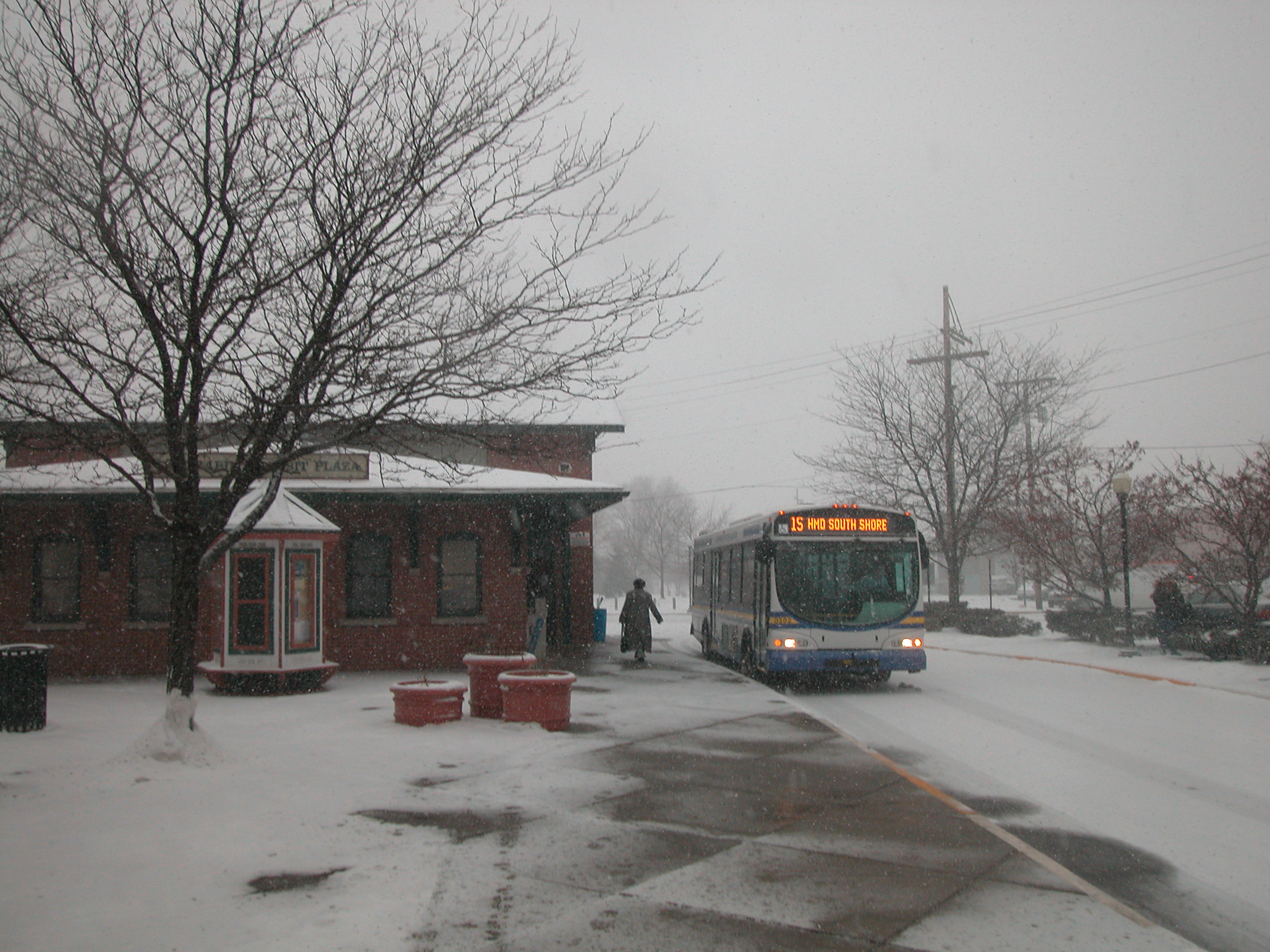
Pace system bus at Dan Rabin Transit Plaza

When RBA assumed control of Hammond Transit System, it rebranded the buses, replacing "Hammond Transit System" labels with "EasyGo" stickers. The system stop signage and system maps retained the original name. While the routes and schedules remain the same for the time being, RBA is looking to make a number of service changes to make the system more efficient and allow for better connections with PACE, East Chicago Transit and GPTC. The tentative plans for creation of two regional routes and three local ones. Route 1 will be revamped as Calumet Regional Route. With a few exceptions, the route will travel along Calumet Avenue, linking Chicago's East Side neighborhood, the city of Hammond and the town of Munster. The new Indianapolis Regional Route will largely follow Indianapolis Boulevard, connecting Chicago's East Side neighborhood, parts of Hammond and East Chicago, terminating in northern Highland. The revamped local routes were not finalized until April 2010. RBA announced its intention to increase service on regional routes during morning and evening rush hours, running the buses once every half an hour. Between January and March 2010, RBA solicited comments and suggestions from the public about what kind of changes it should make. In the end of April 2010, RBA approved the changes. While the public comments resulted in a few alterations, most of the changes are broadly similar to what was originally proposed.

The route changes were originally slated to take effect in July 2010, but they were postponed until August 2010 to give riders more time to familiarize themselves with the new schedule.

=== Northwest Lake County Transit Services ===
On June 28, 2010, RBA executive director Tim Brown explained the changes in detail, expanding on some of the earlier comments and adding a few details. On August 2, the service hours will change, with all buses running between 6:00 AM – 8:00 PM every half-an-hour during morning and evening rush hours and every hour the rest of the day. Saturday service would be restored starting August 7, with all buses running once an hour. The service would be officially renamed Northwest Lake County Transit Services, but the buses will retain the recently added "EasyGo" logos and bus stops and signs will remain the same until further notice. Calumet Regional Route and Indianapolis Regional Route would debut as Red Route and Green Route, respectively. Two local routes, Orange Route and Blue Route, would operate as fixed bi-directional loops, covering some of the destinations previously covered by Routes 1, 3, 4 and 5. The rush hour bus will run between Dan Rabin Transit Plaza and Lake County Government Complex in Crown Point, with inbound buses departing in the morning and outbound buses departing in the evening.

== Hammond Transit Bus Routes ==
- Route 1- Downtown to Chicago East Side
- Route 2- Downtown to Hessville
- Route 3- Downtown to South Hammond
- Route 4- Downtown to Woodmar
- Route 5- Downtown to Columbia Plaza

== EasyGo Lake Transit Service Routes ==
Red Route - Chicago East Side to northern Dyer
Green Route - Chicago East Side to Highland
Blue Route - Downtown Hammond to Hessville
Orange Route - Downtown Hammond to Marktown, East Chicago
Brown Route - Munster Community Hospital to Lake County Government Center
