= Northwest Indiana Regional Bus Authority =

Northwest Indiana Regional Bus Authority was a regional public transit agency operating in Northwest Indiana's Lake and Porter counties. Established in 2000, it was known as Regional Transportation Authority until 2005. The agency is responsible for improving public transit options in Northwestern Indiana by consolidating and modifying existing services and introducing new ones to fill the gaps. Under the current consolidation plan, RBA will eventually assume responsibility for running all existing bus services in Lake and Porter counties. The details of the plan are still under development as of January 2010.

RBA is funded by Northwest Indiana Regional Development Authority until December 2011. If it does not come up with an alternative funding source, the agency and the services it operates will be shut down.

All fixed-route services operated by the RBA were shut down on June 30, 2012. Paratransit service was discontinued at the end of July 2012.

== Services operated by RBA ==
In 2008, RBA partnered up with Gary Public Transportation Corporation to operate three express inter-city routes - Route 12:Tri City Connection, Route 17: South Broadway Express and Route 20: U.S. 30/Lincoln Highway Circular. RBA increased service frequency from an hour to half an hour. Route 12 connects Gary to Hammond Transit System's Dan Rabin Transit Center, allowing commuters to transfer to HTS and PACE buses. Route 17 connects Gary to Merrillville's Century Mall. Route 20 acts as a feeder service four Route 17, connecting riders to shopping destinations throughout Merrillville.

As of January 2010, RBA assumed responsibility for running Hammond Transit System, which serves the cities of Hammond, Indiana and Whiting, Indiana. Originally, the system routes, prices and service frequency remained the same. The only visible indicator of the new ownership were the "EasyGo" stickers applied over all "Hammond Transit System" labels on the buses (the bus stop signage still retains the old name). On August 2, 2010, the RBA revamped the system as EasyGo Lake Transit service, expanding its reach to several Lake County suburbs and adding a new express route that links between Munster and the Lake county government offices at Crown Point.

On February 1, 2010, RBA introduced a new rush hour express bus service between Dyer and downtown Chicago in a manner similar to Valparaiso's ChicaGo Dash. Known as EasyGo Chicago, it makes two trips from Dyer fire station to the Loop in the mornings and two return trips to Dyer in the evenings. The tickets cost $7.50 each way. So far, the ridership has been modest (an average of 17 riders per day). It is funded using RBA funds and a stimulus grant for the first two years. It is unclear how it will be funded once the stimulus funds expire.

RBA is currently considering taking over GPTC transit system and potentially tweaking the routes to make them more compatible with Hammond Transit System routes it already controls. No deal has been finalized as of July 2010.

On June 30, 2012, all routes were shut down and service discontinued.
