= Gary Metro Center =

South Shore Line station in Indiana

Gary Metro
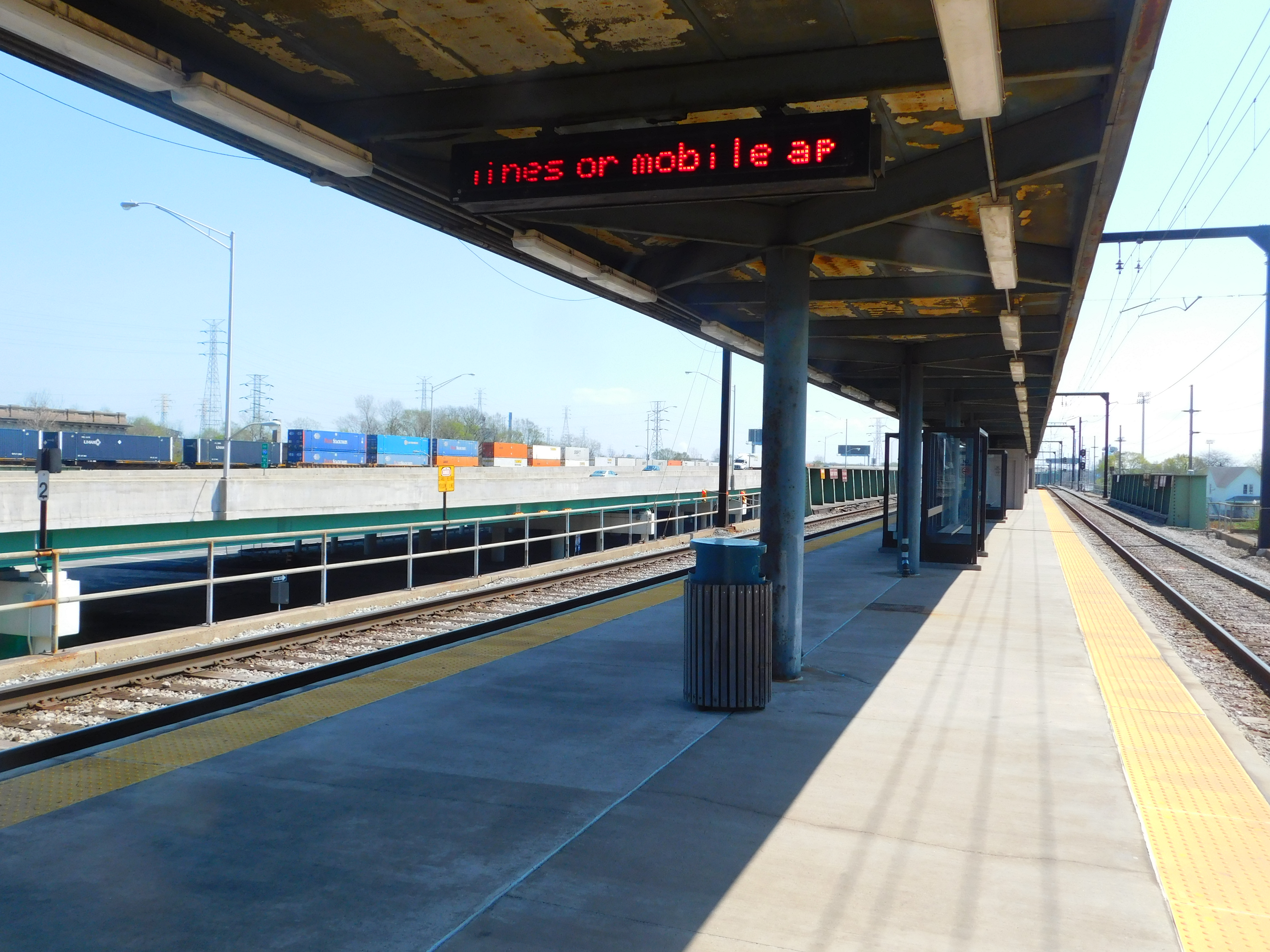
- Metro Center station in April 2016

General information
- Other names: Adam Benjamin Metro Center
- Location: 200 West 4th Avenue; Gary, Indiana
- Coordinates: 41°36′17″N 87°20′18″W
- Owner: The city of Gary, Indiana
- Platforms: 1 low-level island platform
- Tracks: 2
- Connections: Gary Public Transportation Corporation

Construction
- Structure type: Elevated
- Accessible: Yes
- Architect: H. Seay Cantrell Associates

Other information
- Fare zone: 5

History
- Opened: 1984

Passengers
- 2019: 426 (average weekday)

Services
Preceding station	NICTD	Following station
Gary/Chicago Airport toward Millennium Station	Lakeshore Corridor	Miller toward South Bend International Airport
Former services
Preceding station	NICTD	Following station
Ambridge Closed 1994 toward Randolph Street	South Shore Line	Miller toward South Bend Airport
Track layout
Location

Gary Metro Center (also known as the Adam Benjamin Metro Center) is a multimodal commuter hub operated by the Gary Public Transportation Corporation. It was built in 1984 as an elevated replacement of the previously ground-level Broadway Street station. Named in honor of local Representative Adam Benjamin Jr., who died in 1982. It serves as the central bus terminal and the Downtown Gary station on the South Shore Line. It also serves as a stop for Greyhound Lines and other intercity bus systems.

It is one of three NICTD electric train stations in Gary, and serves the Genesis Convention Center and the U.S. Steel Yard baseball park, home of the Gary SouthShore RailCats baseball team. The RailCats's full name, SouthShore RailCats, honors the South Shore Line.

The station is just south of the Indiana Toll Road (I-90) and the disused Gary Union Station. The tracks of the former Baltimore and Ohio (now CSX) and New York Central Railroads (now Norfolk Southern) also lie near the station.

== Structure ==
The station consists of a single elevated low-level island platform with mobile wheelchair lifts to allow passengers with disabilities to board and disembark. The platform can be accessed from the second floor of stairs located adjacent to Broadway as well as via an elevated walkway over a parking lot that connects to the second floor of the station building. The ground floor of the building provides sheltered waiting areas for busses. Surrounding the building lie additional parking.

The second floor used to provide access to an elevated walkway over E4th avenue (US 20) to the south, connecting to the nearby Genesis convention centre, as well as its parking garage. However, this has been closed since 2020 due to structural issues in the garage, and the centre's closure.

The station was designed by Gary-based architectural firm H. Seay Cantrell Associates.

== Bus connections ==
Gary Public Transportation Corporation

Local Routes

- Route L1: West-Central via Grant
- Route L2: Oak/County Line via Aetna
- Route L3: Crosstown Connector
- Route L4: University Park

Regional Routes

- Route R1: R1: Lakeshore Connection
- Route R3: Burr Street and Lake Ridge
- Route R-BMX: Broadway Metro Express

Greyhound Lines

== History ==
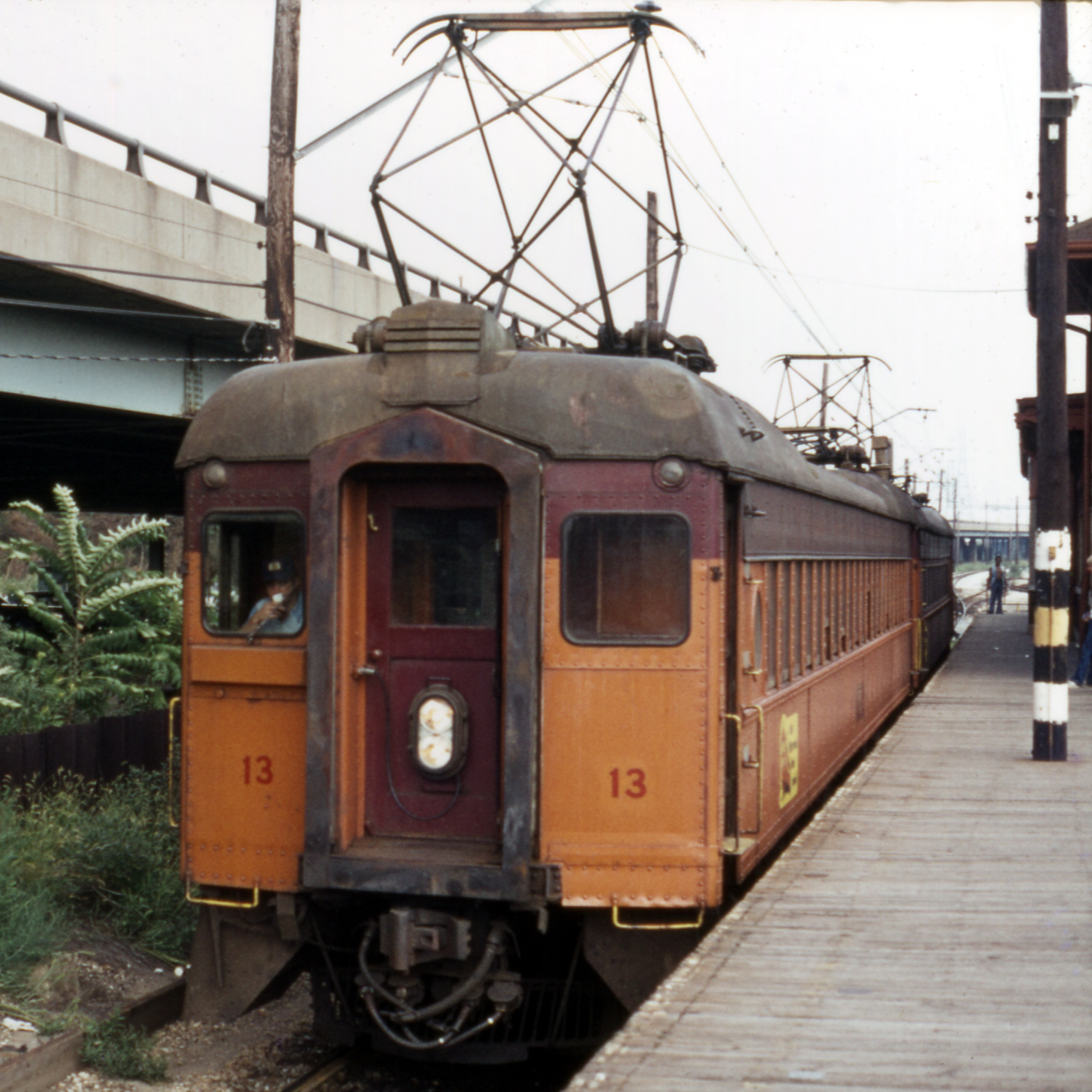
A westbound train at Gary in August 1975

Gary station opened in 1908 as an inaugural stop along the new Chicago, Lake Shore and South Bend Railway; it was located at Broadway and Third, near the United States Steel Corporation plant and several steam railroad stations. The station building had a footprint of 23 by 78 feet (7.0 m × 23.8 m) and featured a tile roof. A 200-foot (61 m) platform, level with car floors, was provided for passengers and freight handling. A storage yard and wye were also provided. It contained a ticket office, waiting rooms, and baggage room. A new station building had replaced the original by the 1950s.

The modern station was dedicated on October 16, 1985.
