= Gary Public Transportation Corporation =

Commuter bus system

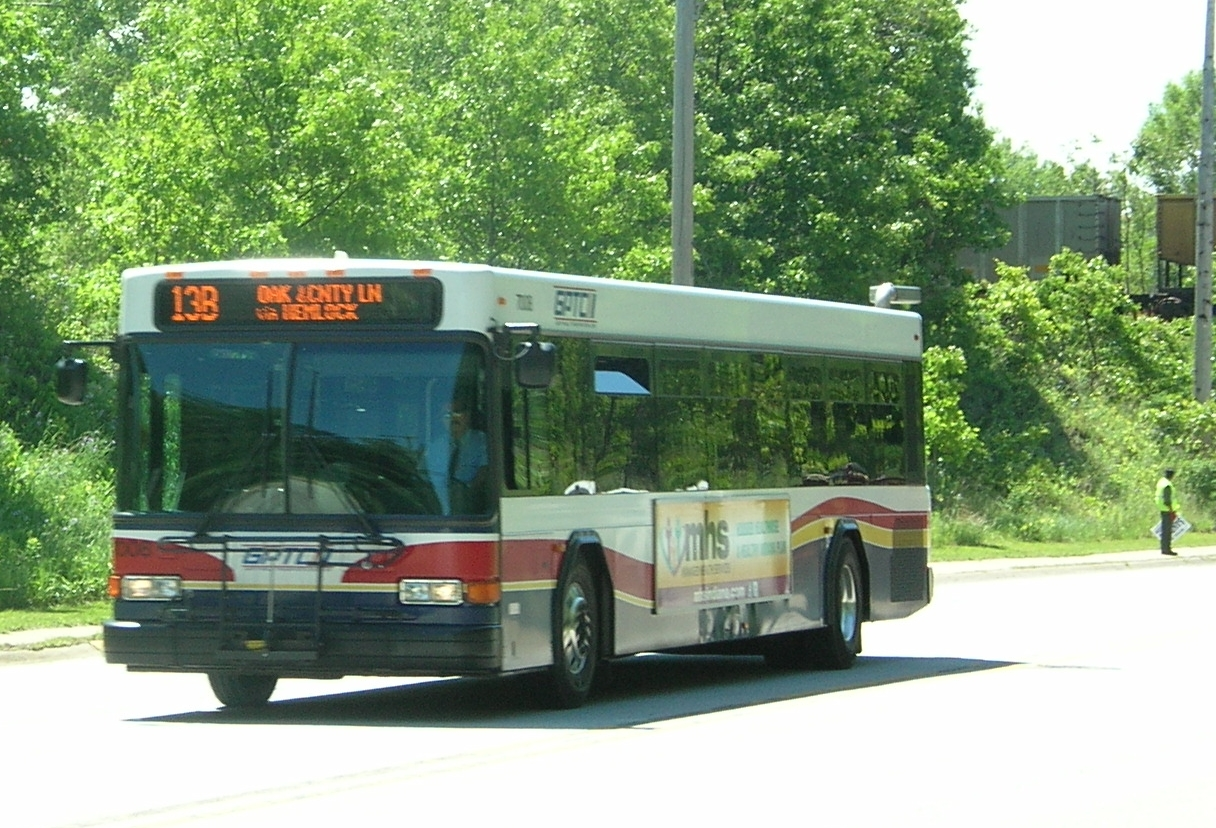
- GPTC bus with bike rack, passing through the Indiana Dunes National Lakeshore in Miller Beach
- Parent: Gary Railways, Inc. (1912-1974)
- Founded: 1974
- Headquarters: Gary, Indiana
- Locale: Gary area and selected inter-city corridors
- Service type: Commuter
- Routes: 11
- Stops: 220
- Hubs: 1
- Stations: 1
- Lounge: Gary Metro Center (third floor)
- Fleet: 30 (+5)
- Annual ridership: 910,170 (+17.06%)
- Fuel type: gasoline and diesel
- Operator: Gary Transit, Inc. & Gary Intercity Lines, Inc.
- Chief executive: Daryl E. Lampkins, General Manager
- Website: Official Site

The Gary Public Transportation Corporation (GPTC) is a commuter bus system in Gary, Indiana that offers service to numerous stops throughout the city and neighboring suburbs. GPTC is a public corporation owned but not directly controlled by the city.

== History ==
The system started out Gary & Interurban Railway Company, a subsidiary of the Chicago – New York Electric Air Line Railroad. Founded in 1908, it operated streetcars and interurban trains throughout Gary and its neighboring suburbs and cities. In 1923, the company was acquired by Samuel Insull's Midland Utilities. By that point, Insull held a virtual monopoly over electrically powered public transit throughout northern Illinois, north Indiana and southwest Wisconsin. However, when Insull's fortunes fell in the wake of the Great Depression, Gary Railways Company was sold off to Chicago & Calumet District Transit Company, which made it a subsidiary.

During the 1940s, the streetcar service was gradually replaced with buses. In 1956, the city and interurban buses were split into Gary Transit Inc. and Gary Intercity Lines Inc, respectively. While Gary Intercity Lines ended its services in 1971, Gary Transit lasted until 1975, when it was reorganized into Gary Public Transit Corporation.

At that point, Gary Public Transportation Company became the operator of the newly created Hammond Transit System. It was forced to cede the service to Hammond Yellow Coach Lines after a judge determined that the company could not operate a system outside Gary city limits. GPTC limited its operations to Gary until 1990, when it inaugurated new express bus routes that originated in downtown Gary and reached into Hammond, East Chicago, Merrillville and Crown Point.

In 2010, Northwest Indiana Public Development Authority announced that it would not provide GTPC any of the funding it provided over the past few years unless the agency signs a memorandum of understanding that signified its willingness to consolidate its operations under Northwest Indiana Regional Bus Authority. GTPC officials voted against the move in July 2010. The agency was unable to fill the funding gap, forcing it to cut routes and decrease service frequencies. The agency is currently contemplating increasing fares and eliminating Saturday service to make up for the budget shortfall.

== Current system operations ==
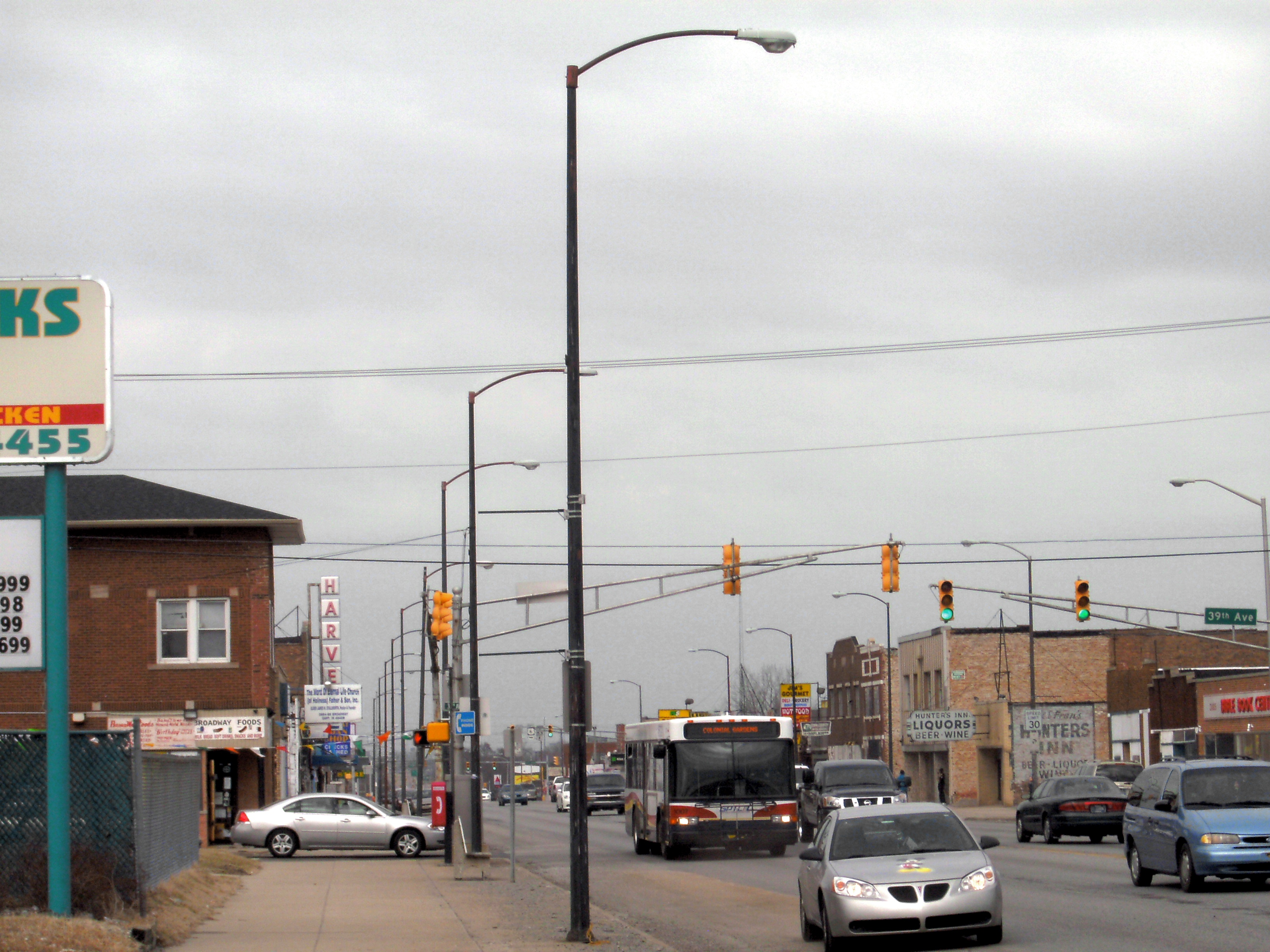
GPTC bus southbound on Broadway.

GPTC primarily serves Gary, with most routes radiating from Gary Metro Center. GPTC also has express service to locations in Hammond, East Chicago and Merrillville, and its service area includes Crown Point and Hobart as well. Gary Metro Center serves as the system's primary hub - it also doubles as a South Shore Line station, connecting riders to destinations in Chicago and Northern Indiana. Route 13 provides service to Miller South Shore Line station. Route 12 connects to Pace bus routes at Dan Rabin Transit Center. It also connects to several East Chicago Transit routes at Indianapolis Boulevard. Curb to curb pickup is available for disabled citizens.

== GPTC Bus routes ==
=== Local routes ===
GPTC defines local routes as those bus lines completely within the corporate boundaries of the City of Gary. Many of these services follow routes that were formerly served by streetcar lines when transit was first established in the Gary area.

- Route L1: Marshalltown/Tarrytown/Crosstown. This east–west route serves far eastern and far western residential neighborhoods, connecting them to other routes via several transfer points.
- Route L2: Oak and County Line. This route serves the Emerson, Aetna and Miller Beach neighborhoods on the east side of Gary. Included on this route are the Miller stop for the South Shore commuter line, downtown Miller Beach, and several public beach areas.
- Route L3: West 6th/Hospital - King Drive. This route serves as a central loop connecting downtown to the neighborhoods of Horace Mann, Tolleston, northern Glen Park and Pulaski.
- Route L4: University Park. This route serves the northern Glen Park neighborhood of Gary as well as the suburban communities of Merrillville and Hobart.
- Route L5: Horace Mann Via Taft St. This route chiefly serves the Horace Mann and West Side neighborhoods.

=== Regional routes ===
When the Gary Public Transportation Corporation was created, service outside of the Gary city limits was suspended. In 1992, GPTC returned regional service to Northwest Indiana with the creation of the Tri-City Connection. By 2005, GPTC served five other communities with three regional routes, providing transit to Crown Point, East Chicago, Hammond, Hobart and Merrillville.

In 2008, GPTC formed a partnership with Northwest Indiana Regional Bus Authority to increase service on these regional routes, reducing headways on the routes in question. When the partnership ended in the summer of 2010, GPTC to cut down non-rush-hour service back to previous levels. GPTC is currently in the process of applying for another grant to restore the service.

In February 2010, GPTC created a fourth regional route, University Park. Routes 12 and 17 only stop at specifically designated stops and have higher-than-standard fares. This service has since been replaced by their rapid bus service, the Broadway Metro Express.

- Route R1: Lakeshore Connection. This route serves the Central Business Districts of Gary, Hammond and East Chicago.
- Route R3: Burr Street & Lake Ridge. This route serves Burr St. and Griffith Plaza in Griffith.
- Route R4: Lakeshore South. This route serves south Hammond and Ridge Road in Munster. It was created to fill a void after the RBA ceased operations. This route connects to route R1 and Pace bus routes 350 and 364. It currently runs weekdays only.
- Route R5: Merrillville Shuttle. Serves residential areas in Merrillville and connects to the BMX.
- Route RBMX: Broadway Metro Express. This route serves the Broadway corridor, including the downtown, Midtown and Glen Park neighborhoods of Gary as well as Merrillville and Crown Point. Only makes limited stops and has bypass lanes at intersections.

=== Shuttle service ===
- Route R2: U.S. 30 Shuttle. This route serves as a feeder for the BMX, providing service to retail and office centers on the U.S. 30 corridor in Merrillville and Hobart.

== See also ==
- List of bus transit systems in the United States
- Broadway Metro Express
