= Black Oak (Gary, Indiana) =

- Neighborhood
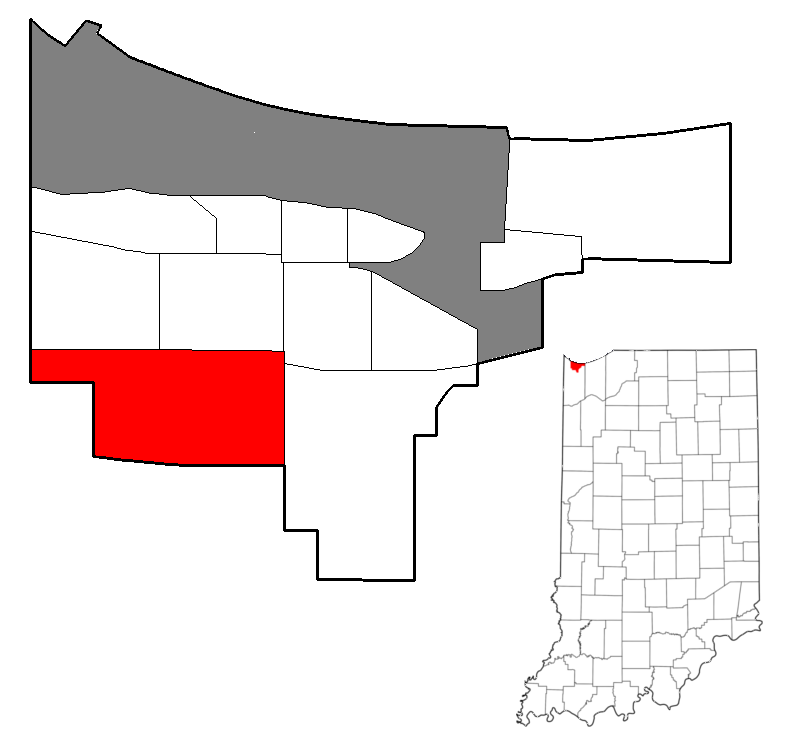
- Location within the city of Gary
- Coordinates: 41.565452°N 87.396802°W
- Country: United States
- State: Indiana
- County: Lake County
- City: Gary
- Annexed by Gary: 1976
- Elevation: 182 m (597 ft)

Population (2000)
  - Total: 4,216
- Time zone: UTC-6 (CST)
  - Summer (DST): UTC-5 (CDT)
- ZIP code: 46408, 46406
- Area code: 219

Black Oak is a neighborhood located on the far southwest side of Gary, Indiana. As of 2000, Black Oak had a population of 4,216, which was 84.7% white. It is Gary's only majority-white neighborhood, and the most recent neighborhood added to the city. Black Oak was annexed in 1976, under the administration of mayor Richard Hatcher. Prior to that, Black Oak had been an unincorporated area informally associated with nearby Hammond, and the area has Hammond telephone numbers.

Located in Gary's southwest corner, Black Oak adjoins the City of Hammond to the west, and the Town of Griffith and unincorporated Calumet Township to the south. The neighborhood's northern boundary is formed by 15th Avenue, just north of Interstate 80; and its eastern boundary is formed by Burr Street and Clark Road. Most of the neighborhood lies within the floodplain of the Little Calumet River.

Because of its former status as an unincorporated region of the county, Black Oak is served by the Lake Ridge Schools Corporation, which also covers Calumet Township, rather than the Gary Community School Corporation. Similarly, it is the only neighborhood in Gary served by a branch of the Lake County Public Library rather than the Gary Public Library. Private schools in Black Oak include Gary Academy and the Black Oak School for the Deaf, both of which are K-12 schools.

The housing stock in Black Oak is dominated by single-family and mobile homes. As of 2000, occupancy was 88%, and owner-occupancy was 70%. Black Oak is the only neighborhood in Gary where mobile homes make up a significant fraction of total housing. Thanks to its late date of annexation, it is also the only neighborhood where most development predates the neighborhood's becoming part of Gary.

Poverty levels in Black Oak are similar to Gary as a whole; a 2005 study found that Black Oak residents faced obstacles to purchasing healthy and inexpensive food that were similar to those facing other Gary residents. Commercial development in Black Oak is concentrated at the neighborhood's eastern boundary along the Burr Street and Interstate 80 corridor.

Black Oak has numerous expanses of wetland and undeveloped floodplain land near the Little Calumet River. It is the site of Lake Etta County Park, the only county park located entirely within Gary; in addition, a bike trail runs along the south bank of the Little Calumet. However, environmental degradation is a serious problem, with frequent illegal dumping. The neighborhood includes Lake Sandy Jo, a Superfund site used as a toxic waste dump from 1967 to 1975, when it was closed by court order. Lake Sandy Jo was fenced off in 1986, and remediation by the EPA was completed in 1994.
