= Prairie Park (East Chicago) =

- Neighborhood
- Interactive map of Prairie Park
- Coordinates: 41°38′N 87°26′W
- Country: United States
- State: Indiana
- County: Lake County
- City: East Chicago

Population (2010)
  - Total: 812
- Time zone: UTC-6 (CST)
  - Summer (DST): UTC-5 (CDT)
- ZIP code: 46312
- Area code: 219

Prairie Park is a neighborhood in the Indiana Harbor section of East Chicago, Indiana. It is bounded on the north by U.S. 12 (Columbus Avenue), and on the south by Indiana 312 (Chicago Avenue). To the west, it looks across Elm Street at the Washington Park neighborhood, and to the east it is bounded by the Cline Avenue expressway and industrial northern Gary beyond.

As of the 2010 United States census, Prairie Park had 812 residents, of whom 46.2% were African American and 48% were Hispanic. The population was down from 946 in 2000. There are approximately 300 homes in the neighborhood.

Prairie Park is known as one of East Chicago's more diverse and affluent neighborhoods. It is home to the Block Middle School, Washington Elementary School, and the main building of the East Chicago Public Library.

== History ==
Prairie Park is one of East Chicago's newest neighborhoods, having been built between the 1960s and 1990s. Like Sunnyside to its north, Prairie Park has suburban-style curved streets, in contrast to the conventional street grid found elsewhere in East Chicago and neighboring cities.

Beginning in the 1960s, the neighborhood was built in three stages on land previously owned by Inland Steel. The development, originally planned to include 600 homes, was managed by the Purdue-Calumet Development Foundation.

The neighborhood was originally intended to house the city's elites. To that end, restrictive covenants prohibited building any homes worth less than $14,000.
