= The Brickyard =

A brickyard is a place where bricks are made and/or stored.

The Brickyard or Brickyard or variation, may refer to:

== Places ==
- Brickyard (East Chicago), a former neighborhood in East Chicago, Indiana, US
- The Brickyard (NC State), a popular nickname for University Plaza at North Carolina State University
- The Brickyard (shopping mall), a shopping mall in Chicago, Illinois, US
- The Brickyard, a nickname for the Indianapolis Motor Speedway
- The Brickyard, a protected tourist attraction adjacent to Menemsha Hills in Massachusetts, US
- Brickyard Cove, Point Richmond, California, USA; a cove
- Brickyard Creek, California, USA; a creek

== Other uses ==
- Brickyard 400, a stock car race held at the Indianapolis Motor Speedway ("The Brickyard")
- BRICKYARD, the callsign of Republic Airways
- "Brickyard" Kennedy (1867–1915), U.S. baseball player

== See also ==
- Pátio do Tijolo (Portuguese: Yard of Bricks), Bairro Alto, Lisbon, Portugal
- Brick (disambiguation)
- Yard (disambiguation)
