= Olympic Steel =

Metals service center

Olympic Steel, Inc.
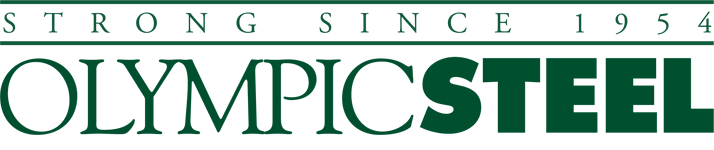
- Type: Public
- Traded as: NYSE: RYZ
- Industry: Steel Processing; Metal fabrication
- Founded: 1954; 72 years ago
- Founder: Sol Siegal; Morris Siegal; Sam Sigel
- Headquarters: Cleveland, Ohio, U.S.
- Key people: Richard T. Marabito (CEO); Michael D. Siegal (chairman); Richard A. Manson (CFO)
- Products: Flat-rolled steel Fabricated metal parts
- Revenue: ▼$1.234 billion (2020)
- Net income: ▼ -$5 million (2020)
- Total assets: ▼$640 million (2020)
- Total equity: ▼$301 million (2020)
- Owner: Ryerson (2026-present)
- Number of employees: 1,626 (2020)
- Website: olysteel.com

Olympic Steel, Inc. is a metals service center based in Cleveland, Ohio. it processes and distributes carbon, coated and stainless flat-rolled sheet, coil and plate steel, aluminium alloy, tin plate, and metal-intensive branded products primarily in the United States.

Metals processing and value added services include tempering, stretch leveling, cutting-to-length, slitting, edging, shearing, blanking, burning, forming, shot blasting, laser punching, plate rolling, fabricating, machining, and welding.

Acquired in May 2011 for $156 million, its subsidiary Chicago Tube & Iron is a distributor of steel tubing, pipe, bar, valves & fittings, and fabricates pressure parts.

== History ==
Founded in 1954 by brothers Sol and Morris Siegel and Sam Sigel, Olympic Steel was initially a metal trading company and owned no facilities. In 1956, it opened an 11,000-square-foot (1,000 m^{2}) facility in Bedford Heights, Ohio.

When its facility had grown to 35,000 square feet (3,300 m^{2}) in 1966, the company offered multiple flat-rolled steel products, including coil and plate products. In 1976, a year after Sol's son Michael Siegal joined the firm, its facility expanded again to 56,000 square feet (5,200 m^{2}).

Michael Siegal bought out his father's share of the company in 1984 and David Wolfort joined the team as the company's first General Manager. By 1985, the company had founded a Southern sales office in Georgia and another office in Pennsylvania.

In 1987, Olympic Steel acquired Viking Steel Company, based in Elk Grove Village, Illinois. In 1988, the Philadelphia Division was formed by moving the Eastern sales office to a full warehouse facility in Lester, Pennsylvania.

In 1989, the Southern Division moved to Greenville, South Carolina, consolidating several sales offices in the region and Olympic Steel Trading was formed to sell steel in Puerto Rico and Mexico. In 1990, the company acquired Eastern Steel based in Milford, Connecticut and Juster Steel of Minneapolis, Minnesota.

In 1995, it acquired Lafayette Steel & Processing based in Detroit, Michigan. In 1996, two years after becoming a public company by selling four million shares in an initial public offering, Olympic sold another 2.5 million shares.

In 1997, in addition to acquiring Southeastern Metal Processing for $17 million, it also broke ground on its second temper mill at a facility in Bettendorf, Iowa. The following year, Olympic entered the machining business by purchasing the assets of JNT Machining for $795,000 and opening a facility in Chambersburg, Pennsylvania.

In June 2006, the company acquired the Siler City, North Carolina–based Tinsley Group (PS&W) for $10 million. In 2008, it announced fabrication facilities to be built in Dover, Ohio and Sumter, South Carolina.

In August 2010, Olympic Steel acquired a 100,000 square foot facility in Mount Sterling, Kentucky for plate burning, machining, forming and shot blasting metals processing services. In May 2011, it acquired Chicago Tube & Iron for $156 million.

In 2011, it acquired a 177,000 square foot facility on U.S. Steel's Gary Works site in Gary, Indiana to house its temper mill and cut-to-length line. In addition, it also opened a 43,000-square-foot warehouse and distribution center in Kansas City.

In June 2012, the firm was named 2012 Service Center of the Year by American Metal Market. In May 2013, Sol Siegal died.

In June 2015, Olympic Steel announced the addition of a new cut-to-length stretcher leveler line at its Winder, Georgia facility. In May 2017, it shut its plant in Siler City, resulting in 51 layoffs. The plant had been acquired from Tinsley Group in 2006.

In April 2018, Olympic acquired the assets of Berlin Metals, one of the largest North American service centers processing and distributing prime tin mill products and stainless steel strip in slit coil form. Effective January 1, 2019, Michael Siegal transitioned from CEO to Executive Chairman and Richard T. Marabito was elected CEO.

In January 2019, the company acquired the assets of McCullough Industries, a branded self-dumping hopper manufacturer in Kenton, Ohio. In April, the company opened a distribution facility in Hanceville, Alabama supplying steel plate and sheet product to the areas.

In August 2019, the firm acquired assets related to the manufacturing of the EZ-Dumper hydraulic dump inserts. In December 2020, it acquired Action Stainless & Alloys.

On February 13, 2026, it was announced that Olympic Steel had completed the merger of its operations with those of Ryerson Holding Corporation, an Illinois-based company that processes and distributes metals whose origins date back to 1842.
