= Calumet (East Chicago) =

- Neighborhood
- Interactive map of Calumet
- Coordinates: 41°37′N 87°27′W
- Country: United States
- State: Indiana
- County: Lake County
- City: East Chicago

Area
  - Total: 0.91 km^{2} (0.35 sq mi)

Population (2013)
  - Total: 3,361
  - Density: 3,700/km^{2} (9,600/sq mi)
- Time zone: UTC-6 (CST)
  - Summer (DST): UTC-5 (CDT)
- ZIP code: 46312
- Area code: 219

Calumet is the portion of East Chicago, Indiana located east of the Indiana Harbor and Ship Canal and south of Chicago Avenue (Indiana State Road 312). The neighborhood is bisected by the Indiana Harbor Belt Railroad. The area west of the tracks is referred to as Calumet proper, or as "West Calumet" (a term also often used specifically for the now-shuttered housing complex at the neighborhood's southwest corner). The area east of the tracks is known as "East Calumet."

Like many East Chicago neighborhoods (including Roxana and Marktown), the residential part of Calumet is surrounded by industrial land: the Indiana Harbor and Ship Canal to the west, the Chicago Avenue industrial corridor to the north, a Citgo tank farm to the east, and the DuPont site and USS Lead site to the south. Beyond its industrial rim, the neighborhood is bounded by the Grand Calumet River and Hammond's Hessville neighborhood to the south, Southside to the west, Indiana Harbor to the north, and the Gary-Chicago Airport to the east.

Notable local attractions include Riley Park, one of the city's largest parks. Riley Park hosts an annual festival known as Calumet Day, which has been held since 1994. The neighborhood is also home to the Carmelite Home for Girls, an orphanage established in 1913 by Maria Teresa of St. Joseph. Many historic churches dot the neighborhood.

Calumet was, for decades, one of the only neighborhoods in East Chicago to welcome African American residents, along with New Addition and North Harbor. That legacy continues today; as of 2013, the neighborhood's population was 71% African American, and 30% Hispanic.

== History ==
Historically, industries in and around Calumet were dominated by the metals industry, particularly lead: U.S. Reduction to the north, a series of lead refineries including International Smelting and Refining Company and Eagle-Picher to the west, USS Lead and Grasselli Chemical Company to the south, and the Cities Service oil refinery to the east. The neighborhood's residential boundaries correspond to Operable Unit 1 of the USS Lead Superfund Site, which was designated in order to address environmental contamination from these industries.

In 2016–2017, Calumet lost more than 1,000 people, approximately a third of its population, when the city government abruptly closed the West Calumet Housing Complex after it became public that soil samples from the complex contained more than 90,000 parts per million of lead. Although the contamination had been known to city officials for decades, the hasty and chaotic closure of the complex scattered residents across the Chicago metropolitan area, many being forced to accept lodgings in other heavily contaminated communities such as Altgeld Gardens. The Carrie Gosch elementary school was shuttered at the same time, although school officials had known of the contamination since at least 2014.
