= Brickyard (East Chicago) =

- Neighborhood
- Location within Indiana
- Coordinates: 41°37′59″N 87°27′42″W
- Country: United States
- State: Indiana
- County: Lake County
- City: East Chicago
- Time zone: UTC-6 (CST)
  - Summer (DST): UTC-5 (CDT)
- ZIP code: 46312
- Area code: 219

The Brickyard was a neighborhood in the Indiana Harbor section of East Chicago, Indiana, near the intersection of Kennedy Avenue and Gannister Court. It stood for much of the 20th century, housing approximately 30 primarily African American families, until the City of East Chicago demolished it in the mid-1990s due to contamination from the adjacent Pollution Control Industries (PCI) hazardous waste mixing facility.

== History ==
The homes of the Brickyard were originally built in the 1920s as housing for laborers at a nearby brickyard. This arrangement was common in East Chicago in the early 20th century because residential land was extremely scarce, and workers sometimes had to commute from as far away as Chicago if their employers could not provide housing. But because of this ad-hoc arrangement, the Brickyard neighborhood was never zoned for residential use.

Despite the lack of residential zoning, the Brickyard homes were subsequently sold to private buyers, and additional homes were built there in the 1950s and 1960s. By the time the neighborhood was evacuated in the 1990s, many residents had been living there for decades.

In 1986, PCI began to operate adjacent to the Brickyard, having been encouraged to move there by the city government. Residents were never notified of PCI's arrival or the hazards that living next to such an operation could create. The facility expanded until it was separated from the neighborhood's homes only by a chain-link fence, but the expansions were never discussed with the community. The company contributed heavily to local politicians including mayor Robert Pastrick.

During the early 1990s, residents had to be evacuated from the Brickyard multiple times due to fires and explosions at the PCI site. On one occasion, blue snow fell across the neighborhood. Despite numerous residents' complaints about unsafe practices and emissions from the facility, PCI continued in operation through a combination of bribery of local officials and obtaining advance warning of impending inspections by the state regulatory agency, the Indiana Department of Environmental Management.

Following extensive local media coverage, the City of East Chicago evacuated the Brickyard in 1995 by designating it a redevelopment site and using the power of eminent domain to buy residents out. The neighborhood was demolished under the pretext of slum clearance. The buyout was funded by a Community Development Block Grant.

The Brickyard is one of several East Chicago neighborhoods to have been entirely depopulated as a result of toxic contamination, a pattern that continued in 2016 with the evacuation of the West Calumet Housing Complex.

PCI continues to operate on and around the former site of the Brickyard, now as part of the Tradebe Group. The site of the Brickyard neighborhood was used for a treatment laboratory and warehouse facility.
