= North Harbor (East Chicago) =

- Neighborhood
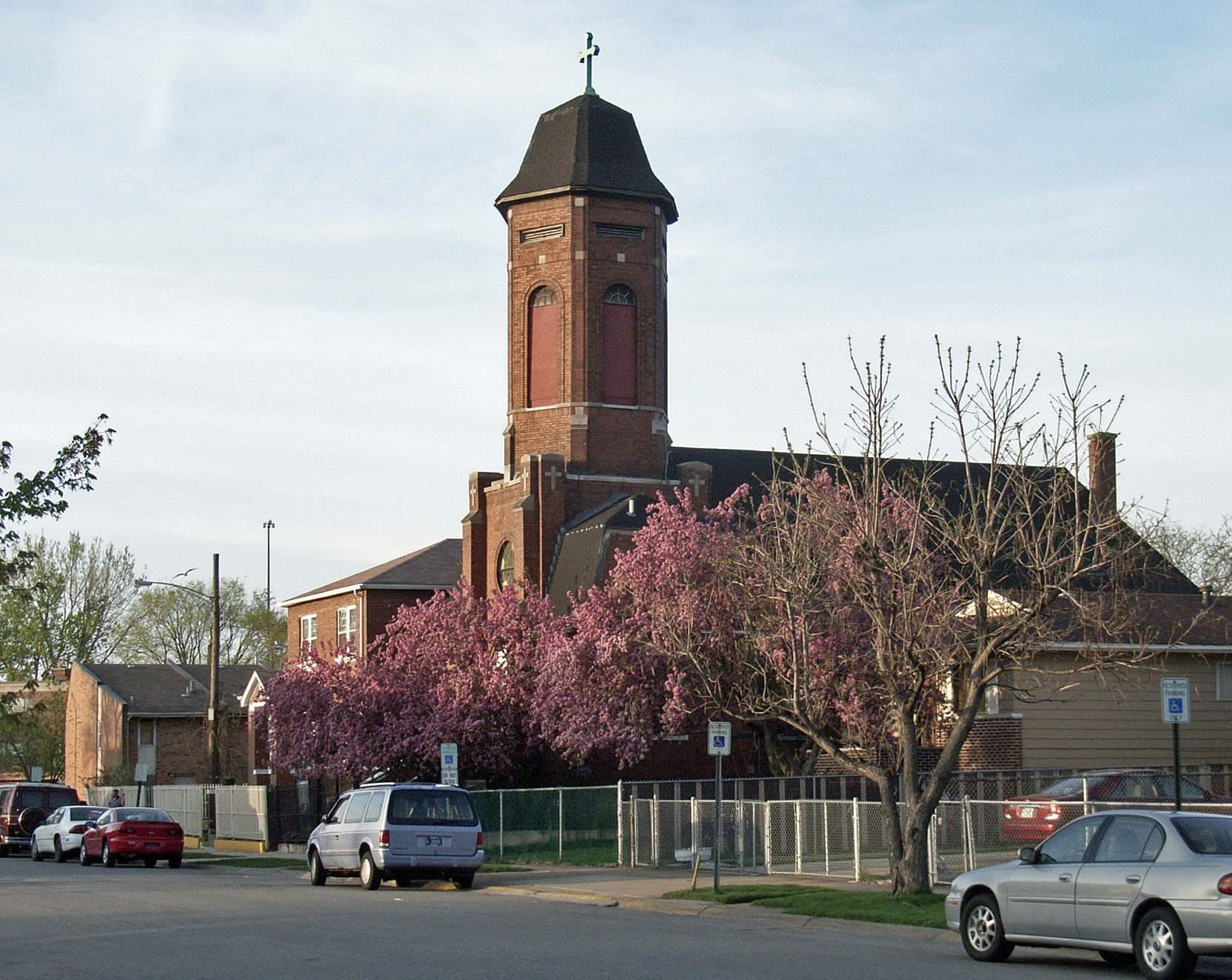
- A church building in North Harbor
- Interactive map of North Harbor
- Coordinates: 41°39′N 87°27′W
- Country: United States
- State: Indiana
- County: Lake County
- City: East Chicago

Population (2010)
  - Total: 2,818
- Time zone: UTC-6 (CST)
  - Summer (DST): UTC-5 (CDT)
- ZIP code: 46312
- Area code: 219

North Harbor is a neighborhood in northeastern East Chicago, Indiana. It constitutes the portion of the Indiana Harbor section north of 138th Street. The neighborhood is home to one of the highest concentrations of affordable housing in the United States.

The north end of North Harbor's residential area is just south of East Chicago's marina district, home to the Ameristar Casino East Chicago, the Jeorse Park beach, and the East Chicago marina. As of 2016, city plans called for the construction of a pedestrian overpass that would enable North Harbor residents to walk to the marina district by 2022. Beyond the marina district lies the vast manmade peninsula that houses the Indiana Harbor Works operated by ArcelorMittal.

== History ==
The now-demolished lakefront area of North Harbor was historically one of the few neighborhoods in East Chicago open to African American settlement. Today, the neighborhood's residents are approximately 44% Hispanic and 53% African American.

Dating to the early 20th century, North Harbor was originally platted and built to provide housing for workers at East Chicago's steel mills near to their workplaces. More recently, the neighborhood's recent history has been shaped by a series of ambitious redevelopment projects. The Purdue-Calumet Development Foundation started urban renewal work in North Harbor in 1960. By 1968, the project had pushed 1,528 families out of their homes. Meanwhile, the construction of the Cline Avenue bypass cut off pedestrian access from North Harbor to the lakefront. More recently, in the early 2000s, the administration of Mayor Robert Pastrick pushed forward an ambitious public housing project that was the subject of sharp criticism by Pastrick's successor George Pabey. Pabey in turn, however, obtained $1.9 million in federal funding to revitalize the neighborhood, particularly the commercial district around Main and Broadway. A notable result of these investments is that, even as local incomes have plummeted with the decline of industrial employment, the population density of the neighborhood has held steady.

Notable historic structures in North Harbor include the Indiana Harbor Public Library, a Carnegie library built in 1913.
