= Washington Park (East Chicago) =

- Neighborhood
- Interactive map of Washington Park
- Coordinates: 41°38′N 87°27′W
- Country: United States
- State: Indiana
- County: Lake County
- City: East Chicago

Population (2010)
  - Total: 1,459
- Time zone: UTC-6 (CST)
  - Summer (DST): UTC-5 (CDT)
- ZIP code: 46312
- Area code: 219

Washington Park or Park Addition is a neighborhood in the Indiana Harbor section of East Chicago, Indiana, near the city park with which it shares its name. It is bounded on the north by U.S. Route 12, and on the south by 144th Street.

== History ==
In the earliest years of the 20th century, the East Chicago Company subdivided the 70-acre Washington Park tract and built homes there. But because of the neighborhood's remoteness from local industry. and the tendency of the basements to flood, the homes proved difficult to sell. In 1910, Fred J. Smith and Martin Hausler (a local banker and civil engineer respectively) formed the Washington Park Land Company with the goal of transforming Washington Park into an exclusive residential subdivision for the local elites.

As the neighborhood's remoteness transformed from a liability to an asset, living there became a symbol of environmental privilege. The land company used restrictive covenants to prevent racial and ethnic minorities from moving in, and set a minimum home value of $2000 to prevent poor people of any race from moving in. The developers advertised Washington Park as the “only restricted subdivision in Indiana Harbor.” The land for the later Washington Park was set aside, but the park was not actually built until after the homes. The land company used its growing political clout to steer public improvements, such as sewer and water lines, to the neighborhood.

Early investors in the neighborhood included figures associated with the feared "Indiana Harbor mob," which was linked to the Al Capone syndicate in Chicago as well as to John Dillinger. These figures included Lake County judge William Murray and East Chicago attorney Hymie Cohen.

Several adjacent north–south streets in the neighborhood are named for trees and plants, including the fir, elm, and deodar. The street now known as Grand Boulevard was once likewise named Grapevine Street, but its name was changed to "Grand" as increasing numbers of local elites settled along it.

== Works cited ==
- Tamsen Song Anderson (2009). Negotiating Life at the Urban Periphery: The Development of the Industrial Suburb of East Chicago, Indiana, 1850-1950 (Ph.D. thesis).
