= Sunnyside (East Chicago) =

- Neighborhood
- Interactive map of Sunnyside
- Coordinates: 41°38′21″N 87°26′24″W
- Country: United States
- State: Indiana
- County: Lake County
- City: East Chicago

Area
  - Total: 0.3 km^{2} (0.12 sq mi)

Population (2013)
  - Total: 324
  - Density: 1,100/km^{2} (2,800/sq mi)
- Time zone: UTC-6 (CST)
  - Summer (DST): UTC-5 (CDT)
- ZIP code: 46312
- Area code: 219

Sunnyside is a neighborhood in easternmost East Chicago, Indiana, in the Indiana Harbor section near Cline Avenue. It is unique among East Chicago neighborhoods for its suburban character, including a curvilinear street grid. The population is 55% African American and 42% Hispanic. The neighborhood has one of the highest rates of owner-occupied homes in the city.

The neighborhood was built over the first half of the 20th century by Inland Steel as employee housing. The first 100 houses, brick duplexes housing 200 families, were built in 1918. Another 100 units were built in the 1940s in response to the post-World War II housing shortage. Inland Steel retained ownership, renting the homes to employees, until 1969 when it began selling them off. Some additional homes were built in the 1970s.

Notable people from Sunnyside include basketball coach Gregg Popovich and venture capitalist Tim Draper.
