= USS Lead Superfund Site =

Superfund site located in East Chicago

Coordinates: 41.61755°N 87.46355°W

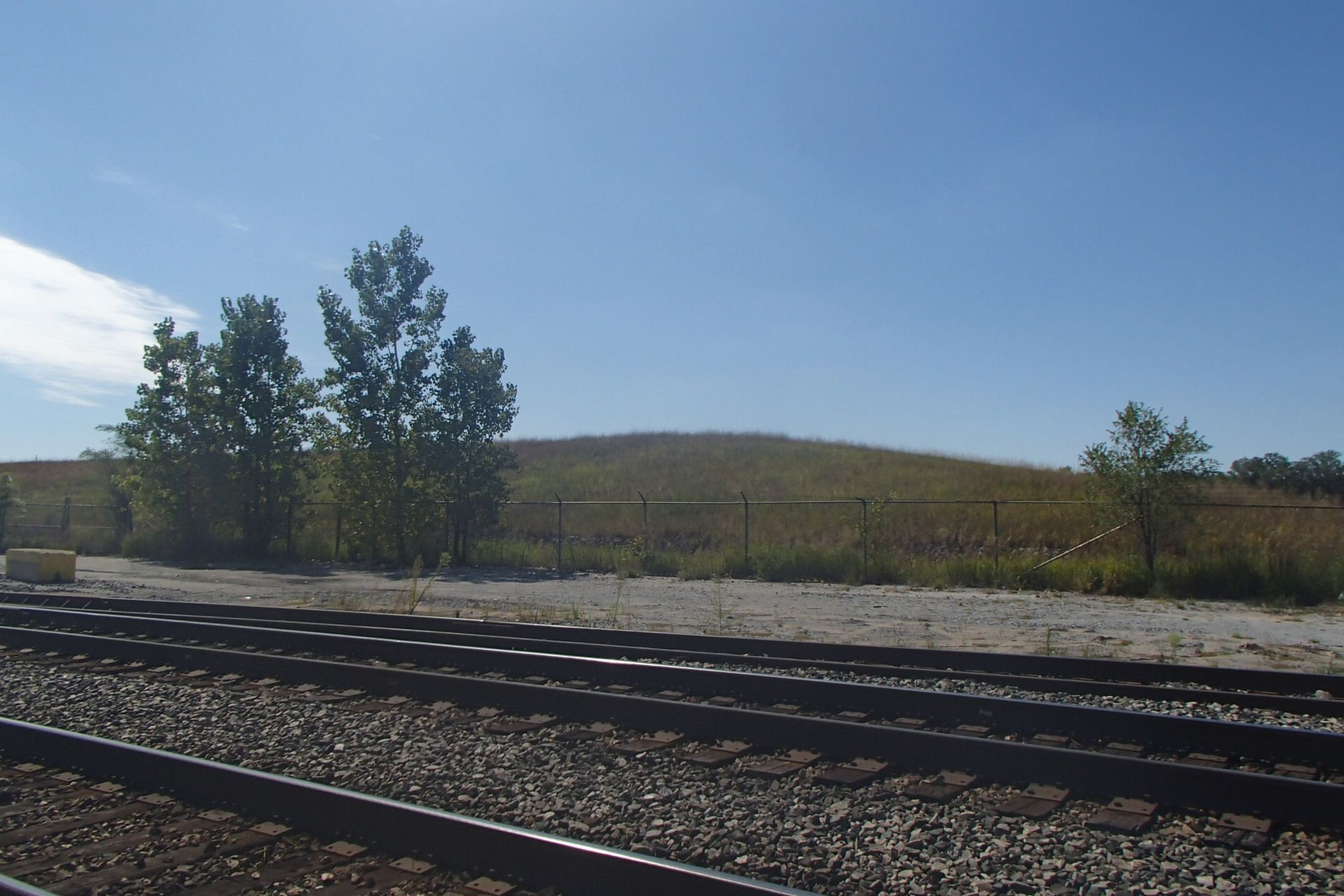
Location of the former USS Lead smelter in Operable Unit 2 of the site.

The U.S. Smelting and Lead Refinery Inc. site, commonly known as USS Lead, is a superfund site located in East Chicago, which is located in northwest Indiana. The site includes part of the former USS Lead facility along with nearby commercial, municipal, and residential areas. Originally the site was used as a lead ore refinery with the surrounding businesses at the time performing similar operations. Through a history of redlining and racial discrimination brought on by the 1920 Urban Renewal Campaign, it is seen that East Chicago's minority community is subject to the consequences of the contamination and has led to claims of environmental racism. The primary contaminants of concern for this area are lead and arsenic, both of which when in the human bloodstream, cause numerous health effects. The site is currently undergoing testing and remediation. This Superfund site is broken down into two Operable Units. The first, OU1, has been divided into three zones, these being the public housing complex and residential properties. OU2 includes soil at the former USS Lead facility, as well as groundwater in and around the site.

== Background ==
The USS Lead Superfund Site is the location of a culmination of environmental pollution by numerous sources in East Chicago. Initially, from 1893 to 1912, there was a DuPont facility, processing various metals and chemicals. This DuPont facility was joined in 1912 by the Anaconda Copper Company which refined lead and produced lead pigment which was used in paint. South of the Anaconda Company from 1920 to 1985 was the USS Lead plant, which smelted mined ore to refine it for various uses. In 1973 USS Lead switched from refining ore to salvaging lead out of batteries and scrap metal.

In 1970, the Anaconda Company was demolished and replaced by the residential West Calumet Housing Complex (WCHC). The choice to construct housing on this contaminated land was a result of East Chicago's urban renewal campaign, which began in the 1920s following an influx of Hispanic and Black workers during World War I. The main entity responsible for the campaign was the Purdue University-led Purdue-Calumet Development Foundation. According to scholar Elizabeth Browning of the University of Oklahoma, the renewal plan brought in a combination of "racially restrictive covenants and other discriminatory practices." These practices forcibly displaced minority communities in an effort to "eliminate urban blight." To do so, it was believed that the "slums" had to be "completely eradicated". At this time, the United States Census found that nearly 80% of East Chicago's population was Latin American or African American, with 90% of the considered "subpar housing" being occupied by African Americans.

A large advance in the urban renewal project occurred with the passing of the Housing Act of 1954. The act used federal funding to subsidize East Chicago's renewal plans by almost two-thirds of the project's total costs. With this the Purdue-Calumet Development Foundation drafted two new projects: The Indiana Harbor Urban Renewal Project and the West Calumet Urban Renewal Project. The site chosen for the WCHC was the old industrial site of the Anaconda Company. The former industrial site was met with skepticism from the start with officials being unsure the site would "prove safe for any form of residential housing". Much of West Calumet had zoning designations for heavy industry, and the minority residents did not have the political power needed to change this designation. According to Browning, "this strategic employment of zoning indirectly facilitated residential segregation – preserving much of the area for low-income African American and Latinx housing".

From 1970 to 2019 thousands of families lived in the WCHC, all being exposed not only to the remanent contamination of the Anaconda Company site but also the ongoing pollution by the USS Lead site (until 1985) and the other surrounding active industries. 2018-2023 census data showed the continued majority of marginalized community in East Chicago, 38% of the population being Black and 54% being Hispanic. Almost 30% of the East Chicago community is considered to be in poverty. Due to this history of housing discrimination and unfair exposure to environmental hazards, scholar Sophie Rasof of Lake Forest College has deemed this WCHC crisis as an example of environmental racism. The discriminatory housing policies implemented in the 1920s continued to have a lasting impact on how East Chicago's demographic geography was assembled. Rich affluent whites were located in the cleaner renewed part of the city and minority communities were displaced to industrially contaminated land. A resident explained that "We call it environmental racism; we've been forced to live in the poisoned area". Families of the WCHC were shocked to find out in 2016 that they had been living on land highly contaminated with lead and arsenic. However, these were not new findings. Research done by Kate Walz and Emily Coffey, Director of Litigation and Attorney for the Shriver Center, found that in 1985, 53 children were found have lead poisoning. Further, in the 1990s it was found that 40% of children who lived in the WCHC had elevated blood lead levels. This knowledge and intentional refusal to address the problem is further supported by the 1990s EPA tests finding that the emissions of USS Lead at the time were 8 times higher than emission standards.

== Superfund Site Details ==
The site includes part of the former USS Lead facility along with nearby commercial, municipal, and residential areas. The site is made up of two areas called "operable units" (OU). Operable units are broken down based on how the land was used, in this case OU1 is residential and OU2 was industrial. OU1, is a 322-acre residential area that has East Chicago Avenue on the north, East 151st Street on the south, the Indiana Harbor Canal on the west and Parrish Avenue on the east. OU2 is the former USS Lead facility on 151st Street.

At this time, the EPA has not begun remediation on OU2, but has come to an agreement with the company to perform a remedial investigation and feasibility study.

== Products ==
The USS Lead site began as a facility that processed and refined metals and chemicals, including lead and arsenic, which are now the primary contaminants of concern for the area. Then the site was converted to a secondary smelter; where the facility began recovering lead from scrap metal and automotive batteries. The site had been owned by other similar companies prior to this that performed the same type of industrial work.

== Types of contaminants and hazards ==
There are two primary contaminants on the site, those contaminants are lead and arsenic. These contaminants are widespread across the area and are found in the soil and groundwater. Exposure to these can cause a series of health related issues, especially in children due to their size and that they are still developing.

Arsenic: Arsenic affects numerous organs and systems including- Skin, nervous system, respiratory system, cardiovascular system, liver, kidney, bladder and prostate, immune system, endocrine system, developmental processes, and even death.

Lead: Chronic lead exposure can result in- increased blood pressure, decreased fertility, cataracts, nerve disorders, muscle and joint pain, memory or concentration problems, and developmental disorders in children. There are no safe levels of lead.

The main types of contamination found on the site were Lead and Arsenic. These metallic elements are easily dispersed to the environment, where they can then unknowingly enter the human body causing numerous health effects.

Due to the refinery at the DuPont Site, Anaconda Copper Company and the USS Lead Plant, lead and arsenic were a consistent pollutant produced from these factories. According to the National Institute of Environmental Health Sciences, this pollution was possible because "lead in fumes from metal smelting, battery manufacturing, and some factories became airborne and then mixed with soil". Lead gasoline was not banned until 1996 causing additional contamination, however the bulk of pollution came from the refineries just north of the WCHC site. As seen with the WCHC, children are much more susceptible to elevated lead blood levels and lead poisoning, simply due to their innate curiosity. According to the World Health Organization (WHO), children "and their age-appropriate hand-to-mouth behavior results in their mouthing and swallowing lead contaminating or lead coated object, such as contaminated soil or dust". The WHO also says that children can "absorb 4-5 times as much ingested lead as adults from a given source", increasing the likelihood of elevated lead blood levels. Lead pollution is easily transferable between the outdoors and indoors, the CDC (Centers for Disease Control and Prevention) says, "lead-contaminated soil particles can also be brought inside as lead dust or on shoes, clothing, or pets".

The lead contamination brought on by these refineries was known well before any action was taken to mitigate the effects on residents of the WCHC site and the eventual demolition and clean-up effort. According to scholar Enrique Saenz of the Indiana Environmental Reporter: "The U.S. Environmental Protection Agency first found evidence of lead contamination from the U.S. Smelter and Lead Refinery Inc. site, located just across a street from the West Calumet Housing Complex, in 1980". Further soil tests in 1985 revealed the area was beyond the "confines of the USS Lead facility site with more than 1,100 milligrams per kilogram of lead, an amount hundreds of times more than the current state lead action level". In 2014, two years before WCHC demolition, the EPA found some levels to be "as high as 91,000 parts per million of lead in the soil", with the EPA threshold for cleanup being 400 parts per million. A 2021 report published by the National Library of Medicine found that the WCHC "had the widest range in concentration" of soil lead, "with 90% of samples containing soil lead concentrations classified as elevated as assessed using the intended guidance level of 150 mg/kg".

Blood testing done by the Indiana Childhood Lead Prevention Program in 1990 and 1997 on children living in the WCHC found that nearly 31% of children had blood levels higher than the 10 microgram per deciliter. Prior to 1992 it was also found that 40% of children under age 6 has the same blood level exceedance of 10 microgram per deciliter. This is well above the CDC's Blood Level Reference Value for lead of 3.5 microgram per deciliter. There is no safe level of blood lead concentration, meaning all lead contamination should be taken seriously.

Elevated lead blood levels can lead to numerous detrimental health effects. Children are especially susceptible to lead exposure due to their still developing bodies. Common health effects of lead blood levels below 10 micrograms per deciliter include affects to brain development, IQ reduction, reduced attention span, antisocial behavior, anemia, hypertension, renal impairment, immunotoxicity, decreased kidney function, increased blood pressure, or degenerative disorders of the central nervous system. Effects of lead blood levels above 15 micrograms per deciliter can be cardiovascular effects, nerve disorders and fertility problems. In extreme cases according to the WHO, "at high levels of exposure to lead, the brain and central nervous system can be severely damaged causing coma, convulsions and even death". Findings by The CDC say that lead can be stored in the bones of the human body and it can take decades for those stores to dissipate. The neurological and behavioral effects of lead are believed to be irreversible.

Elevated arsenic blood levels according to the WHO, are associated with immediate effects such as vomiting, abdominal pain and diarrhea, numbness and tingling of extremities and muscle cramping. Skin pigmentation can change and skin lesions or hard patches can be observed, all of which may be a precursor of skin cancer. Longer terms of exposure may also cause lung and bladder cancers, diabetes, pulmonary disease and cardiovascular disease. Both lead and arsenic can be linked to detrimental pregnancy outcomes and infant mortality, due to the ease of blood crossing the placenta to the fetus.

After the mayor of East Chicago declared an evacuation order for the residents of the WCHC, the current tenants were "issued tenant protection vouchers to help relocate to a safe home", says James Gastner and Veronica Gaitán of The Urban Institute. However, the eviction of residents from their long-term homes came with multiple problems: "Many residents remained in the complex beyond the target date officials set for evacuation, in part because of the limited rental units available in East Chicago and some landlords' refusal to accept government vouchers". These residents were forced to move across state lines, which resulted in the loss of jobs and Medicaid coverage, as well as school changes for children. The forced removal of families from their homes only added to the health effects of elevated lead. Residents with mental and physical health problems only worsened from the stress. It was also found that relocation "can create problematic readjustment periods for children", negatively affecting cognitive, social, emotional and behavioral development.

== Remediation efforts ==
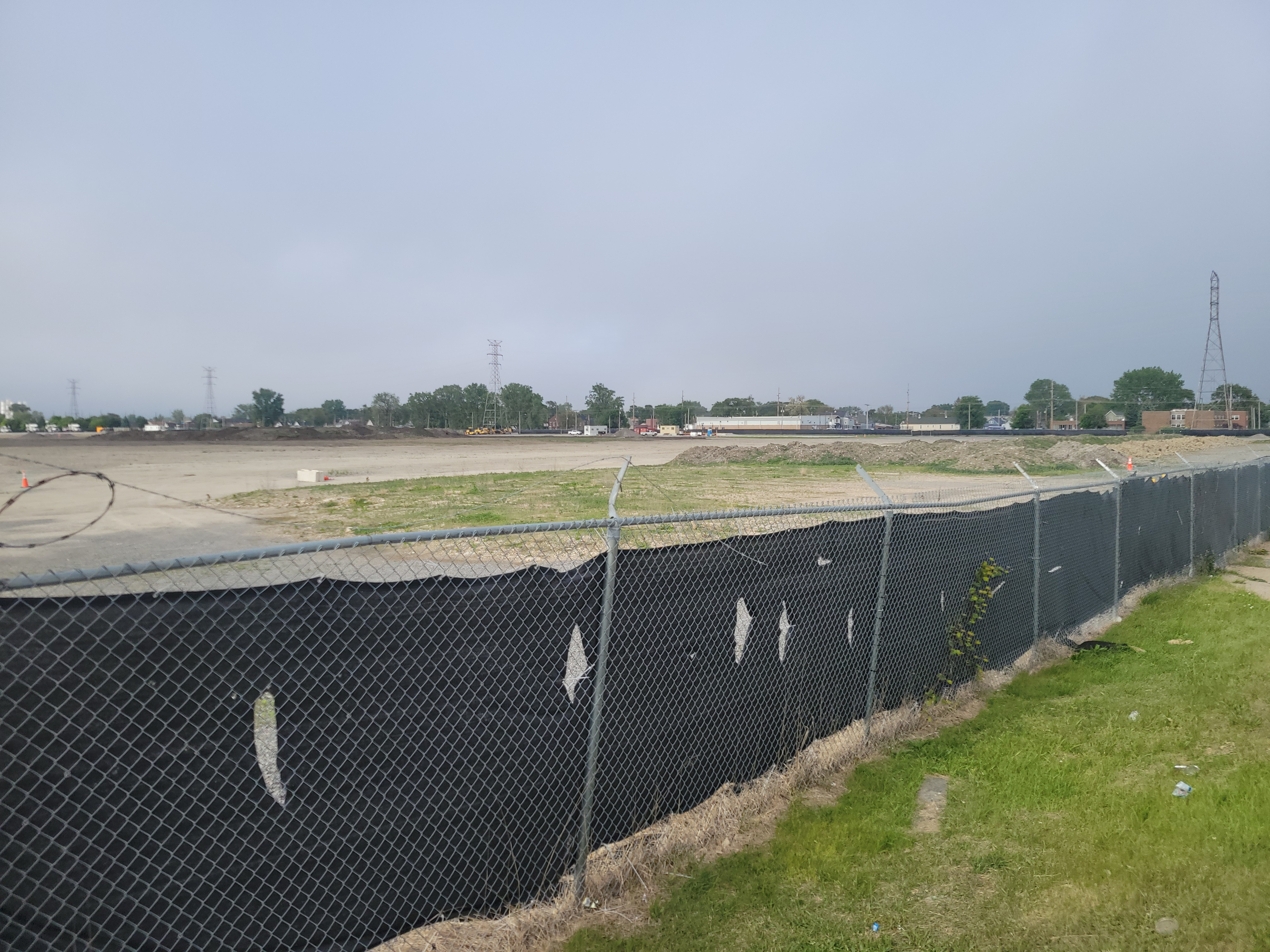
View across the former site of the West Calumet Housing Complex in 2026.

The USS Lead site was added to the Superfund National Priorities List in 2009, after years of proposals and testing. According to the EPA, an agreement has been reached for the continued cleanup of the Site. The EPA and the State of Indiana have identified several responsible parties. The parties include United States Metals Refining Company who owned the USS Lead Facility, Atlantic Richfield Company who owned the Anaconda Facility, and the Chemours Company who owned the DuPont facility. Under the Administrative Settlement Agreement and Order on Consent (ASAOC), these responsible parties will reimburse the EPA "$18 million for its past cleanup costs at the site, and pay for future state and EPA oversight costs". The EPA plans to enter into a Prospective Purchaser Agreement (PPA) with Industrial Development Advantage (IDA) of East Chicago LLC, who will continue the clean-up efforts of the site.

The remediation starts with taking a sample of the soil and ground water, from there workers will dig up and remove contaminated soil, about 2 feet deep, and replace it with clean soil, including 6 inches of topsoil. Then they will put sod on the clean soil. The soil will then be taken to a licensed landfill for proper disposal. The sites will then be monitored for additional hazards. All work will be done at no cost to the homeowner. The site is expected to be finished cleaning by summer 2024.

After demolition of the West Calumet Housing Complex in 2019, the City of East Chicago made an agreement with the IDA, calling for the development of a warehouse and transportation center. According to reporter Rebecca Thiele of NPR, to allow for this new development the zoning classification changed from residential to light industrial, meaning the site "won't be cleaned up to stricter, residential standards and people who were forced to move out of the housing complex, can't move back". East Chicago had initially told residents of the WCHC that the site would become housing again after clean-up was finished. This has led to multiple lawsuits being filed in state and federal courts. Marilyn Odendahl of The Indiana Lawyer says the plaintiffs are "seeking damaged for physical and neurological injuries". The plaintiffs "allege public and private officials knew about the toxic mess for years before telling the public", a claim that is supported by the EPA findings in 1985 of elevated lead levels. Other claims include that the "manufacturing defendants failed to reveal the full extent of the contamination". Residents of the WCHC are upset that the state continued to build the WCHC on land that was known to be contaminated, and despite this knowledge allowed residents and their children to live on the land. Exposing them to high levels of lead and causing a "myriad of disorders and health problems".
