= Brickyard Creek =

Stream in California, U.S.

Coordinates: 40.1703°N 122.2348°W

Brickyard Creek is a stream in the U.S. state of California. The steam runs 9 miles (14 km) before it empties into Reeds Creek.

Brickyard was so named for a brick factory near its course.
