= Ryerson (company) =

American metals company

Ryerson Holding Corporation
- Company type: Public company
- Traded as: NYSE: RYZ; Russell 2000 Component
- Industry: Steel
- Founded: 1842
- Headquarters: Chicago, Illinois, United States
- Key people: Edward Lehner, CEO
- Products: Stainless steel Carbon steel Aluminum
- Production output: 1,897,000 tons
- Revenue: ▼US$3.167 billion (2015)
- Operating income: ▲US$108 million (2015)
- Net income: ▲ -US$1.8 million (2015)
- Total assets: ▼US$1.556 billion (2015)
- Total equity: ▼ -US$141 million (2015)
- Owner: Platinum Equity (66%)
- Number of employees: 3,600 (2017)
- Website: www.ryerson.com

Joseph T. Ryerson & Son, Inc. is a services company that processes and distributes metals, with operations in the United States, Mexico, Canada, and China. Founded in 1842, Ryerson is headquartered in Chicago and employs approximately 4,200 employees at about 100 locations.

== Current operations ==
In addition to the United States, Ryerson has operations in Canada, China, and Mexico. Foreign operations accounted for less than 12% of total revenue in 2015.

== History ==
The company was founded in 1842. In the early 1900s, when Ford Motor Company started producing vehicles, Ryerson supplied it with steel. In 1935, the company merged with Inland Steel Company. In 1946, the company owned a plant in Los Angeles, California, its first plant on the West Coast. In 2005, the company acquired Integris Metals. In 2007, the company was acquired by Platinum Equity. In 2014, the company went public via an initial public offering.

The old Ryerson Steel mill at 18th Street and Rockwell Avenue in Chicago was purchased by the Lagunitas Brewing Company in 2012.
