= Gary Works =

Largest steel mill complex in North America

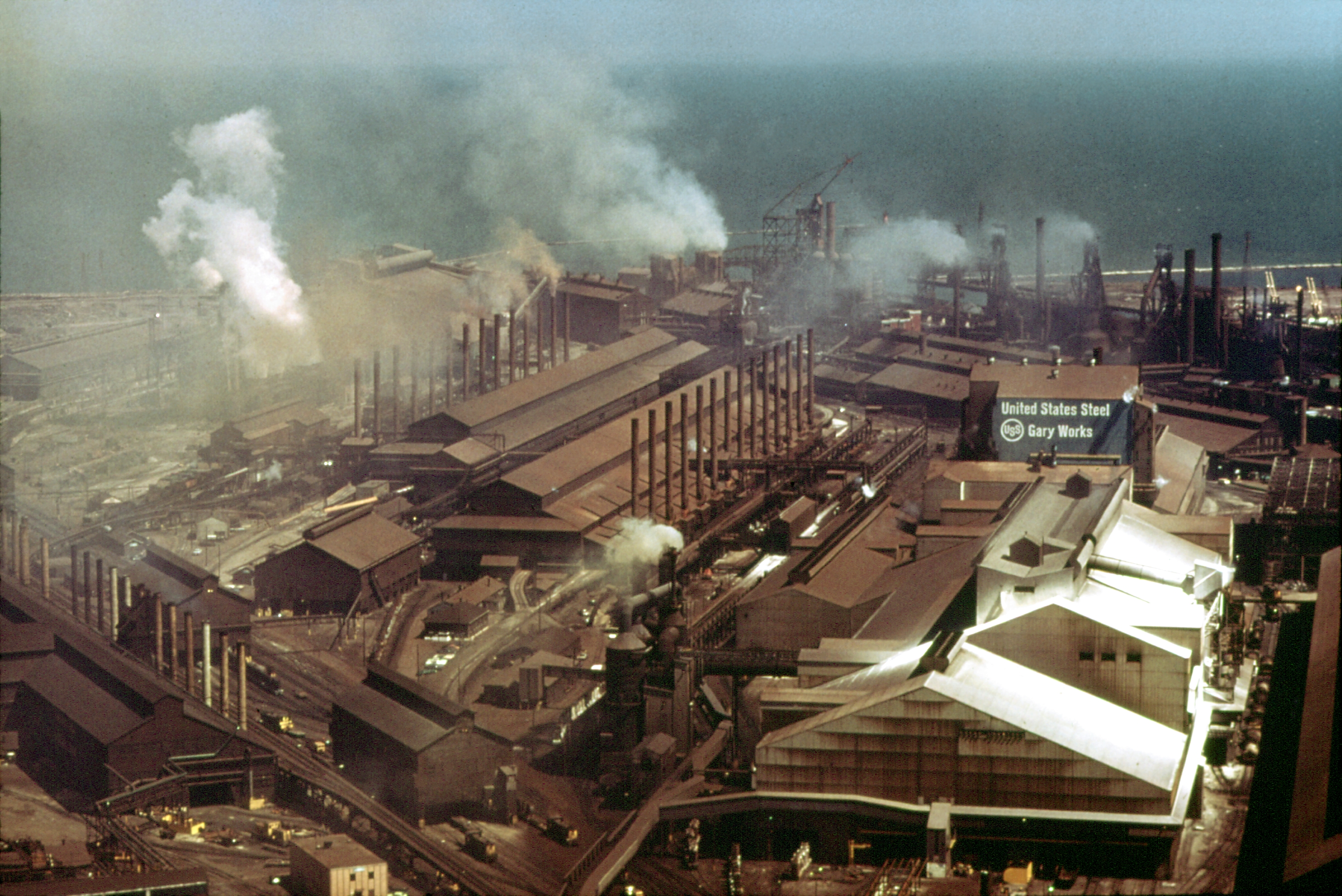
- Aerial view of the Gary Works in 1973
- Built: 1906
- Operated: June 28, 1908
- Location: Gary, Indiana, U.S.
- Coordinates: 41°36′26.1468″N 87°20′15.2664″W
- Industry: Steel
- Employees: 2,256 (2023)

The Gary Works is a steel mill in Gary, Indiana, on the shore of Lake Michigan. For many years, the Gary Works was the world's largest steel mill, and it remains the largest integrated mill in North America. It is operated by U.S. Steel.

The Gary Works includes both steelmaking and finishing facilities as an integrated mill, and has an annual capacity of 8.2 million tons. It contains:

- Four blast furnaces
- Three top-blown basic oxygen process (BOP) vessels
- Three bottom-blown BOP (Q-BOP) vessels
- Vacuum degasser
- Three ladle metallurgy facilities
- Four continuous slab casters
- An 84-inch hot strip mill
- Hot-rolled temper mill
- 80- and 84-inch pickle lines
- A 52-inch six-stand and an 80-inch five-stand cold-reduction mills
- Electrolytic cleaning line
- Three batch annealing facilities
- A 38-inch continuous annealing line
- An 80-inch one-stand, a 48-inch two-stand, and an 84-inch two-stand temper mills
- A 48-inch two-stand double cold-reduction mill
- A 37-inch and a 46-inch electrolytic tinning lines
- Pig iron caster

The Gary Works was under construction from 1906 to 1908, and the first shipment of iron ore was unloaded on June 23, 1908. About 11 million cubic feet (310,000 m^{3}) of sand were moved in the process of constructing the plant.

The Gary Works remains Gary's largest single employer and a key element of the city's tax base, but employment levels have fallen substantially since the mid-20th century; the plant and allied facilities employed over 30,000 people in the early 1970s, but only 6,000 in 1990, 5,000 in 2015, 2,500 in 2021, and 2,246 in 2023. The plant is also a central part of the city's geography; its main entrance is at the northern end of Broadway, the city's main thoroughfare.
