= New Addition =

- Neighborhood
- Interactive map of New Addition
- Coordinates: 41°38′27″N 87°27′50″W
- Country: United States
- State: Indiana
- County: Lake County
- City: East Chicago

Population (2013)
  - Total: 263
- Time zone: UTC-6 (CST)
  - Summer (DST): UTC-5 (CDT)
- ZIP code: 46312
- Area code: 219

New Addition, also called West Harbor, is a small triangular neighborhood in the Indiana Harbor section of East Chicago, Indiana, west of Kennedy Avenue, east of the Indiana Harbor and Ship Canal, and north of United States Route 12. As of 2013, it was home to approximately 263 people.

Like several other East Chicago neighborhoods including Marktown and Roxana, New Addition is wholly surrounded by industrial land. It is home to a small park, a community center, and a branch campus of Ivy Tech Community College.

Built in the early 20th century, the neighborhood originally provided housing for steelworkers in the nearby mills, particularly American Steel Foundries. In the 1920s, it was one of the few neighborhoods available to African American residents in East Chicago. As a result, it was targeted in 1959 for demolition in the name of urban renewal. The neighborhood was saved from demolition by local activists including Rev. Vincent L. McCutcheon.

The view from much of the neighborhood is dominated by petroleum storage tanks associated with the Whiting Refinery.
