= Reeds Creek =

Stream in California, U.S.

Coordinates: 40.1722°N 122.2279°W

Reeds Creek is a stream in the U.S. state of California. The 20-mile (32 km) long stream is a tributary to the Sacramento River.

Reeds Creek was named after Captain Elbridge Gerry Reed, an early settler. Variant names were "Read's Creek" and "Reed Creek".
