= Indiana Harbor Public Library =

- U.S. National Register of Historic Places
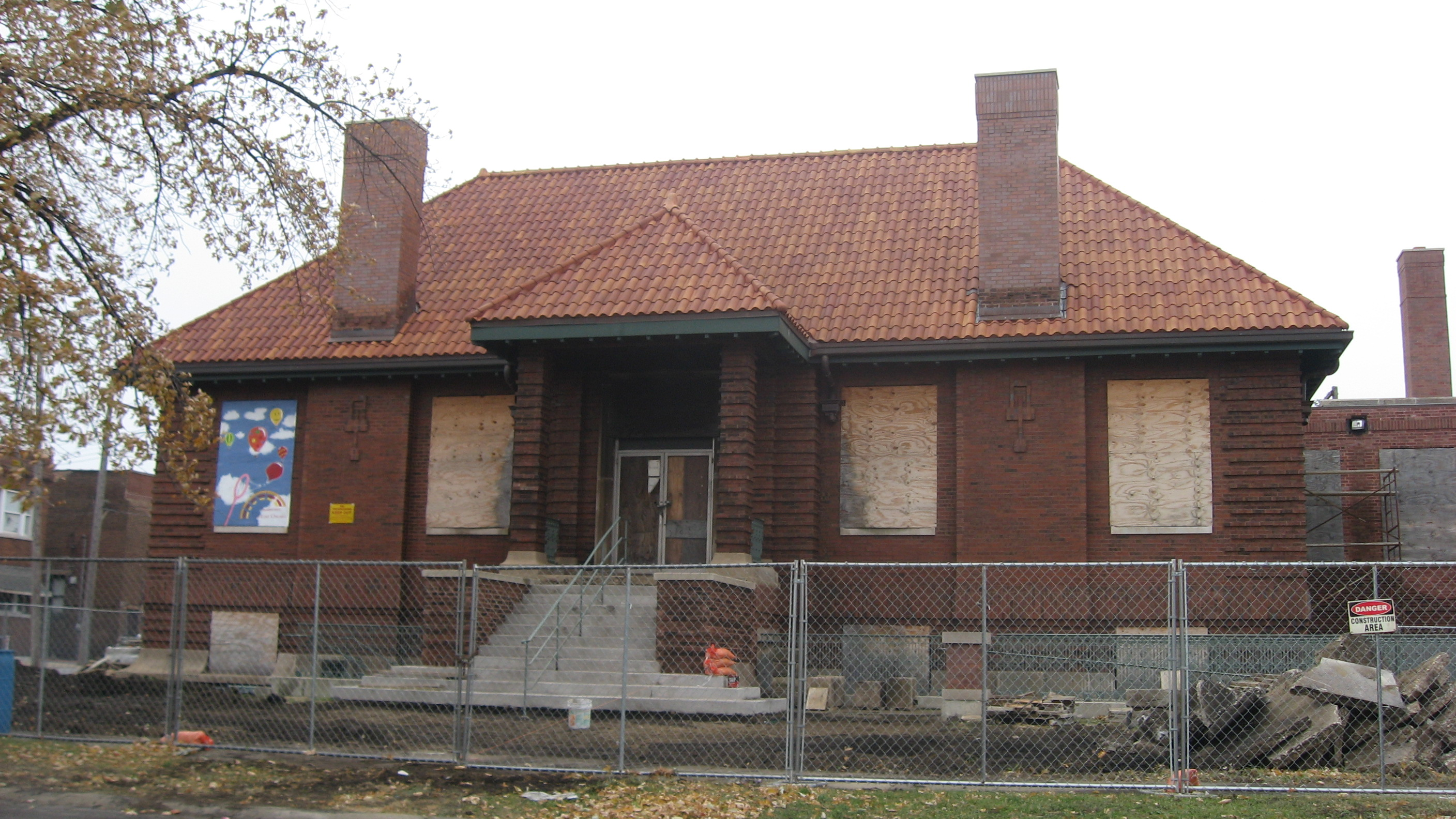

- Location within Indiana Location within the United States
- Location: 3605 Grand Blvd., East Chicago, Indiana
- Coordinates: 41°38′51″N 87°26′56″W
- Area: less than one acre
- Built: 1913
- Architect: Robinson, Argyle E.
- Architectural style: Bungalow/craftsman
- NRHP reference No.: 05001014
- Added to NRHP: September 15, 2005

Indiana Harbor Public Library, also known as Grand Boulevard Carnegie Library, is a historic Carnegie library located at 3605 Grand Boulevard in East Chicago, Indiana. It was built in 1913, and is a one-story, Arts and Crafts style brick building on a raised basement. An addition was constructed in 1931. The building has a clay tile hipped roof and an entry porch supported by square brick columns. The building was constructed with a $20,000 grant from the Carnegie Foundation.

The library was abandoned in 1983, and its interior woodwork plundered. The property was listed in the National Register of Historic Places in 2005. Since 2005, efforts have been made by the City of East Chicago Department of Redevelopment and the Carnegie Performing Arts Association to save the building and begin a $4-million renovation.

== See also ==
- National Register of Historic Places listings in Lake County, Indiana
- List of Carnegie libraries in Indiana
