= Temper mill =

Steel processing line

A temper mill is a steel sheet or steel plate processing line composed of a horizontal pass cold rolling mill stand, entry and exit conveyor tables and upstream and downstream equipment depending on the design and nature of the processing system.

The primary purpose of a temper mill is to improve the surface finish on steel products.

== Components ==
A typical type of temper mill installation includes entry equipment for staging and accepting hot rolled coils of steel which have been hot wound at the end of a hot strip mill or hot rolled plate mill. Also included in a typical temper mill installation are pinch rolls, a leveler (sometimes two levelers), a shear for cutting the finished product to pre-determined lengths, a stacker for accumulating cut lengths of product

Sometimes a temper mill installation includes a re-coil line where the finished product is a coil instead of bundles of cut lengths of product. Maximum product flexibility capability could be attained if the installation was arranged to produce both coils and bundles of cut to length product.

The heart of the temper mill is the cold rolling mill stand which produces the temper pass. It will include electric powered drive motors and speed reduction gearing suited to the process desired. The design of the rolling mill can be a 2-high or 4-high (even 6-high in some cases). The mill stand can be work roll driven or back up roll driven. The mill can be designed with hydraulic work roll bending or back up roll bending. Installations typically have a single rolling mill stand, but may have two. Pinch rolls provide back tension for the pay off reel in the entry section and entry and exit tension for the temper pass.

== Function ==
The process goal is physical property enhancement through cold forming of the steel product in the bite of the work rolls. The physical properties that are enhanced by the temper pass due to elongation of the product include:

- Dimensional trueness and repeatability
- Suppression of yield point elongation
- Improved product surface finish
- Improve product shape and flatness
- Decrease coil memory
- Increase product yield strength
- Develop proper stiffness or temper

Typical elongation produced in the product is 0.5% to 2%. Product dimensions vary. Thicknesses include typical sheet metal gauges up to 1.00" thick plate. Widths vary from 36" to 125".

The finish of the rolled product is controlled by using rolls having a variety of surface finishes designed to impart the desired finish to the product. Roll finishes range from ground and polished rolls to impart a bright finish, to shot-blasted or electric-discharged textured rolls that produce a dull, velvety finish on the steel surface.

Typical auxiliary equipment includes PLC based controls, overhead traveling cranes, roll changing equipment, roll grinding equipment, hydraulic power unit(s), bundle lifting devices, Coil handling devices, etc.
