= Indiana Harbor (East Chicago) =

- Neighborhood
- Interactive map of Indiana Harbor
- Coordinates: 41°39′N 87°27′W
- Country: United States
- State: Indiana
- County: Lake County
- City: East Chicago
- Time zone: UTC-6 (CST)
  - Summer (DST): UTC-5 (CDT)
- ZIP code: 46312
- Area code: 219

Indiana Harbor or The Harbor is the portion of East Chicago, Indiana, located east of the Indiana Harbor and Ship Canal, as opposed to "East Chicago proper" which is located west of the canal. It contains several distinct neighborhoods, including New Addition, Sunnyside, and North Harbor. The Calumet neighborhood is also east of the Canal but sometimes considered distinct from "Indiana Harbor proper".

Although Indiana Harbor has never been a separate town, it has often been referred to as one since its establishment in 1901. Historically, Indiana Harbor was more working-class than East Chicago proper, with a population dominated by workers at Inland Steel and related plants. Rivalries between Indiana Harbor and the rest of East Chicago are common.

Mexican-American settlement in Indiana Harbor began during the steel strike of 1919. By 1928, Indiana Harbor was home to one of the largest Mexican-American communities in the Midwest. The neighborhood has retained a substantial Mexican population, and hosts an annual Mexican Independence Day parade.

Historic structures in the neighborhood include the Indiana Harbor Public Library, a Carnegie library which was added to the National Register of Historic Places in 2005. The main East Chicago Public Library is also located in Indiana Harbor.

Notable people from Indiana Harbor include federal judge Gonzalo Curiel.
