= East Chicago, Indiana =

- City
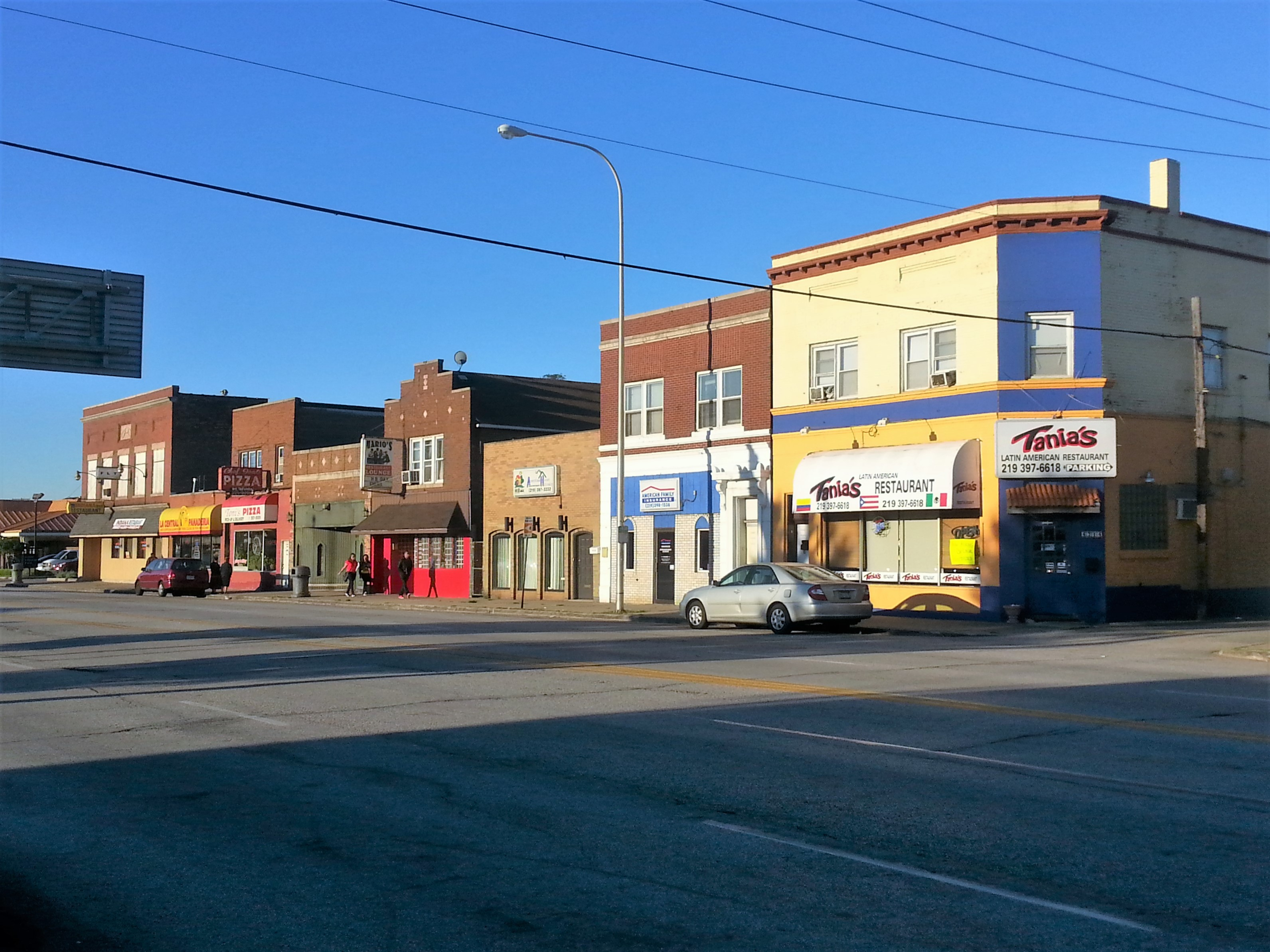
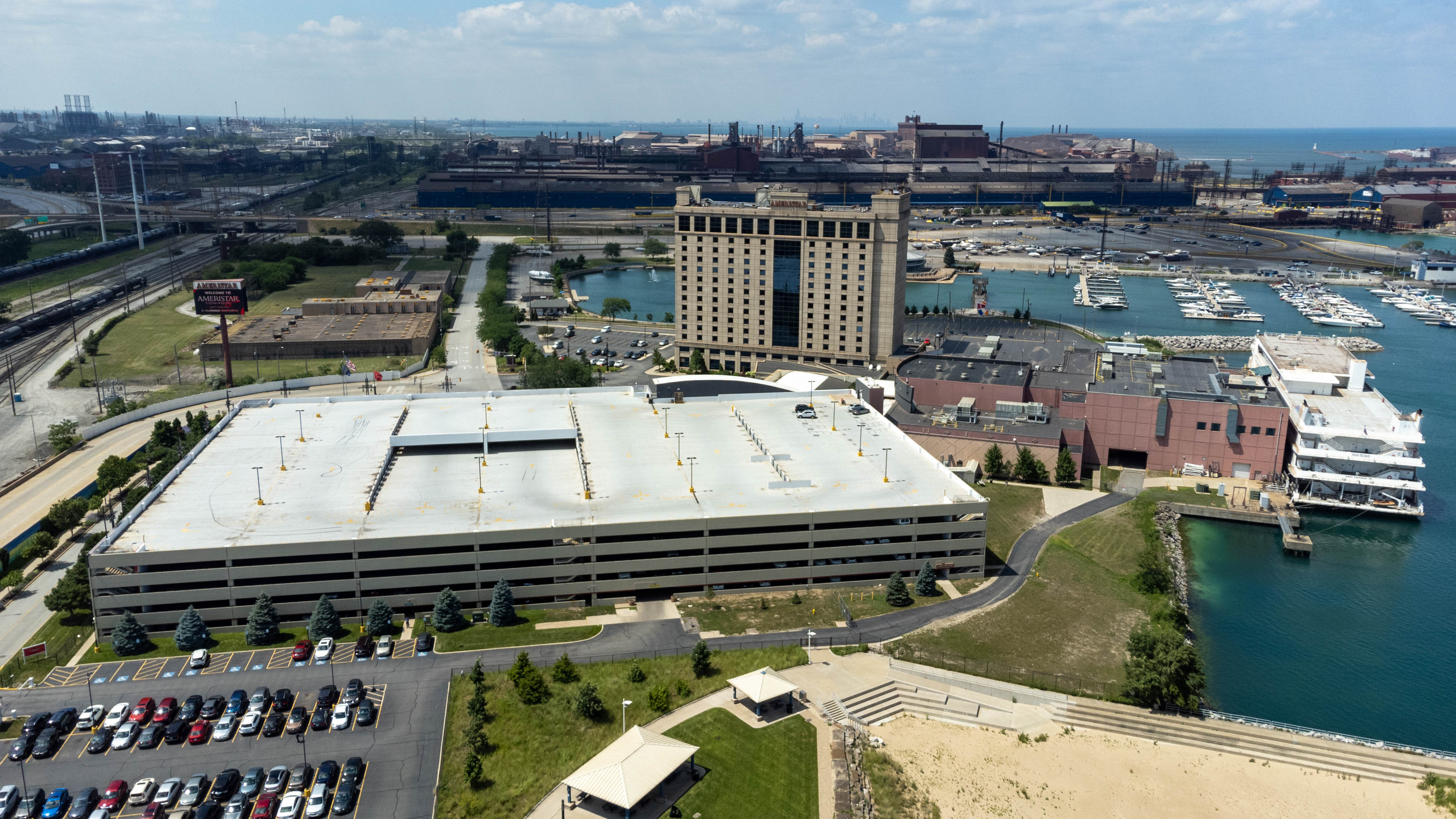
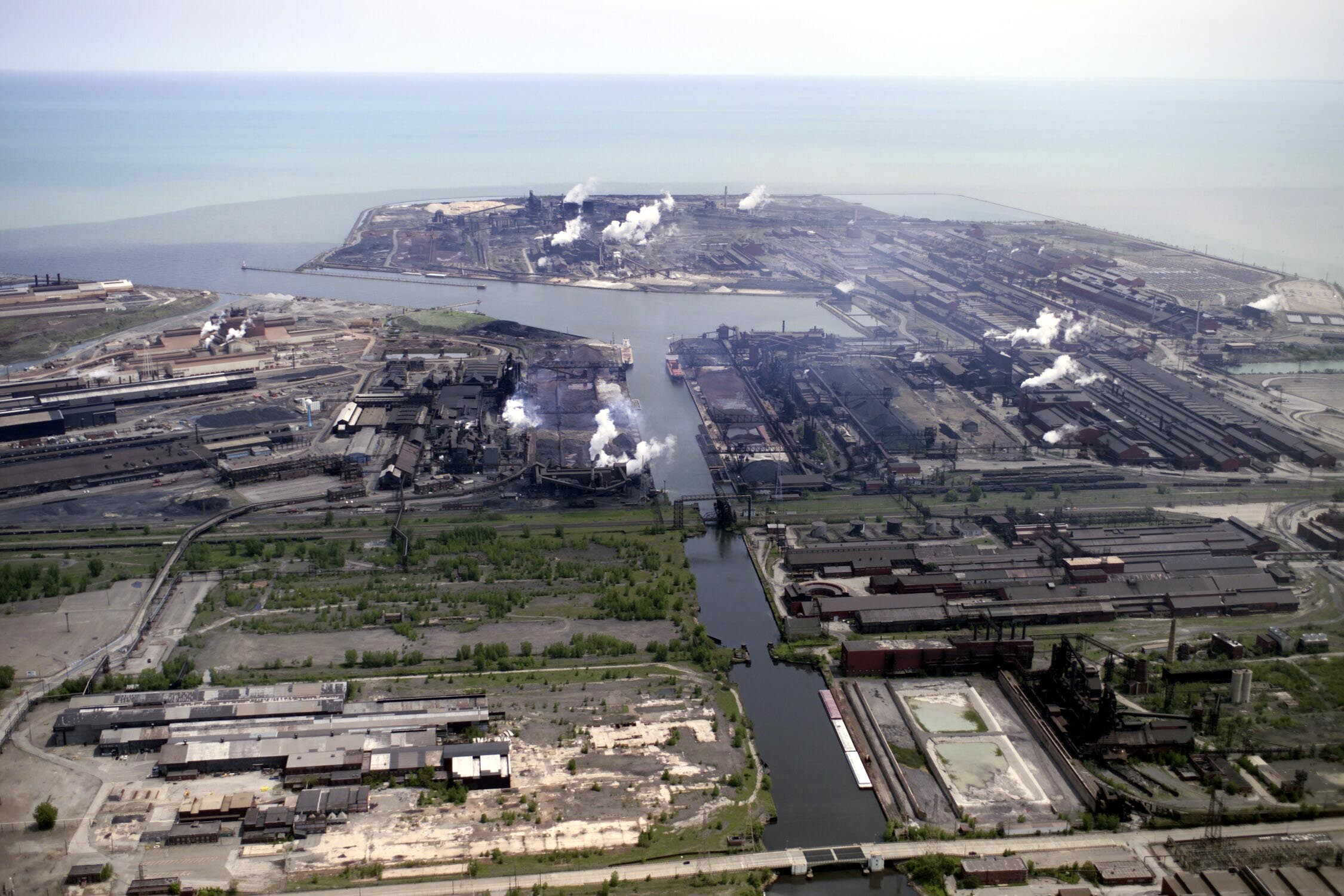
- Downtown East Chicago Ameristar Casino Indiana Harbor and Ship Canal

- Flag Seal Logo
- Nicknames: Indiana Harbor, The Harbor, E.C., The Twin City (East Chicago & Indiana Harbor neighborhoods – used in the early 1900s).
- Motto(s): "Progredemur" (We Progress) and A City of Hope and Progress
- Location of East Chicago in Lake County, Indiana.
- Coordinates: 41°38′20″N 87°27′34″W
- Country: United States
- State: Indiana
- County: Lake
- Township: North
- Incorporated (Town): 1889
- Incorporated (City): 1893

Government
  - Type: Mayor-Council
  - Mayor: Anthony Copeland (D)
  - City Council: Members: Richard Medina (D, AL); Kenneth Monroe (D, AL); Emiliano Peres (D, AL); Myrna Maldonado (D, 1st); Lenny Franciski (D, 2nd); Brenda J. Walker (D, 3rd); Christine Vasquez (D, 4th); Robert Garcia (D, 5th); Gilda Orange (D, 6th)
  - City Clerk: Adrian A. Santos (D)
  - City Judge: Sonya Morris (D)

Area
  - Total: 14.86 sq mi (38.50 km^{2})
  - Land: 14.17 sq mi (36.71 km^{2})
  - Water: 0.69 sq mi (1.78 km^{2})
- Elevation: 587 ft (179 m)

Population (2020)
  - Total: 26,370
  - Density: 1,860.4/sq mi (718.29/km^{2})

Standard of living (2008-12)
  - Per capita income: $13,457
  - Median home value: $86,800
- Time zone: UTC-6 (Central)
  - Summer (DST): UTC-5 (Central)
- ZIP code: 46312
- Area code: 219
- FIPS code: 18-19486
- GNIS feature ID: 2394597
- Waterways: Grand Calumet River; Indiana Harbor and Ship Canal; Lake Michigan
- South Shore Line station: East Chicago
- Public transit: East Chicago Transit
- Website: eastchicago.com

East Chicago is a city in Lake County, Indiana, United States. The population was 26,370 at the 2020 census. Centered around heavy industry, the city is home to the Indiana Harbor and Ship Canal, an artificial freshwater harbor characterized by industrial and manufacturing activity.

Situated along Lake Michigan, East Chicago is about 18 miles (29 km) from downtown Chicago and is just west of Gary, Indiana.

== History ==
=== Founding and early settlement ===
The land that became East Chicago was originally swampland unsuitable for farming. The state of Indiana began selling off plots of land to railroads and speculators after 1851 to fund the local school system. Settlement of the area was very slow at first, and as late as the 1890s, the city had no proper streets or public utilities. East Chicago was incorporated as a city in 1893. The city was named from its location east of Chicago, Illinois.

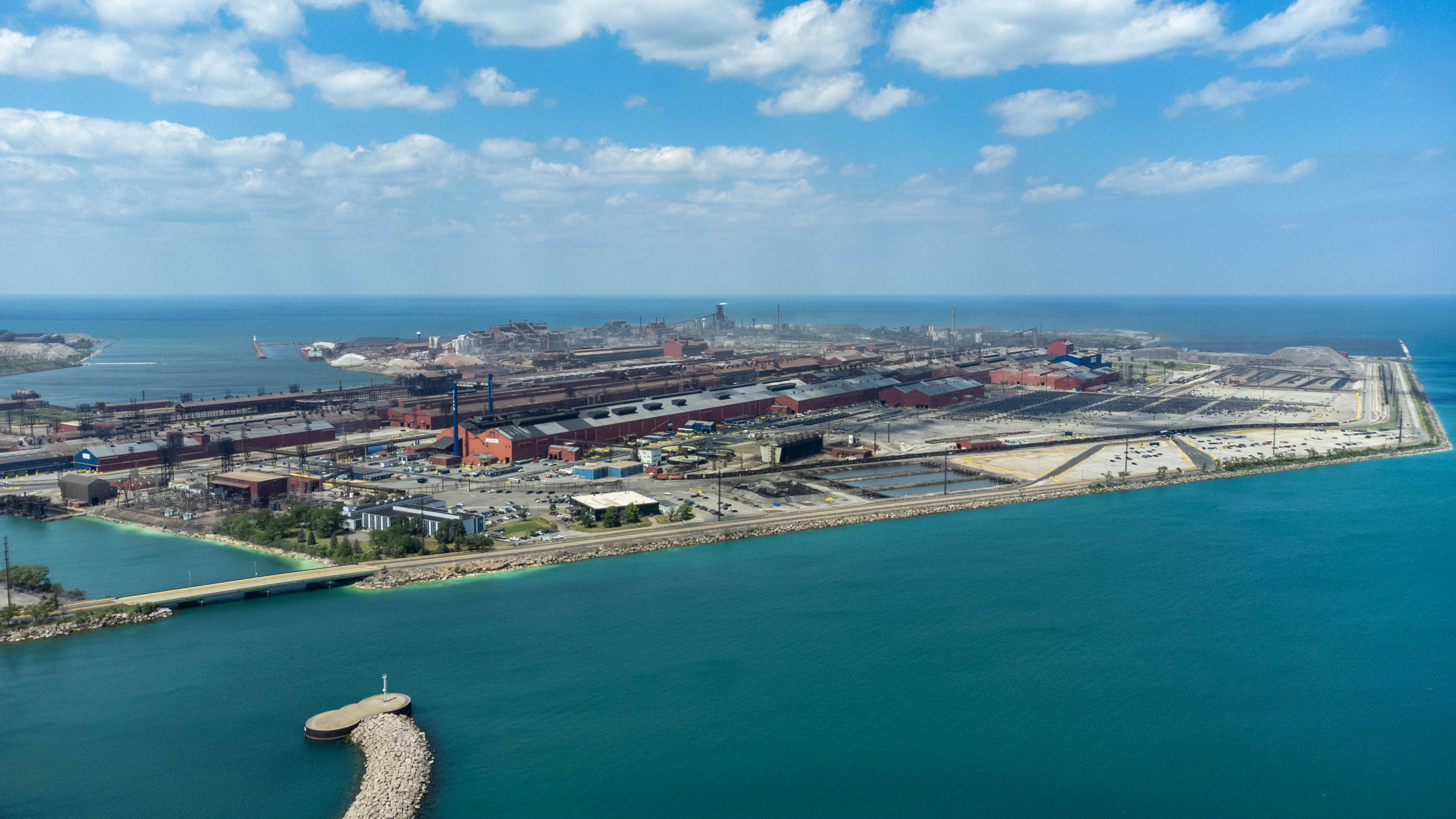
The Indiana Harbor Peninsula

=== Industrial growth ===
The 1900 census gives a total population of just 3,411, but the arrival of Inland Steel in 1903 transformed the city into an industrial powerhouse. The city's population skyrocketed to over 24,000 by 1910, powered by immigration from all over Europe and the United States, and quickly became the most industrialized city in the United States, with over 80% of the city's land zoned for heavy industry. Inland Steel dominated the city's economy through the 1990s, and expanded its massive integrated mill at Indiana Harbor multiple times through the 1980s. From 60,000 tons of steel capacity in 1903, it expanded to 600,000 tons by 1914 and reached 1 million in 1917, and eventually peaked at 8.6 million tons in 1978. By 1907, East Chicago boasted a navigable waterway link to Lake Michigan and to the Grand Calumet River: the Indiana Harbor Ship Canal. Steel mills, petroleum refineries, construction firms, and chemical factories operated at Indiana Harbor and along its inner canal system.

Republic Steel, Youngstown Steel, LaSalle Steel, and U.S. Steel all eventually had steel-making operations in the city. During World War I, East Chicago was nicknamed the "Arsenal of America" (not to be confused with Detroit's label as the "Arsenal of Democracy" during WWII) and the "Workshop of America".

A rivalry developed between Indiana Harbor, the “East Side” home of Inland Steel and most working-class families, and East Chicago's “West Side,” the residential enclave of the native-born business community. Locals spoke of the “Twin City” to describe spatial, residential, and class divisions at the heart of the town's identity. The "Twin City" moniker remains to this day.

=== World War I to the present ===
During the 1910s, several thousand Mexicans immigrated to East Chicago to work in the mills during the labor shortage of 1917–1918 due to U.S. participation in World War I, and also acted as strike breakers during labor unrest in 1919. Most were single men who eventually hoped to return to Mexico, but many stayed on and eventually were joined by their families. The small Mexican community was targeted for voluntary and forced repatriation during the 1930s and 1950s (1,800 were deported in 1932 alone), but those who remained eventually paved the way for later Latino immigration after 1965.

Black Americans also began to arrive in the 1910s and 1920s as part of the first wave of the Great Migration, and this continued from the 1940s to 1960s. According to a city demographic survey in 1959, there were 1,000 Mexican families and 10,000 African American families, along with 3,000 Polish families. There were also a large number of families that identified as Puerto Rican, Romanian, Serbian, Italian, Lithuanian, and Croatian. Over 70 nationalities were represented, with over 59 congregations of the Protestants, Orthodox, Catholic Churches, as well as Jewish synagogues.

Like neighboring Gary, Indiana, East Chicago quickly developed a reputation as a rough industrial city, plagued by extreme pollution, ethnic and racial tensions, organized crime, illegal gambling and clubs, political corruption, prostitution, and other vices. The city continued to rapidly grow in the 1910s and 1920s, and the population peaked in 1960 at 57,669. However, East Chicago's population began to decline in the 1960s as suburbanization, white flight, affordability of automobiles, and the construction of highways meant that workers no longer had to live in the city, but could commute from less-polluted suburbs.

It was the Steel crisis of the 1974-1986 period that completely devastated East Chicago, as it did other industrial cities like Gary, Cleveland, Pittsburgh, and the south side of Chicago. East Chicago's population plunged to 47,000 in 1970, 34,000 by 1990, and 29,000 by 2010. Employment at Inland Steel peaked at 25,000 in 1969, and successive layoffs over the next 30 years were devastating to the community; by 1998, only 9,000 were employed at Inland Steel. Inland Steel was acquired by Ispat International in 1998. Both the Indiana Harbor mill and Youngstown Steel mill were absorbed and merged by ArcelorMittal in 2004 and subsequently sold to Cleveland-Cliffs in 2020.

The Indiana Harbor Public Library and Marktown Historic District are listed in the National Register of Historic Places.

In 2009, parts of East Chicago were discovered to have toxic lead and arsenic contamination, designated the USS Lead Superfund Site. The site is divided into three zones, with public housing and residential properties. Residents' decades-long concerns about lead contamination were confirmed in 2016 via EPA testing, especially affecting over 270 families in the West Calumet Housing Complex. As governor of Indiana, Mike Pence declined to declare the Superfund site a state emergency; his successor Governor Eric Holcomb has issued Executive Order 17-13, declaring a disaster emergency in East Chicago.

== Geography ==
According to the 2010 census, East Chicago has a total area of 16.155 square miles (41.84 km^{2}), of which 14.09 square miles (36.49 km^{2}) (or 87.22%) is land and 2.065 square miles (5.35 km^{2}) (or 12.78%) is water.

== Demographics ==
Historical population
Census	Pop.	Note	%±
1890	1,255		—
1900	3,411		171.8%
1910	19,098		459.9%
1920	35,967		88.3%
1930	54,784		52.3%
1940	54,637		−0.3%
1950	54,263		−0.7%
1960	57,669		6.3%
1970	46,982		−18.5%
1980	39,786		−15.3%
1990	33,892		−14.8%
2000	32,414		−4.4%
2010	29,698		−8.4%
2020	26,370		−11.2%
Source: US Census Bureau

=== Racial and ethnic composition ===
East Chicago city, Indiana – Racial and ethnic composition Note: the US Census treats Hispanic/Latino as an ethnic category. This table excludes Latinos from the racial categories and assigns them to a separate category. Hispanics/Latinos may be of any race.
Race / Ethnicity (NH = Non-Hispanic)	Pop 2000	Pop 2010	Pop 2020	% 2000	% 2010	% 2020
White alone (NH)	3,922	2,140	1,600	12.10%	7.21%	6.07%
Black or African American alone (NH)	11,405	12,125	10,375	35.19%	40.83%	39.34%
Native American or Alaska Native alone (NH)	66	46	39	0.20%	0.15%	0.15%
Asian alone (NH)	52	28	57	0.16%	0.09%	0.22%
Native Hawaiian or Pacific Islander alone (NH)	8	4	7	0.02%	0.01%	0.03%
Other race alone (NH)	27	23	73	0.08%	0.08%	0.28%
Mixed race or Multiracial (NH)	206	227	355	0.64%	0.76%	1.35%
Hispanic or Latino (any race)	16,728	15,105	13,864	51.61%	50.86%	52.57%
Total	32,414	29,698	26,370	100.00%	100.00%	100.00%

=== 2020 census ===
As of the 2020 census, East Chicago had a population of 26,370. The median age was 33.1 years. 28.9% of residents were under the age of 18 and 13.0% of residents were 65 years of age or older. For every 100 females there were 89.4 males, and for every 100 females age 18 and over there were 82.9 males age 18 and over.

100.0% of residents lived in urban areas, while 0.0% lived in rural areas.

There were 9,859 households in East Chicago, of which 37.1% had children under the age of 18 living in them. Of all households, 25.4% were married-couple households, 23.4% were households with a male householder and no spouse or partner present, and 43.3% were households with a female householder and no spouse or partner present. About 30.9% of all households were made up of individuals and 10.2% had someone living alone who was 65 years of age or older.

There were 11,735 housing units, of which 16.0% were vacant. The homeowner vacancy rate was 1.5% and the rental vacancy rate was 8.3%.

Racial composition as of the 2020 census
Race	Number	Percent
White	4,342	16.5%
Black or African American	10,839	41.1%
American Indian and Alaska Native	297	1.1%
Asian	75	0.3%
Native Hawaiian and Other Pacific Islander	17	0.1%
Some other race	6,922	26.2%
Two or more races	3,878	14.7%
Hispanic or Latino (of any race)	13,864	52.6%

=== 2010 census ===
As of the census of 2010, there were 29,698 people, 10,724 households, and 7,197 families residing in the city. The population density was 2,107.7 inhabitants per square mile (813.8/km^{2}). There were 12,958 housing units at an average density of 919.7 per square mile (355.1/km^{2}). The racial makeup of the city was 42.9% African American, 35.5% White, 0.6% Native American, 0.1% Asian, 18.1% from other races, and 2.8% from two or more races. Hispanic or Latino of any race were 50.9% of the population.

There were 10,724 households, of which 40.8% had children under the age of 18 living with them, 27.9% were married couples living together, 31.4% had a female householder with no husband present, 7.7% had a male householder with no wife present, and 32.9% were non-families. 29.0% of all households were made up of individuals, and 9.5% had someone living alone who was 65 years of age or older. The average household size was 2.75 and the average family size was 3.42.

The median age in the city was 30.9 years. 31.4% of residents were under the age of 18; 9.7% were between the ages of 18 and 24; 25.4% were from 25 to 44; 22.2% were from 45 to 64; and 11.3% were 65 years of age or older. The gender makeup of the city was 46.8% male and 53.2% female.

=== 2000 census ===
As of the census of 2000, there were 32,414 people, 11,707 households, and 7,937 families residing in the city. The population density was 2,706.3 inhabitants per square mile (1,044.9/km^{2}). There were 13,261 housing units at an average density of 1,107.2 per square mile (427.5/km^{2}). The racial makeup of the city was 36.54% White, 36.08% African American, 0.51% Native American, 0.20% Asian, 0.08% Pacific Islander, 23.98% from other races, and 2.60% from two or more races. Hispanic or Latino of any race were 51.61% of the population. Whites who are not Hispanic or Latino were 12.10% of the city's population. 54.3% spoke only English at home, while 42.9% spoke Spanish and 1.2% Polish at home.

There were 11,707 households, out of which 35.6% had children under the age of 18 living with them, 34.8% were married couples living together, 26.7% had a female householder with no husband present, and 32.2% were non-families. 28.6% of all households were made up of individuals, and 11.2% had someone living alone who was 65 years of age or older. The average household size was 2.75 and the average family size was 3.41.

In the city, the population was spread out, with 30.5% under the age of 18, 11.1% from 18 to 24, 26.8% from 25 to 44, 18.3% from 45 to 64, and 13.3% who were 65 years of age or older. The median age was 31 years. For every 100 females, there were 91.7 males. For every 100 females age 18 and over, there were 86.1 males.

The median income for a household in the city was $26,538, and the median income for a family was $31,778. Males had a median income of $32,588 versus $21,678 for females. The per capita income for the city was $13,517. About 22.5% of families and 24.4% of the population were below the poverty line, including 33.3% of those under age 18 and 15.6% of those age 65 or over.

== Transportation ==
The nearest commercial airport to East Chicago is the Gary/Chicago International Airport in neighboring Gary, but it does not have any scheduled passenger service. The closest commercial airport with scheduled passenger service is Chicago Midway Airport.

The South Shore Line has a station in East Chicago. The Wolverine at Hammond-Whiting station, 5.5 miles to the northwest, is the nearest Amtrak service.

US 12 and US 20 go through the Indiana Harbor and East Chicago sections of the city, respectively, before joining up on both sides. Indiana State Road 912, the Cline Avenue Expressway, connects East Chicago with the Indiana Toll Road and Borman Expressway, and serves the casino and steel mills on the lakefront.

=== Bus transit ===
The city operates a free bus service known as East Chicago Transit. It features three routes: Crosstown, West Calumet, and Griffith Plaza. GPRT Route R1 stops in East Chicago en route from Hammond to Gary. PACE operates Route 892, a special work shuttle between Gary, East Chicago and UPS's Hodgkins facility. Its schedule coincides with UPS workers' shifts. The route is operated in cooperation with UPS, which partially funds its operations.

== Neighborhoods ==
- Indiana Harbor (East Chicago)
  - North Harbor
  - Sunnyside
  - New Addition
  - Washington Park
  - Prairie Park
  - Marktown
- East Chicago
  - Northside
  - Southside
  - Roxana
  - Calumet

== Education ==
- School City of East Chicago serves all of the city. All residents are zoned to Central High School.
- Ivy Tech Community College of Indiana

East Chicago Public Library System operates a main library at 2401 East Columbus Drive and the Robert A. Pastrick Branch Library at 1008 West Chicago Avenue at Baring Avenue. East Chicago also has two charter school options, East Chicago Urban Enterprise (K-8), and East Chicago Lighthouse Charter School (K-7).

== Industry ==
East Chicago is home to the following business and industry:

- Cleveland-Cliffs' Indiana Harbor Works, the largest steel mill in the USA. Indiana Harbor Works comprises East mill, originally Inland Steel, and West mill, owned for most of its life by Youngstown Sheet and Tube, both acquired and merged by ArcelorMittal.
- U.S. Steel’s East Chicago Tin, a steel finishing faculty part of Gary Works.
- The Indiana Harbor and Ship Canal complex.

For 105 years, East Chicago was home to the Inland Steel Company (1893–1998).

The Showboat Casino opened in 1997 with about 900 employees. Other large employers include Amoco Oil Co., Union Tank Car, American Steel Foundries, USG Corp. and St. Catherine Hospital.

== Notable people ==
Government

- Gonzalo P. Curiel - US District Court judge
- Earl Harris - Indiana state legislator
- William C. Kavanaugh - Wisconsin State Assemblyman
- Vincent Mroz - Secret Service agent
- Lonnie Randolph - Member of Indiana Senate
- Jerome Reppa - Indiana lawyer and politician
- Theodore L. Sendak - 36th Indiana Attorney General
- Richard Williams - diplomat, author, first US ambassador to Mongolia

Military

- Emilio A. De La Garza, Jr. - U.S. Marine Corps, Medal of Honor recipient, Vietnam War
- Alexander Vraciu - U.S. Navy, Navy Cross, leading flying ace during World War II

Movies - TV

- Leslie Edgley - novelist, playwright, radio dramatist and screenwriter
- John Hubbard - actor
- Betsy Palmer - actress and television personality
- Frank Reynolds - ABC television news anchorman
- Steve Tesich - Academy Award-winning screenwriter

Music

- Yungeen Ace - rapper
- Catfish Keith - blues singer, songwriter and slide guitarist
- Mighty Mo Rodgers - blues musician, songwriter and record producer

Sports

- Bob Anderson - Major League Baseball player
- Jim Bradley - professional basketball player
- Junior Bridgeman - NBA player for Milwaukee Bucks and businessman; jersey number retired by Bucks
- Larry Fritz - Major League Baseball player
- Jim Hicks - Major League Baseball player
- Danny Lazar - Major League Baseball pitcher
- Kenny Lofton - Major League Baseball player, 6-time All-Star, 4-time Gold Glove winner
- Angel Manfredy - professional boxer/title holder
- Monica Maxwell - professional basketball player
- E'Twaun Moore - professional basketball player
- Ilie Oană - football player and manager who represented and coached Romania national football team
- Frank Patrick - professional football player
- Stan Perzanowski - MLB pitcher
- Bridget Pettis - professional basketball player and coach
- Gregg Popovich - coach of San Antonio Spurs, 5-time NBA champion, 3-time NBA Coach of the Year
- Jason Repko - Major League Baseball outfielder for Boston Red Sox and Los Angeles Dodgers
- Kawann Short - Carolina Panthers professional football player
- Matt Smith - sports radio personality
- Ron Smith - NFL player
- Tim Stoddard - Major League Baseball pitcher and college basketball player, forward for NC State's 1974 NCAA basketball champions, and relief pitcher for the 1983 World Series Champion Baltimore Orioles
- Pete Trgovich—played on 1971 Washington HS Indiana state championship team with Junior Bridgeman and Tim Stoddard, went on to play for legendary coach John Wooden at UCLA, winning 3 NCAA Championship rings
- Ray Wietecha - assistant coach to Vince Lombardi and NFL champion Green Bay Packers

Other

- Eric Flint - Speculative Fiction Author
- Andrew Majda - Mathematician
- Cliff Raven - tattoo artist
- David Albin Zywiec Sidor - American-Nicaraguan Roman Catholic bishop
- Miguel Torres - mixed martial artist
- Warren W. Wiersbe - theologian
