= Inland Steel Company =

American steel company (1893–1998)

Coordinates: 41°39′16″N 87°26′49″W

- Industry: Steel Production
- Predecessor: Chicago Steel Works
- Founded: 1893; 133 years ago
- Defunct: 1998; 28 years ago
- Fate: Acquired by Ispat International
- Successor: Cleveland-Cliffs (2020–present); ArcelorMittal (2006–2020); Mittal Steel Company (2004–2006); Ispat-Inland (1998–2004)
- Headquarters: Chicago, Illinois, United States

The Inland Steel Company was an American steel company active from 1893 until its acquisition in 1998 by Ispat International (later Mittal Steel Company). Originally based in East Chicago, Indiana, it was eventually headquartered in Chicago at the landmark Inland Steel Building.

The company began with the founders' purchase of the land and machinery associated with a failed steel mill in 1893. Inland Steel initially expanded through the efforts of steel industry investors and the family of founder Joseph Block. Inland opened a second steel plant during World War I, and the company continued to grow, making purchases of other companies starting in 1928 to facilitate vertical integration. Demand for consumer products made from steel rose in the 1950s, and the main Inland Steel mill in Indiana Harbor hit its peak employment level in 1969. From then on, the company repeatedly faced reduced demand, economic downturns, and failed business ventures. Over the next few decades, the company shrank and became unprofitable. It was sold to Ispat International, a Dutch firm, in 1998. Starting in 2020, its assets were owned by Cleveland-Cliffs.

Inland Steel was an integrated steel company that reduced iron ore to steel. It specialized in the basic open hearth steelmaking process. This produced a steel that was resistant to extreme temperature, unlike those made from the Bessemer or acid open hearth processes. Its primary mill, built in 1901, was situated on a large landfill protruding out into Lake Michigan next to the Indiana Harbor and Ship Canal. The steel mill's shoreline location enabled it to take in steelmaking commodities, such as iron ore, coal, and limestone, by lake freighter. Throughout much of its existence, Inland Steel operated its own fleet of bulk carrier vessels.

The company's union, Steel Workers Organizing Committee Local 1010, was established in 1936. Viewed as the most left-leaning of all steelworkers' locals, Local 1010 focused on improving workplace conditions and bargaining for benefits and wage increases for employees. On the occasions that negotiations failed, Local 1010 organized repeated labor strikes.

== Firm history ==
=== Startup ===
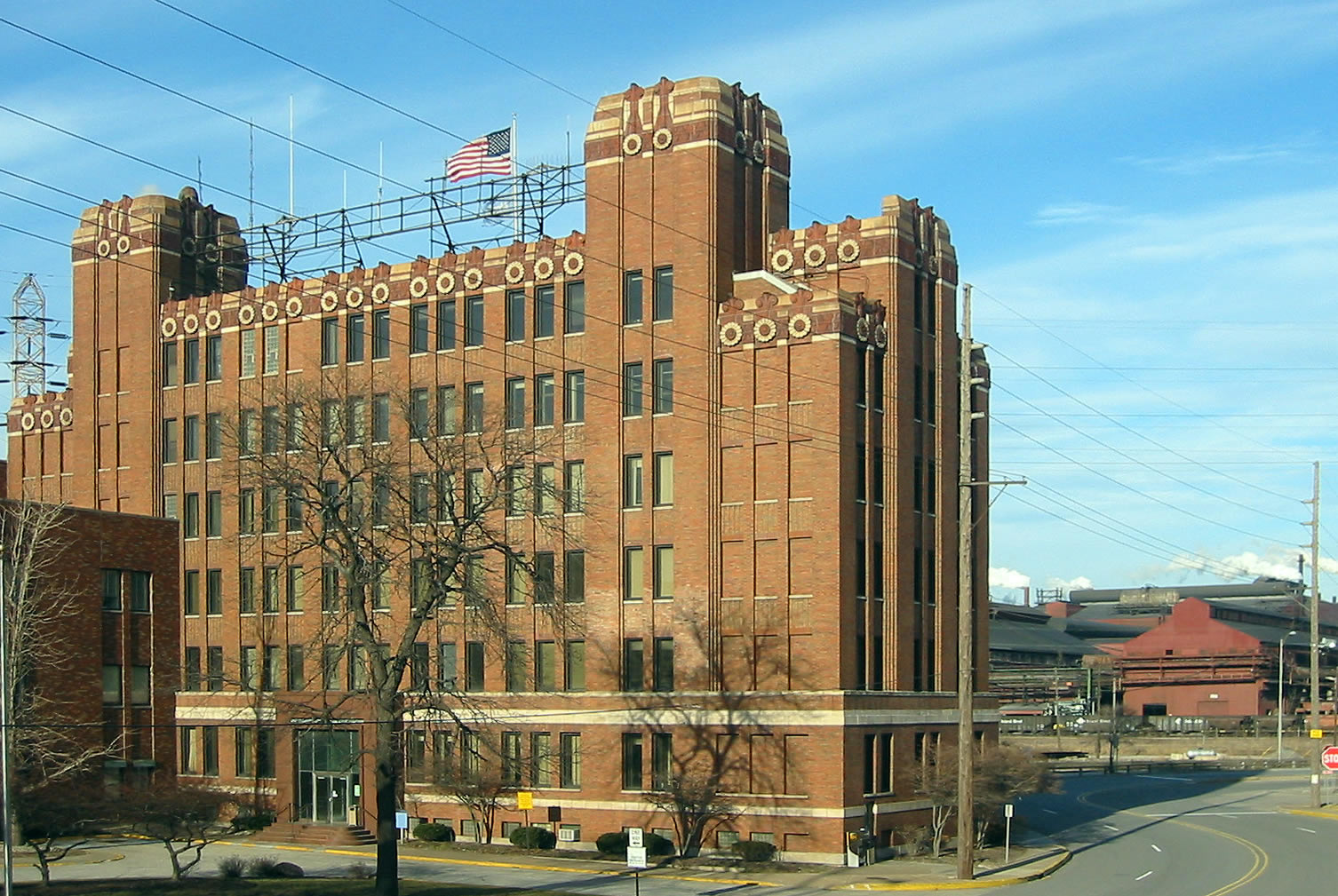
Inland Steel's main office building in East Chicago, Indiana, completed in 1930, was designed by Graham, Anderson, Probst & White

Inland Steel was founded in 1893 through the purchase of a small failed Chicago Heights steel mill, Chicago Steel Works. After its closing, the machinery was bought by Ross Buckingham. He was able to acquire six acres of land and $20,000 for buildings, but was unable to raise more capital. An acquaintance of Buckingham, George H. Jones, learned of this and became interested. At the World's Columbian Exposition in 1893, Jones met Joseph Block of the Block-Pollack Iron Company. Block wanted to be involved in this new business venture, but his business associates did not. Block put up the capital himself and brought in his 22-year-old son, Philip D. Block. After purchasing Buckingham's land and machinery, Inland Steel Company was officially in business on 30 October 1893.

Inland Steel was immediately successful, making a small profit in 1894. A slightly larger profit was earned in 1895. A disagreement broke out between the founders on what should be done with these profits. William H. Adams and some other investors wanted a larger return on their investment, while others wanted to reinvest profits back into the company. Reinvestment would allow them to replace the old machinery that was in constant need of repair. It was decided that they would reinvest the profits, causing Adams to leave the company. He sold his shares to L.E. Block, oldest son of Joseph. The Block family led Inland Steel through its early years.

In 1901, the company raised more than $1 million to build an open-hearth mill in East Chicago. This would become the firm's primary location, the Indiana Harbor plant. This expansion allowed the firm to grow more than tenfold in size, from 250 workers in 1897 to 2,600 in 1910. R.J. Beatty of Midland Steel invested and became general manager, bringing the addition of sheet mills. In March 1903, G.H. Jones was named president. Shareholders voted to increase stock from $2,000,000 to $2,500,000. Inland began to secure their own primary materials with the lease of land in Minnesota's Laura Iron Mine from 1906. The following year marked the debut of the Madeline No. 1 furnace. Named after the daughter of Philip D Block, it was the first blast furnace in northern Indiana. On 6 December 1914, founder Joseph Block died.

=== Growth ===
In 1917, during World War I, Inland Steel's production broke the 1.0-million ton (0.9m tonne) mark for the first time. A second plant opened that year. The new plant was run completely by electricity. The plan for electrification had been developed by a Westinghouse engineer named Wilfred Sykes, who later joined the company in 1922. Philip D. Block became president in 1919, taking over for Alexis W. Thompson, who had held the position since 1908. He devised a plan for a workday consisting of three 8-hour shifts, but the company decided that the plan could not be used until the other steel firms adopted a similar one. In 1928, Inland purchased White Marble Lime Company, renaming it Inland Lime and Stone Company. Port Inland in Michigan was built around these limestone and dolomite quarries. In 1930, the firm completed a new office headquarters in East Chicago, which still survives.

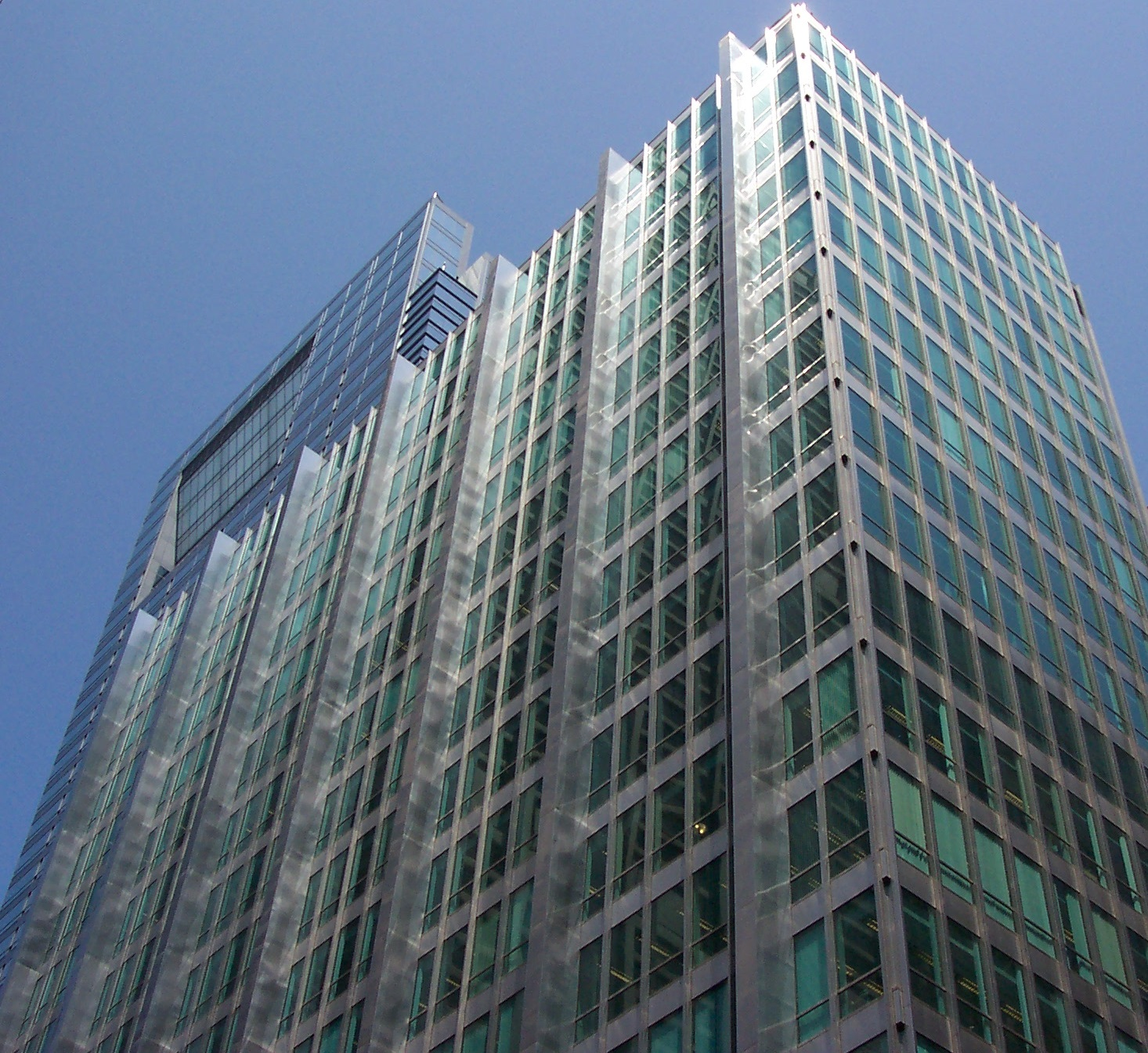
The Inland Steel Building was designed by Skidmore, Owings & Merrill and opened on February 3, 1958.

In 1935, Inland acquired the steel warehouse business of Joseph T Ryerson & Sons, Inc. Edward L Ryerson became vice chairman of the board at Inland. Milcor Steel Company of Milwaukee was purchased in 1936. In that same year, Inland acquired Wilson & Bennett Manufacturing. The latter became Inland Container Company, which brought the addition of pails, barrels, and food containers to their list of products. By World War II, the Chicago-area steelmaker had 14,000 employees and was producing 3.4 million tons (3.0m tonnes) per year. Inland received two awards for military production in 1943. The Army/Navy "E" of achievement was given for high production of wartime material. The "M" from the U.S. Maritime Administration was for outstanding achievement in vital wartime contracts. Inland Steel became fully vertically integrated in 1944. Philip D. Block retired his presidency the following year and was replaced by L.E. Block. In 1948, Wilfred Sykes became president.

Starting in the 1950s, there was an increased demand for consumer products made from steel, such as appliances and motor vehicles. Cold rolling processes were used to make the sheets and strips necessary in the manufacture of these goods, and Inland soon specialized in this process. A $360 million project was undertaken to modernize existing facilities, acquire more resources, and erect new buildings. Clarence B. Randall was named president of Inland in 1952. A Canadian subsidiary, Caland Ore Company, was founded in 1953. In 1956–1957, the firm constructed a new corporate headquarters, the Inland Steel Building, in downtown Chicago. Joseph L. Block was named as company president in 1959. The 1960s began profitably for the steel industry. A large project to expand and upgrade facilities began in 1962 and was completed in 1966. The following year, a new research lab was opened in East Chicago and Philip D. Block Jr. took over the leadership of Inland from cousin Joseph L. Block. Employment at the Indiana Harbor mill rose toward its peak of 25,000 in 1969.

=== Decline and acquisition ===
In the early 1970s, the steel industry saw a sharp decline in business. Inland began to invest in the housing market through subsidiary Inland Steel Urban Development Corporation. Foreign steel companies were increasing their presence in the world steel market. In 1971, the role of President of Inland Steel passed to Michael Tenenbaum, who further coordinated the technical aspects of the company and wrote extensively on air pollution and energy conservation. The business became profitable again in 1974, but a recession the following year ended the temporary steel boom. The market for domestic steel remained in a downturn until 1978.

The 1980s began with another downturn for Inland and other companies in the domestic steel industry. Foreign companies offered lower prices that U.S. companies could not match. Between 1982 and 1985, Inland lost $456 million. During this time, the company began to sell off many of its subsidiaries, including raw materials and transportation services. Inland was no longer fully vertically integrated. Operations at the Indiana Harbor steel mill were reduced to running at 70 percent of steelmaking capacity.

Inland Steel entered into two joint venture partnerships with Nippon Steel to create the I/N Tek cold rolling mill and the I/N Kote steel sheet galvanizing facility. This strategic partnership gave the company access to Japanese automakers based in the U.S., but profitability continued to be difficult to attain. Although Inland was still the largest steel distributor and fourth largest manufacturer in the United States, the company did not have a profitable year in the 1990s until 1994. The following year, the company formed Inland International to sell and distribute products to companies in Mexico, China, Hong Kong, South Africa, and India. To appease major shareholders, the company made the decision to retain steel distributor Ryerson-Tull and sell its steel production facilities.

In July 1998, Ispat International (later Mittal Steel Company) acquired Inland Steel for $1.4 billion. Mittal Steel Company acquired Arcelor to form ArcelorMittal in 2006. In 2020, it sold its U.S. assets, including the former Inland Steel assets, to Cleveland-Cliffs.

== Facilities ==
=== Open-hearth steel ===
In 1894, Inland established its first research lab. By 1935, the lab employed 35 researchers. The lab was located in the open hearth department of the plant, allowing steel to be tested as it was being made. It would be tested for impurities, chemical composition, and physical properties. Researchers also worked on the development of new steel types.

The company purchased fifty acres of land along Lake Michigan in 1901 for the development of a plant with an open hearth furnace, a type of furnace that has scrap and pig iron thrown in and heated to a very high temperature. In August of the following year, the plant at Indiana Harbor was put into operation. It had four 40-ton open hearth furnaces, a 32' blooming mill, 7 sheet and bar mills, and a 24" universal bar mill. Company headquarters were in the Marquette Building in Chicago.

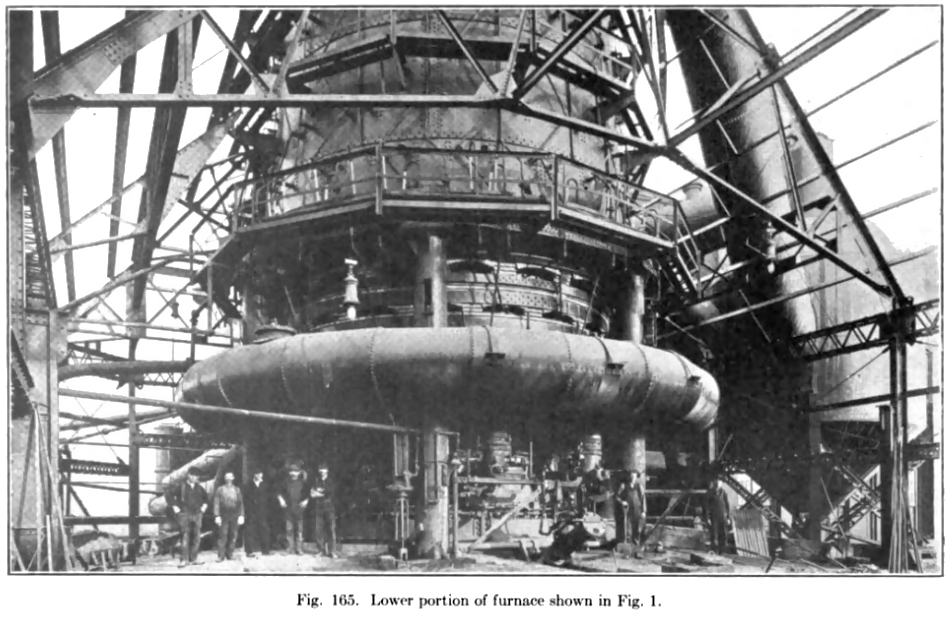
Early 20th century Madeline blast furnace

In August 1906, a new 50-acre tract with 4000 feet of water frontage was acquired next to the existing plant. Also acquired was the Laura ore mine on the Mesabi range. The company's fifth open hearth furnace had just been completed, and the daily production capacity of open hearth steel was 500 tons. The "Madeline" blast furnace, with a rated capacity of 350 tons/day, was blown in on 31 August 1907. A blast furnace heats iron ore, limestone, and coke to a temperature of at least 3000 degrees Fahrenheit. Impurities in the molten metal rise to the top and are removed when hot air is blown in.

=== Sheet steel ===
In 1908, the firm continued to expand its facilities. The plant at Indiana Harbor got 3 new sheet mills, 2 galvanizing pots, an 8"-11" merchant mill, and a 24" sheet bar billet and mill. Two open hearth furnaces and 8 sheet mills were added in 1910. Land was leased on the Cuyuna Range in Minnesota for iron ore mining. With capital stock increased from $2,500,000 to $5,000,000, further additions were made that brought the total of furnaces owned to 2 modern blast furnaces and 6 open hearth furnaces. In 1911 in Plant 1 the bolt and rivet shop started operation, and the Inland Steamship Company was formed. On 4 April 1912, the Madeline No. 2 furnace was installed. She was placed 366 feet north of, and was slightly larger than, No. 1.

In 1916, No. 2 Open Hearth started in Plant 2 with six furnaces along with a 32" roughing mill. The completely electrified Indiana Harbor plant #2 was completed in 1917. On January 16, 44 Koppers coke ovens commenced production, bringing the company's total to 130 ovens, with a Koppers by-product and benzol recovery plant. On April 24, blast furnace Madeline No. 3, with a rated capacity of 500-600 tons/day, was blown in. Ten open hearth furnaces, 20 soaking pits, a 40" blooming mill, and new docks were also installed in the second plant.

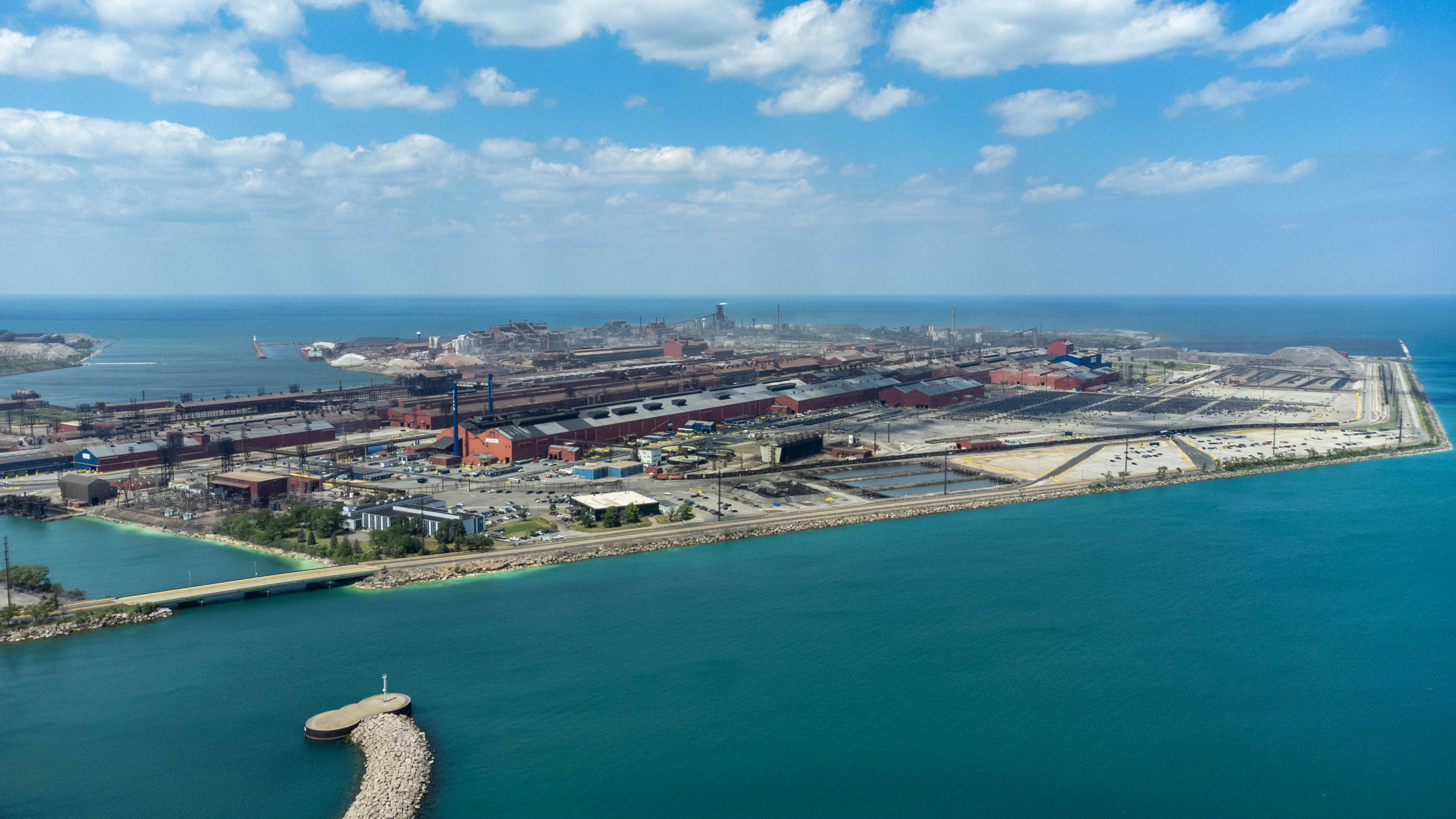
Indiana Harbor Works in East Chicago, Indiana, can be seen on the peninsula that extends into Lake Michigan

In 1928, Inland purchased limestone and dolomite quarries in Michigan's Upper Peninsula. This became Inland Lime & Stone Company. A new harbor and docks were built and given the name of Port Inland. A new stone-crushing and ship-loading plant was completed in 1930. Inland also secured its own source of coal, a small mining operation at Greenwood Mine, near Marquette, Michigan. A much larger source was secured when land and equipment was purchased from Elkhorn Coal Company. Inland was responsible for introducing a water supply, sanitation, and paved roads into the mine's nearby town of Wheelwright, Kentucky.

In 1932 a 76" hot strip mill was added, a tin mill in 1933, and in 1938, a 2.5 minutes per mile 44" hot strip mill, 59 coke ovens, and 5 open hearth furnaces were put in at Indiana Harbor. On 3 January 1939, Madeline No. 5, the newest and largest among Inland's furnaces, was blown in, with a capacity of 1000 tons/day, for a new company-wide total of 4000 tons/day. This blast furnace was built by Arthur G. McKee & Co, who had also built No. 1 in 1907. Madeline No. 6 arrived in 1942.

Inland formed a Canadian subsidiary in 1953, the Caland Ore Company, when the company signed a contract to lease a high-grade iron ore deposit under Steep Rock Lake in Ontario. A large expenditure project modernized existing facilities and commissioned a new corporate headquarters building, which was completed in 1957. In 1959, Inland gained additional sources of iron ore when the company invested in The Wabash Iron Company of Canada's Labrador region.

=== Basic oxygen steelmaking ===
A new expansion program was started in 1962 with the construction of a new 80-inch continuous hot strip mill. Inland also got its first oxygen-steelmaking shop. The first open-hearth shop, which had been in operation for 60 years, was closed. A new research facility in East Chicago was completed in 1967.

In 1980, Madeline No. 7, at the time the largest blast furnace in the Western Hemisphere, was brought online along with the No. 11 coke battery built 2 years prior. In that same year, the Caland Ore Company shipped its final taconite pellets to Indiana Harbor. With the exception of its other iron ore sources, Inland sold all of its interests in raw materials. In 1986, the company acquired J.M. Tull Metals Company, a manufacturer and distributor of metal products. In partnership with Nippon Steel, the I/N Tek continuous cold rolling mill was built in New Carlisle, Indiana the following year. In 1988, the parties entered into a second joint venture with the construction of the I/N Kote steel sheet galvanizing facility at the same site.

== Employee programs and benefits ==
The Inland Department of Safety, Sanitation, and Relief implemented a program for workplace safety in 1911. It was credited for reducing time off work due to accidents by one-third. In that same year, the Inland Fellowship Club was formed. Seventy percent of Indiana Harbor employees contributed 10 cents per month to a fund for worker relief. Inland used its own supply of coal to provide donations for workers in need. During the Great Depression, despite their own reduced income, many workers contributed 3% of their salary to the Fellowship Club. The contributions were matched by the company. Funded by vending machine profits at Indiana Harbor Works, Inland Athletic Association was formed in 1934. Employees participated in team and individual competitive sports such as bowling, horseshoes, golf, baseball, softball, volleyball, basketball, and tennis. In 1936, a medical clinic was set up at Indiana Harbor to serve workers and their families.

Contributory group insurance was offered to employees beginning in 1930, with life insurance policies being the first. A pension plan was implemented in 1936. Sickness, accident, and hospitalization insurances were added in 1940. Death and dismemberment insurance was included in 1942. In 1960, all insurance benefits became noncontributory. An early retirement plan, based on age and length of employment, was put into effect in 1966. Beginning in 1970, employees received a major medical insurance plan. Dental benefits were added one year later. Vision was included in 1979.

== Local 1010 ==
Inland's union, Local 1010, was viewed as the most left-leaning and radical of the steelworkers' unions, earning it the nickname of the "red local". A high frequency of wildcat strikes caused the local to gain a reputation as being militant. In 1936, Steel Workers Organizing Committee (SWOC) 1010 was formed by eight members of the Amalgamated Association of Iron, Steel, & Tin Workers. Among these original eight members was a man named William Young. He would later become the first black person to sit at the negotiation table with Inland and the first in the U.S. to serve as chairman of a basic grievance committee of a steelworkers' union.

In 1937, "big steel" company U.S. Steel signed a collective bargaining contract. SWOC called for a nationwide strike on the "little steel" companies of Republic, Youngstown, Bethlehem, and Inland due to their refusals to sign contracts and allow collective bargaining. On 26 May, the strike shut down operations at Indiana Harbor. Inland workers were allowed to strike without police intervention. On 30 May, a large number of members from Local 1010 arrived in South Chicago to support the striking workers at Republic Steel. In what became known as the "Memorial Day Massacre", Chicago police opened fire on striking workers and their supporters. Ten men were killed and 125 more were injured. Among the dead were four Inland employees: Alfred Causey, Kenneth Reed, Earl Handley, and Sam Popovich. On 1 July, the strike at Indiana Harbor was ended through the intervention of state governor M. Clifford Townsend. He had each party sign an agreement with him, then promised to resolve any grievances that could not be resolved at the plant. Inland approved of the wage increases and signed the governor's agreement. However, the company still refused to acknowledge the union.

Despite this, the union continued to meet. The majority of their demands focused on ending discrimination based on age, race, and gender. They wanted equal pay for equal work and a system of job promotion that was based on seniority. In 1942, SWOC officially became the United Steelworkers Association (USWA). In the same year, the National War Labor Board ordered the "little steel" companies to allow unionization. Inland became the first to comply with this order on 3 August, when they signed a contract with the United Steelworkers of America. Strikes in both 1946 and 1947 resulted in a total wage increase of 34 cents per hour. A monthlong strike in 1949 helped workers gain another wage increase and pension plan.

In the following decade, the union and Inland became hopelessly deadlocked on three separate occasions. The 1952 steel strike led to a monthlong strike that only ended when steel manufacturers agreed to terms recommended by the Wage Stabilization Board, which they had initially refused. A three-year contract signed in 1956 provided annual wage increases and paid holidays, but contained a no-strike clause. This was also the year that Local 1010 joined the Coordinated Committee of Steel Companies (CCSC) for industrywide bargaining in wages and benefits. When the contract expired in 1959, the company and the union were once again at odds. Striking workers demanded a wage increase, along with better insurance and pensions. After 116 days, the company relented and met those demands. This strike was the union's longest and its last against Inland Steel or any of its predecessors. Local 1010 continued to serve as the labor union at the former Inland Steel Company's facilities, though it has bargained independently of other unions ever since the CCSC dissolved in 1985.

== Inland fleet ==
In 1911, the Inland Steamship Company was formed, with Hutchinson & Company of Cleveland serving as purchasing agent and manager of marine operations. Two steamships were purchased from the Acme Transit Company, the Hawgood and the Woodford.

=== SS Joseph Block ===
The Arthur H. Hawgood, at 569 feet, was renamed Joseph Block. During her years of service, the Joseph Block was involved in numerous incidents. In 1913, she needed to be placed in the drydock for repairs after striking a pier at the Canadian lock in Sault Ste. Marie. Two months later, she ran aground and was struck by steamer Calcite of the Bradley fleet. In May 1916, the crew of the Joseph Block rescued one of two survivors from the shipwreck of the S R Kirby. In 1917, she received damage after hitting an ice pack in Lake Superior. A 1919 November gale led to another trip to the shipyard.

The Joseph Block grounded at the Death's Door Passage near Green Bay in 1968. Deciding against repairing the extensive damages, the company sold her to Kinsman Marine Transport. She was repaired and entered their service as the George Steinbrenner.

=== SS N. F. Leopold ===
The second boat purchased from Hawsgood was the W. R. Woodford, which was a little shorter at 552 feet. She was renamed N. F. Leopold. Like the Joseph Block, the N. F. Leopold was involved in several mishaps. In 1915, she grounded near Port Calcite. Two years later, an ice pack caused damage to her hull. In a 1924 collision with the Charles L. Hutchinson, both ships received minor damage, Two separate groundings in 1928 necessitated the replacement of parts in Escanaba, Michigan. In 1943 Inland renamed the ship E.J. Block. In 1947 the ship was sent to American Ship Building Company in Lorain, Ohio to receive an extensive retrofit which included replacing her original triple-expansion steam engine with two GE/Westinghouse 1,424 horsepower diesel engines driving a single DC propulsion motor.The second grounding occurred 40 years later in the St. Mary's River. In 1979, she collided with tug George N. Carleton in Thunder Bay. Both escaped relatively unharmed, without the need for any major repairs.

E.J. Block was laid up in 1981. In 1986, she was purchased by Basic Marine, Inc. The following year, she was towed to Lake Calumet in South Chicago to be used for cement storage. She sank from being overloaded. In 1988, E.J. Block was towed back to Escanaba. She remained there until she was towed to the Port Colborne scrap yard in 2006.

=== SS Philip D. Block ===
Steamship Philip D. Block, also built at the American Ship Building Company of Lorain, entered service in 1925. First owned by the Pioneer Steamship Company, she was acquired by Inland in 1936. Built at the length of 600 feet, 72 more were added to her midsection in 1950. Additional work modernized her navigational equipment, engines, and accommodations. In 1955, she was struck by the departing G. A. Tomlinson while docked in Indiana Harbor. G. A. Tomlinson suffered damages to her hull, while Philip D. Block only needed cosmetic repairs.

She remained in service until she was laid up in 1981. In 1985, she was sold to the scrap yard in Port Colborne. The navigational equipment was removed, and the Philip D. Block was sold to be scrapped in Brazil in 1986. Along with the W. W. Holloway (formerly the SS Henry A. Hawgood), she was taken under tow by the Jantar. After a journey of about six weeks, they arrived in Recife and were scrapped.

=== MV Steel Chemist ===
In 1946, Inland purchased the motor vessel Steel Chemist from U.S. Steel, which they renamed The Inland. With two cranes mounted on the deck a length of 258 feet, she was capable of delivering steel products to most ports along the Great Lakes. The Inland only served in the fleet for two years, which were without incident. She was sold to Transit Tankers & Terminals, of Quebec, where she was converted to a liquid bulk carrier and rechristened as Transinland. During an extended period of being laid-up, vandals caused serious damage to the ship's internal structure. She was scrapped in 1980.

=== SS Wilfred Sykes ===
The first U.S. ship built on the Great Lakes after World War II was the SS Wilfred Sykes. Named after the president of the company at that time, the 678 foot long vessel entered service in 1950. She was designed to operate with greater speed and carrying capacity, and was considered the prototype for all future lake freighters.

In her two years as the largest ship on the lakes, Wilfred Sykes set five records for hauling the most tonnage of iron ore. She had incidents of grounding in 1973, 1998, and 2002. In 1997, she hit a seawall near Grand Haven, Michigan. Except for the 1973 grounding that required a trip to drydock for repairs, Wilfred Sykes escaped these incidents with only superficial damage. A boiler explosion in 1984 caused massive damage to the mechanical systems.

In 1953, Wilfred Sykes responded to the distress call of the SS Henry Steinbrenner. First mate Arthur Ritter and nine other crew entered frigid Lake Superior in one of the ship's lifeboats to look for survivors. They rescued two men. When the crew arrived at Indiana Harbor, each crew member was given a U.S. savings bond. The Lake Carriers Association later presented them with a citation of bravery on a bronze plaque. In 1971, the crew rescued a man whose sailboat had gone adrift on Lake Michigan. The Wilfred Sykes was one of several ships that joined the unsuccessful rescue efforts in the 1975 sinking of the SS Edmund Fitzgerald.

After the 1998 sale of Inland Steel, Wilfred Sykes came under the ownership of the Indiana Harbor Steamship Company and the management of Central Marine Logistics. The ship was still in service as of 2025.

=== SS Edward L. Ryerson ===
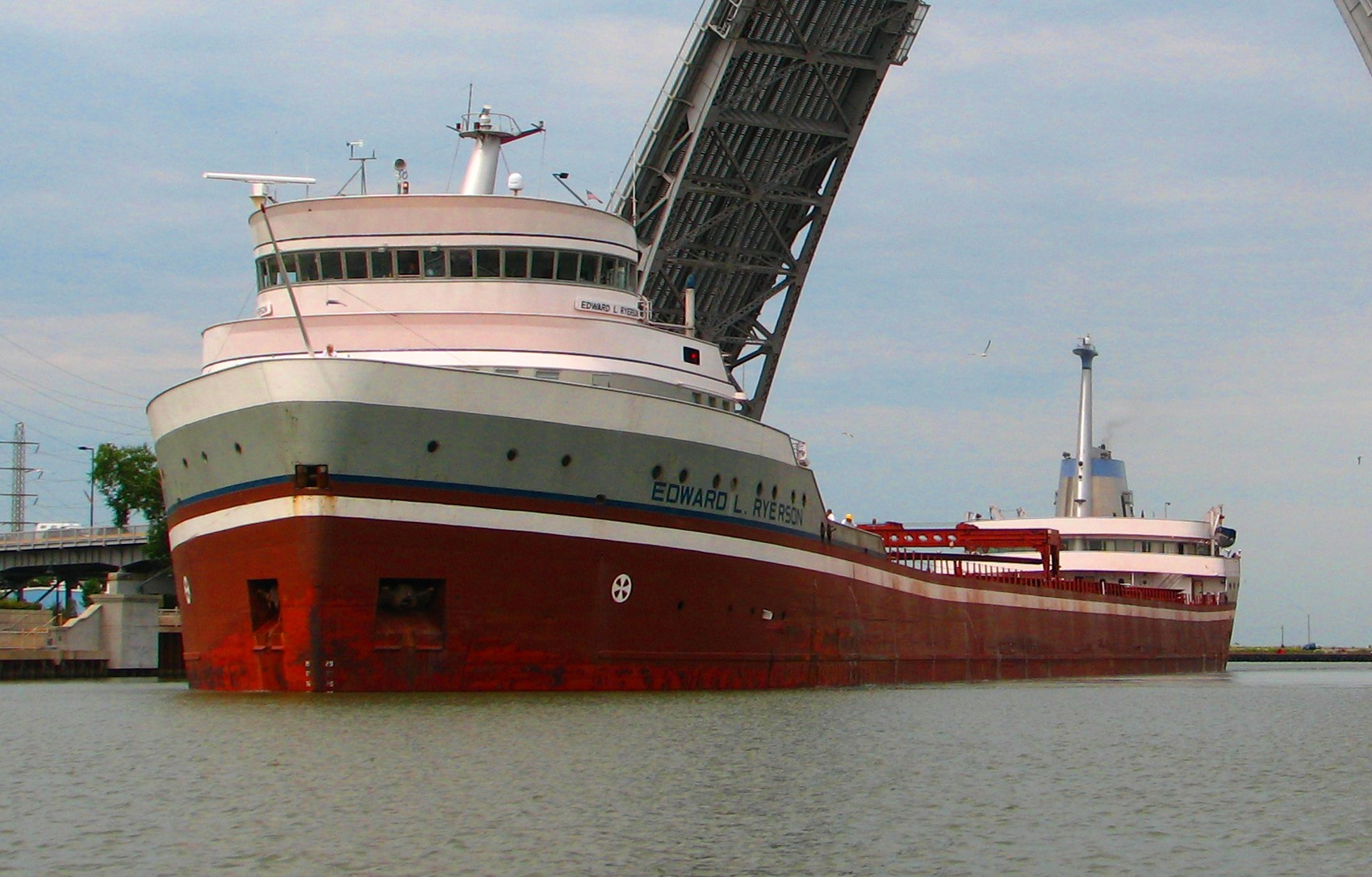
Edward L. Ryerson, a lake freighter built for Inland Steel and launched in 1960

At 760 feet in length, the SS Edward L. Ryerson entered service in 1960. Because she was designed for optimal service in transporting iron ore, the cargo hold of the Edward L Ryerson was smaller than other ships of comparable overall size and had a square bottom.

In 1998, she was acquired by the Indiana Harbor Steamship Company and was under management of Central Marine Logistics. Edward L Ryerson entered her first long-term layup around that time, which lasted until 2006. In 2009, she entered another period of inactivity.

=== SS Clarence B. Randall ===
In 1962, Inland purchased the 552 foot long J.J. Sullivan. Following the acquisition, the 55 year-old ship was renamed Clarence B Randall. Although she had numerous incidents under her previous name and ownership, Clarence B Randall only had one while serving the Inland Fleet. She ran aground in 1973, but was able to free herself a short tine later without receiving any damage. She was sold in 1976 for conversion to a storage barge. During this process, a cutter's torch ignited a fire. The galley and three staterooms were damaged. Clarence B. Randall was sold three more times before being scrapped in 1987.

=== MV Joseph L. Block ===
In 1976, the newly constructed MV Joseph L Block entered service for Inland. At 728 feet in length, she had a carrying capacity of over 37,000 tons. She had two groundings in 1990, with one minor in nature and the other causing significant damage. Joseph L Block came under the ownership of Indiana Harbor Steamship Company and the management of Central Marine Logistics in 1998.

Following this, she had minor grounding incidents in 1999 and 2010. In 2006, the crew of Joseph L Block rescued a kayaker who was 32 miles off the shore of Lake Michigan. In 2024, still in service, the Joseph L Block opened the shipping season as the first commercial vessel to go through the locks at Sault Ste. Marie.

=== MV Adam E. Cornelius ===
MV Adam E. Cornelius was leased from the American Steamship Company in 1994. Built in 1973 as the Roger M. Kyes, she was 680 feet in length. She was involved in many incidents that required repairs, most of them groundings. In one notable mishap in 1983, her aft mast struck the I-75 freeway bridge over Rouge River. Roger M. Kyes delivered its cargo, but was unable to clear the bottom of the bridge on the way out. She returned to the dock, and a work crew was called in to remove the mast.

In 1989, she was renamed Adam E. Cornelius. While leased by Inland, she retained her name, but was repainted with the Inland paint scheme and its logo. Shortly after starting with Inland, repairs were needed on a ballast tank that was punctured in a grounding. In 1997, ice damage caused severe flooding in her forward compartments, necessitating another trip to the shipyard. Adam E. Cornelius was returned to American Steamship Company in 1998, and continued service there.

== Leadership ==
=== President ===
1. Joseph E. Porter, 1893–1898
2. George H. Jones, 1898–1906
3. Charles Hart, 1906–1908
4. Alexis W. Thompson, 1908–1919
5. Philip D. Block, 1919–1941
6. Wilfred Sykes, 1941–1949
7. Clarence B. Randall, 1949–1953
8. Joseph L. Block, 1953–1959
9. John F. Smith Jr., 1959–1966
10. Frederick G. Jaicks, 1966–1971
11. Michael Tenenbaum, 1971–1978
12. Frank W. Luerssen, 1978–1984
13. Robert J. Darnall, 1984–1996

=== Chairman of the Board ===
1. Alexis W. Thompson, 1906–1919
2. Leigh E. Block, 1919–1940
3. Edward L. Ryerson, 1940–1953
4. Clarence B. Randall, 1953–1959
5. Joseph L. Block, 1959–1967
6. Philip D. Block, 1967–1969
7. Frederick G. Jaicks, 1969–1983
8. Frank W. Luerssen, 1983–1999
