= Illinois–Indiana State Line Boundary Marker =

Illinois-Indiana State Line Boundary Marker
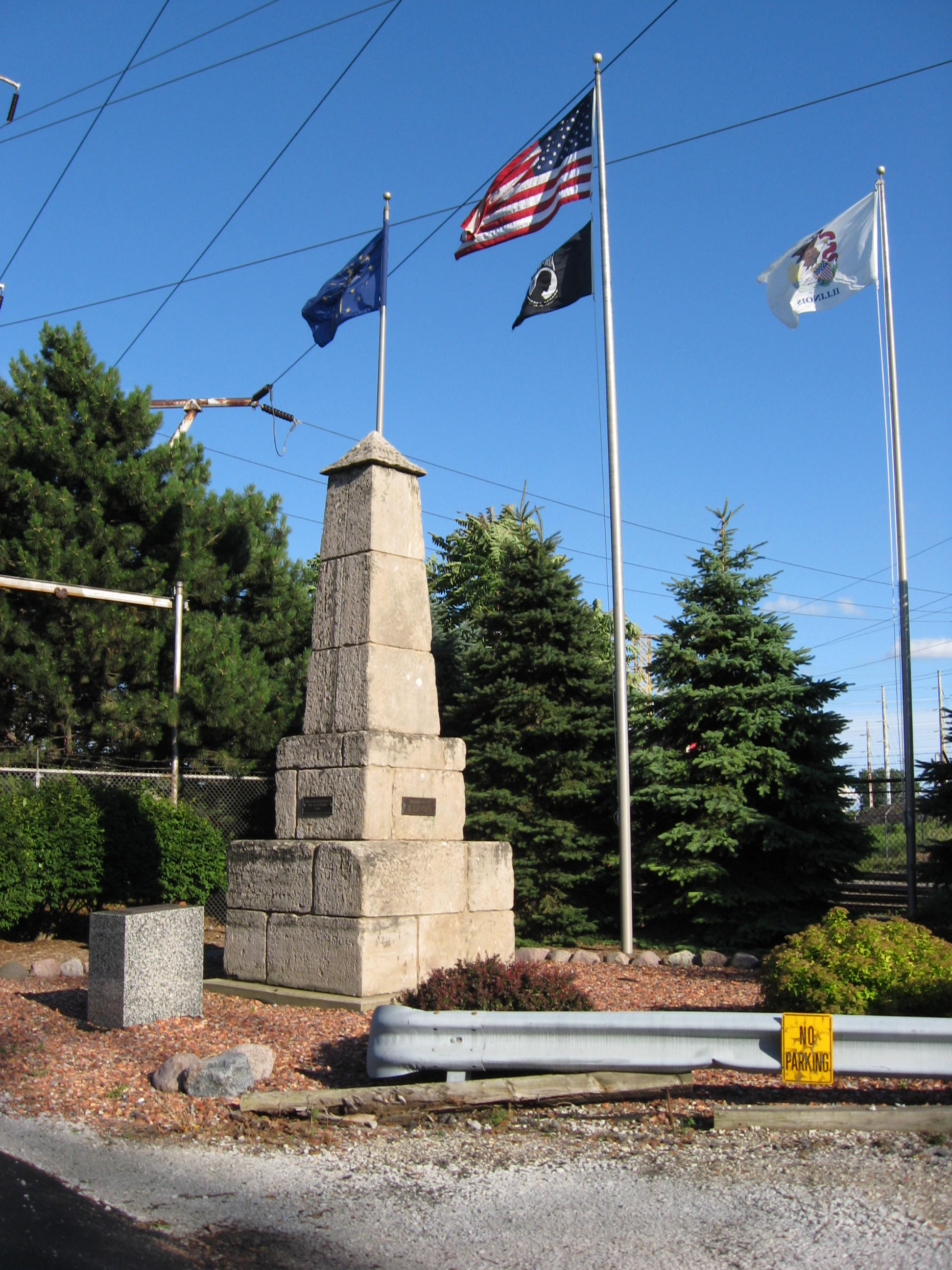
- Illinois-Indiana State Line Boundary Marker
- Location: Chicago, Illinois/Hammond, Indiana, United States
- Coordinates: 41°42′28.25″N 87°31′28.25″W
- Built: 1838

Chicago Landmark
- Designated: September 4, 2002

The Illinois–Indiana State Line Boundary Marker is a limestone obelisk that commemorates the establishment of the border between Illinois and Indiana.

Constructed by the Office of the United States Surveyor General in 1838, its current location near the northernmost point between the two states straddles the line between the cities of Hammond and Chicago, near the end of Avenue G on Chicago's East Side and just west of the former location of the State Line Generating Plant in Hammond.

The obelisk is composed of large limestone blocks, standing more than 15½ feet (4.7 meters) and weighing more than 38,000 pounds. It replaced a pine post that had been erected in 1821. The marker sits 159.359 miles (256.46 kilometers) due north of where the straight-line border meets the Wabash River, which serves as the remainder of the border between the two states.

The obelisk's original location, 191.09 feet (58.24 m) south of its present location, was near the Lake Michigan shoreline at that time. By the 1980s, however, due to landfill related to the area's industrial development, the shoreline had shifted several hundred feet north, and the obelisk was hard to find and damaged by graffiti in a remote wooded location. In 1988, thanks to local conservation efforts, it was moved to a safer, more easily accessible location next to the guard house for the State Line Generating Plant.

The coal-burning generating plant closed in 2012 and was torn down soon after, leaving the marker's future uncertain once again. Then in 2021, Hammond and Chicago collaborated to build a small park, called State Line Plaza.

The boundary marker is considered the third oldest man-made structure inside Chicago's city limits, after only the Noble-Seymour-Crippen House (1833) and the Henry B. Clarke House (1836). The marker was awarded Chicago Landmark status on September 4, 2002.
