= United States Housing Corporation =

American WWI federal agency

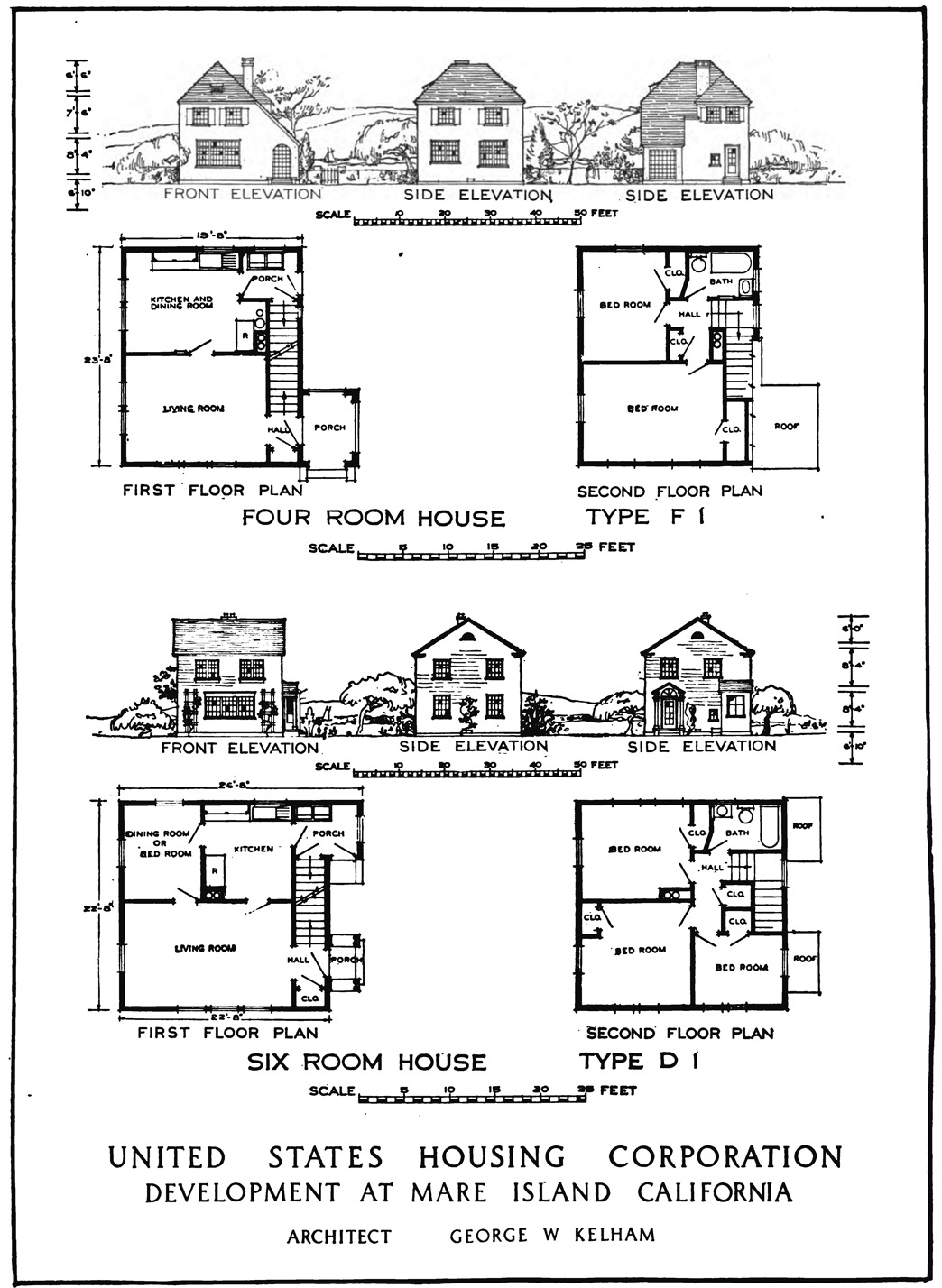
Plans and elevations of typical USHC housing

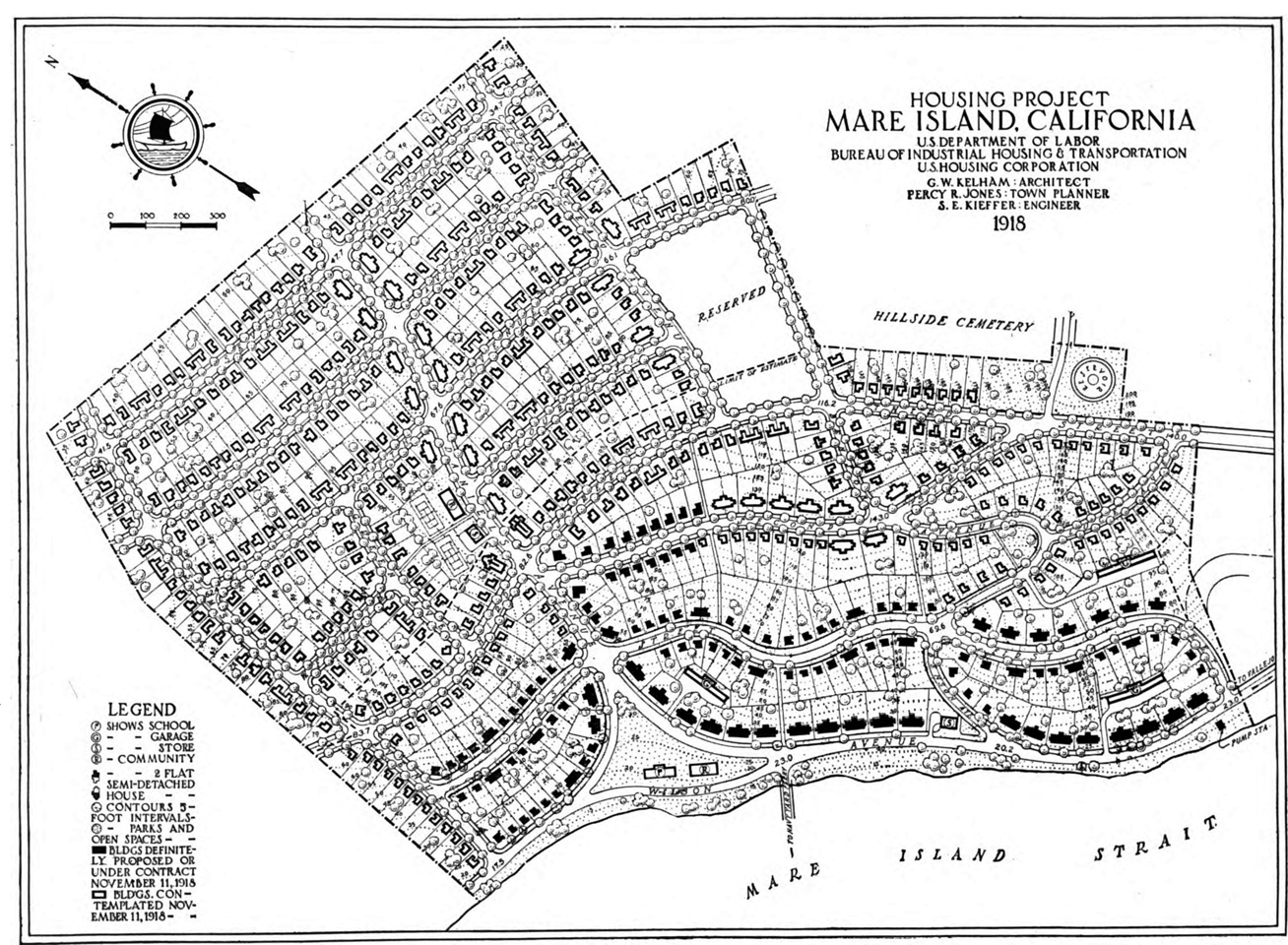
Site plan of USHC development at Mare Island, California

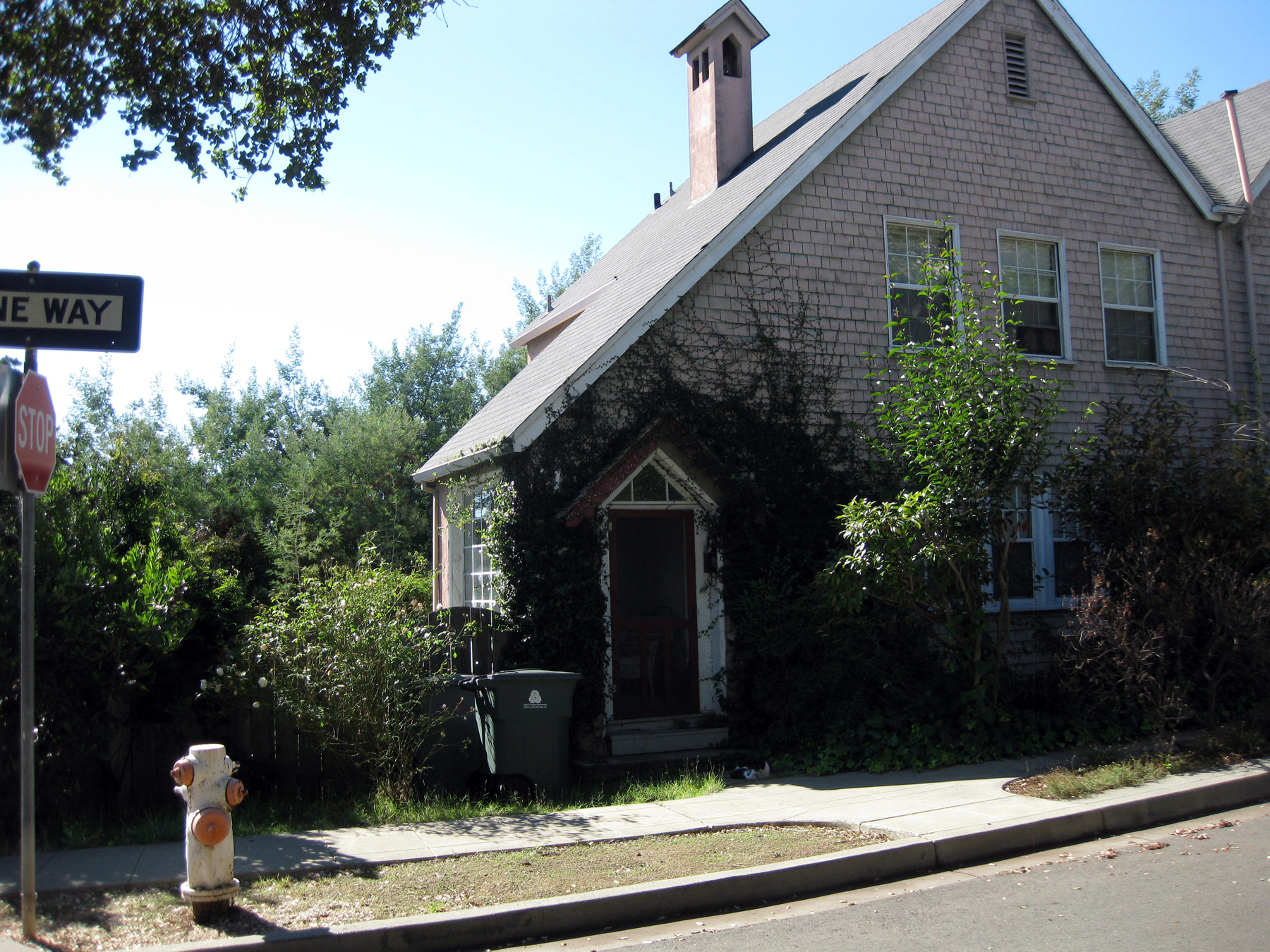
USHC housing at Mare Island, CA in 2011

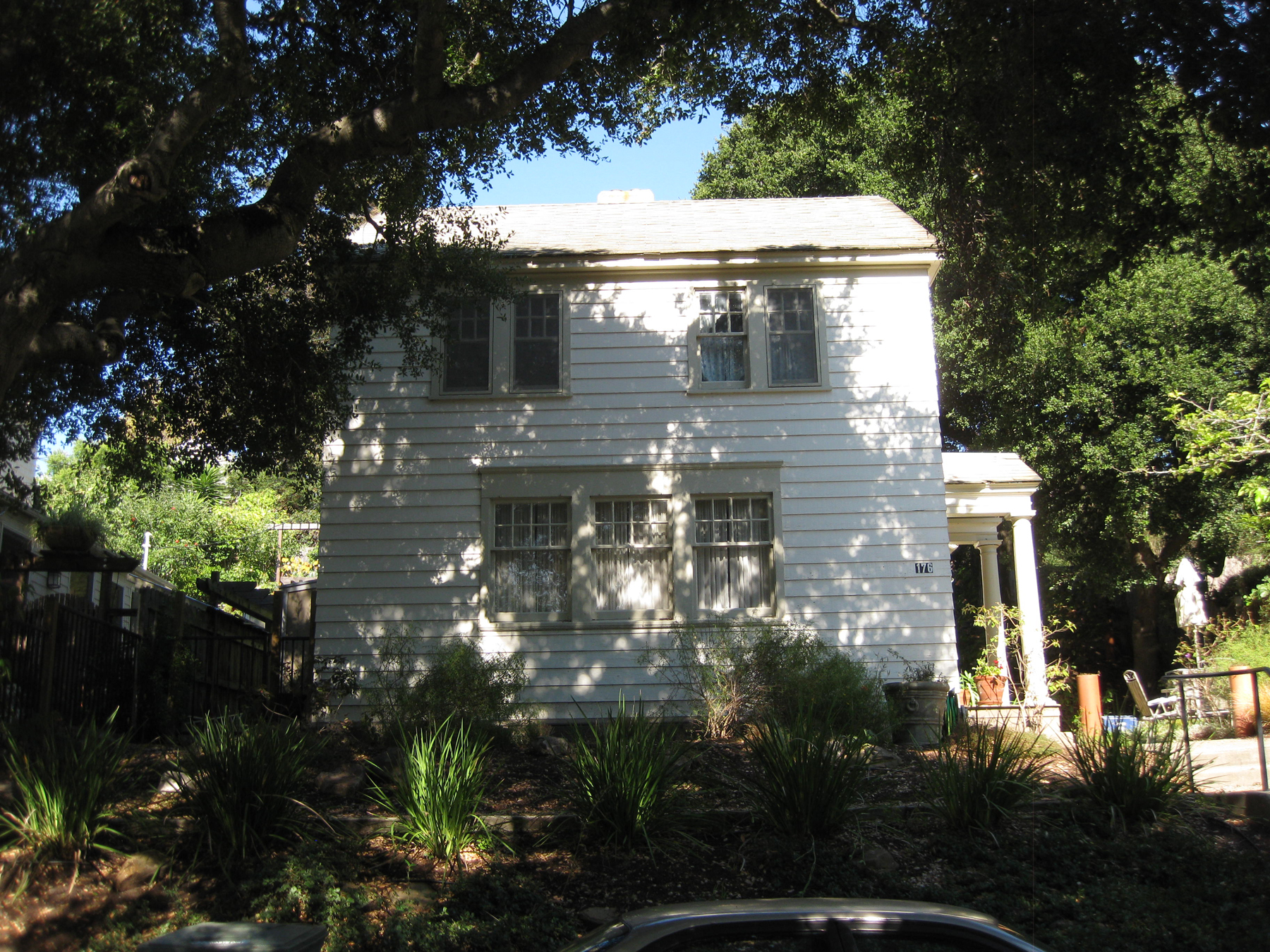
USHC housing at Mare Island, CA in 2011

The United States Housing Corporation (USHC) was a Federal agency that was created during World War I to provide housing for wartime production workers near arsenals and shipyards.

== Context ==
With a massive wartime shipbuilding program underway, tens of thousands of workers flooded into the communities surrounding shipyards. Large amounts of new housing needed to be quickly constructed in order to carry out the war effort. However, rather than approaching the problem as one of temporary housing, the government saw an opportunity to create quality neighborhoods that would become integrated into the physical and social fabric of their surroundings.

The Council of National Defense, studying the question of how to provide housing for war workers, advised that the work be delegated to the Department of Labor. In the first half of 1918, Congress appropriated funds for this housing to be built, and on July 9, 1918, the USHC was incorporated, as a unit of the Department of Labor's Bureau of Industrial Housing and Transportation.

Within a period of two years, over 83 new housing projects in 26 states were designed, planned and had commenced construction. By the end of the war, a total of 5,033 acres had been developed into housing for over 170,000 people. Although some of the agency's projects were small and consisted of only a few dozen dwellings, others were larger and approached the dimensions of new towns. For example, Cradock in Portsmouth, Virginia, was designed on a 310-acre site with over 800 detached houses; Truxtun was the first wartime government housing project constructed exclusively for African-American residents in the United States. Mare Island, in San Francisco Bay, had 231 detached and 200 semi-detached houses, along with schools, community centers and stores on a 52-acre site.

These housing projects far exceeded in design and planning any immediate needs brought on by the housing shortage. The architects, planners, and engineers involved were also interested in testing out ideas that heretofore had been only subjects of theoretical debate. These ideas related to decentralization of the industrial city, promotion of regionalism, infusion of nature into everyday life, and improving the living conditions of the working class.

Today, many of these developments are still very much intact physically, though in some cases their social and cultural makeup has changed dramatically, for example in the Baker Yacht Basin neighborhood in Quincy, Massachusetts, the majority of current inhabitants are recent Asian immigrants.

== Significance ==
USHC is significant for being the first time the federal government adopted design principles and standards for neighborhood planning. These guidelines and standards became the most comprehensive manual on town planning and housing standards in existence in the United States at that time. They covered a broad range of topics, from large-scale site planning, down to the design of individual houses, to details such as street lamps. The design principles developed by the USHC had a major influence on the subsequent design of residential neighborhoods in the US, and on the profession of urban planning.

USHC is also notable for having employed some of the nation's first city planners and landscape architects, including such individuals as Henry Wright, Clarence Stein, and Frederick Law Olmsted Jr.

After the war, the influence of the USHC continued to be felt. In 1923, for example, many of the architects and planners who had worked for USHC during the war formed the Regional Plan Association of America (RPAA), which went on to build model developments across the country. The success of the USHC projects inspired many American designers to examine new ideas about town planning, housing standards, and the government's involvement in housing well after the war was over.

== Design ==
At the time of World War I, the Garden City movement was near the peak of its influence, and almost all of the USHC developments incorporated typical Garden City principles: a distinct community with its own identity; a park-like environment with an abundance of well distributed open space; roads designed according to their planned level of use with few sharp turns; a mix of housing types all designed with ample front, side and rear yards; and strict land use zoning. Some of the interior design plans featured innovations to make the most efficient use of small living spaces – for example, furniture that could be hidden away when not in use.

In order to make the housing affordable for workers, some of the communities were designed at relatively high density (for example, 13 families per acre at the Baker Yacht Basin neighborhood in Quincy, MA). The designers took great care in laying out these neighborhoods to provide light and air, avoid overcrowding, and ensure access to parks.

Employing local architects, many of the buildings displayed artistic innovation while corresponding to the regional styles, climatic needs and local construction techniques. It was common to find variation on the Arts and Crafts bungalow on the West Coast and red brick renditions of Colonial architecture on the East. Some of these designs were very original when it came to conforming to a new set of minimum standards and constrained budgets.

Some of the neighborhoods were not fully completed, because the War ended before they were fully built out. In most of these cases, the surrounding communities incorporated the USHC schemes into their own master plans.

== Sites ==
- Aberdeen, MD
- Alliance, OH (2 sites)
- Alton, IL (3 sites)
- Bath, ME
- Bethlehem, PA
- Bremerton, WA
- Bridgeport, CT (8 sites)
- Butler, PA
- Charleston, SC
- Charleston, WV
- Chester, PA (2 sites)
- Dayton, OH (2 sites)
- East Moline, IL (2 sites)
- Elizabeth, NJ (3 sites)
- Erie, PA (2 sites)
- Florence, AL
- Hammond, IN
- Ilion, NY
- Indianapolis, IN
- Indianhead, MD
- Kenilworth, NJ
- Lyles, TN (2 sites)
- Lowell, MA (2 sites)
- Mare Island (Vallejo), CA
- Milton, PA (2 sites)
- Moline, IL
- Muskegon, MI (2 sites)
- Neville Island, PA
- New Brunswick, NJ
- New Castle, DE
- New London, CT (2 sites)
- New Orleans, LA
- Newport News, VA (2 sites)
- Newport, RI (2 sites)
- Niagara Falls, NY (3 sites)
- Niles, OH
- Norfolk-Portsmouth, VA (Truxtun site)
- Pensacola, FL
- Perth Amboy, NJ
- Philadelphia, PA (2 sites)
- Pompton Lakes, NJ
- Port Penn, DE
- Portsmouth, NH
- Portsmouth, OH
- Puget Sound, WA
- Quincy, MA (3 sites)
- Rock Island, IL
- Rock Island District, IL (3 sites)
- Seven Pines, VA
- Sharon, PA
- Sheffield, AL
- South Amboy, NJ
- South Bend, IN
- Stamford, CT
- Staten Island, NY
- Tullytown, PA
- Tuscumbia, AL
- Warren, OH (2 sites)
- Washington, D.C.
- Washington, D.C. (Navy Yard)
- Waterbury, CT (2 sites)
- Watertown, NY
- Watervliet (Troy), NY

== See also ==
- Mare Island Naval Shipyard
- Pullman-Standard Historic District
