= Forest–Ivanhoe Residential Historic District =

Historic district in Indiana, United States

- U.S. National Register of Historic Places
- U.S. Historic district
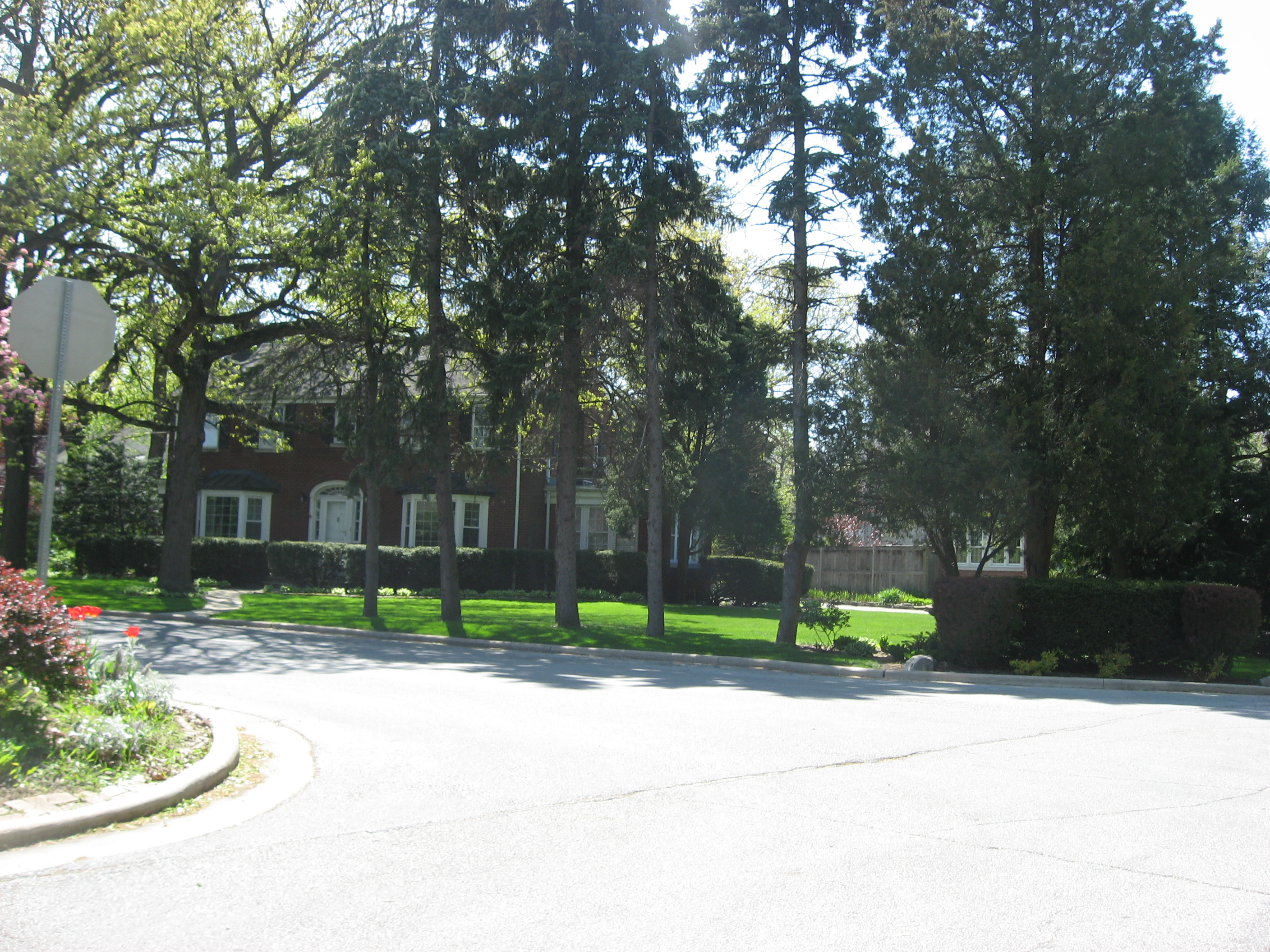
- Forest–Ivanhoe Residential Historic District, April 2012

- Location within Indiana Location within the United States
- Location: Roughly bounded by 172nd Pl., E. side of Forest Ave. S to its end, and the Little Calumet River, Hammond, Indiana
- Coordinates: 41°34′51″N 87°31′25″W
- Area: 17.5 acres (7.1 ha)
- Architect: Bernard, Leslie Cosby, Sr.
- Architectural style: Late 19th And 20th Century Revivals, English Cottage
- MPS: Historic Residential Suburbs in the United States, 1830-1960 MPS
- NRHP reference No.: 10000124
- Added to NRHP: March 31, 2010

Forest–Ivanhoe Residential Historic District is a national historic district located at Hammond, Indiana. The district encompasses 25 contributing buildings in an exclusively residential section of Hammond. The development began before 1923, the year its first house was constructed, on what had been "Eggebrech's Second Tract" that was sold around 1919. The builder Karl Hohenberger obtained the land and then saw his real estate development financed in part by Al Capone, who enabled him to build the first house according to his specifications that included steel skeleton to support the massive weight of a Spanish barrel-tile roof and concrete floors between the house's stories. This house also features the inclusion of steel plates in its outside walls in order to render it bullet-proof to the standards of the day. Capone and his organization used this house as a collection point for the proceeds of their bootlegged liquor, prostitution and other rackets that went on unchecked in Hammond until the early 1930s. The house was employed as a detention point for those customers of Capone who were unable to pay him timely and has bulletholes on its outside and inside to attest to the ruthlessness of that notorious criminal organization. Numerous spent .22 caliber bullets have turned up in the back patio from this era. The house was seized under a writ of judicial forfeiture in 1932 by Judge Henry Clay Cleveland, whose wife Florence Hammond was the granddaughter of George Hammond, city founder and proprietor of its meat-packing operation. It developed between about 1925 and 1952, and includes notable example of Colonial Revival, Tudor Revival, Spanish Colonial and English Cottage style residential architecture. Most of the residences have attached garages.

It was listed in the National Register of Historic Places in 2010.
