= Gary–Hammond barrier =

City border in Indiana, United States

Coordinates: 41°35′43″N 87°25′59″W

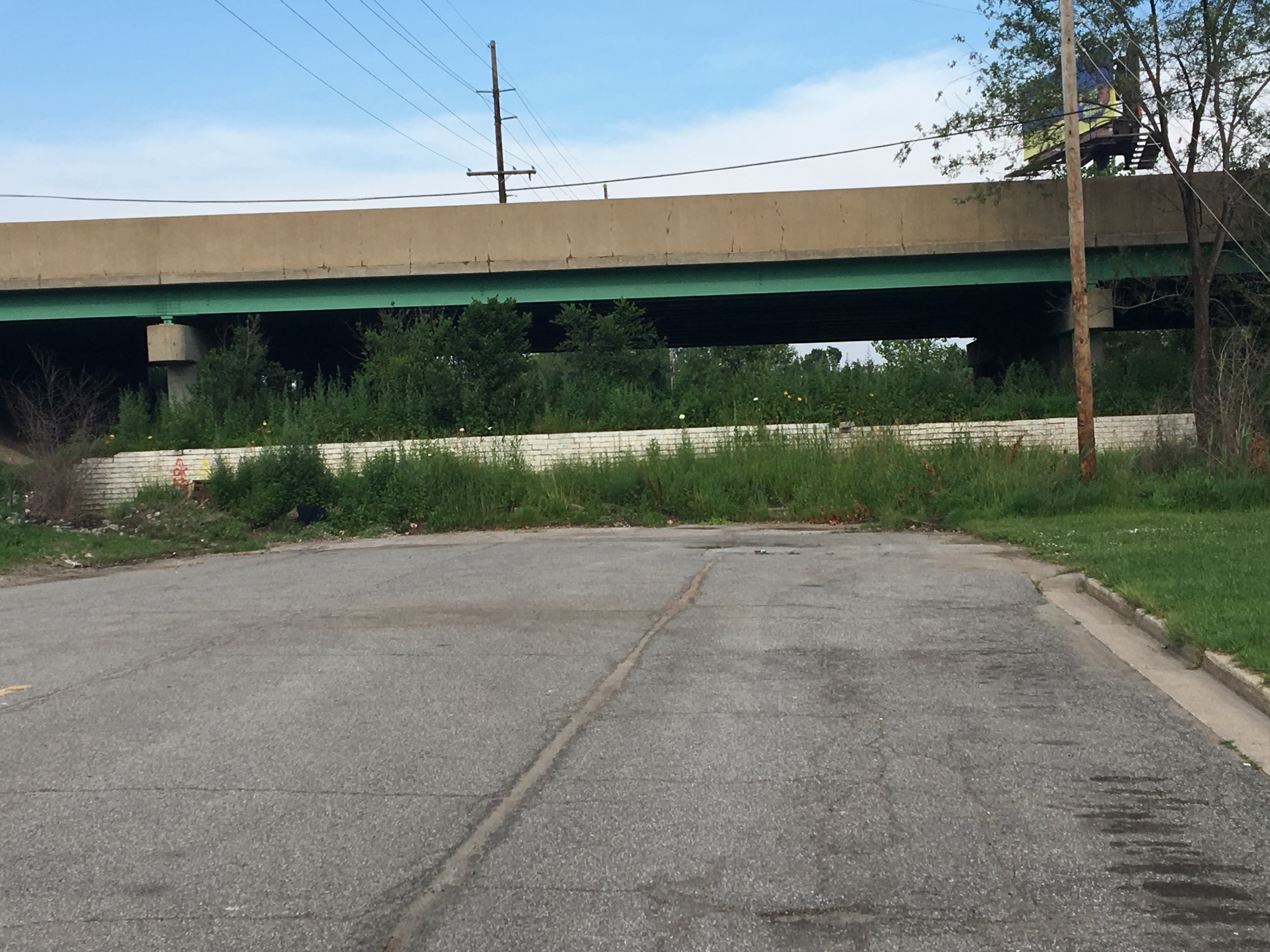
Hammond/Gary Barrier on 165th Street as seen from Hammond side. Photo taken on July 6th 2019.

In 1981, the city council of Hammond, Indiana, constructed a barrier or dike where 165th Street meets the border of Gary, to keep toxic flood water out. Originally intended as temporary, the barrier sparked years of controversy between then mostly-White Hammond and mostly-Black Gary. The barrier remains there to this day.

== History ==
In June 1981, excessive rainfall caused flooding in the Calumet Region of Indiana and Illinois. The Little Calumet River overflowed onto streets and Interstate 80. Parts of Gary, Hammond, and other areas were evacuated. The floods swept through two industrial landfills and caused toxic water to flow into the residential Hessville area of Hammond. The toxic water caused basements and streets to flood, and about 30 people suffered chemical burns. In order to stop the flooding, Hammond officials built a 9-foot (3 m) sand dike on 165th Street, under Cline Avenue, along the Hammond-Gary border. 165th Street is one of at least four roads connecting the two cities. Several days later, the City of Hammond built a 4-foot (1 m) concrete wall across 165th Street to reinforce the sand dike, which had been eroding from people driving motorcycles and four-wheel drive vehicles over it. Hammond's air pollution control director said the wall was a temporary solution and would be removed when the danger of chemical runoff ended.

To Hammond officials and citizens, the majority of whom were white, the hill was a win-win. In 1988, Hammond Mayor Thomas McDermott Sr. said, "After seven years, people on this side just like the idea of the street being closed. There is less truck traffic and less crime." In his campaign, Hammond City Council President Robert Golec promised to keep the wall and suggested making it permanent.

The citizens and officials of Gary, the majority of whom are African American, saw it as a symbol of racism and called for it to be removed almost as soon as it went up. Mayor Richard Hatcher called it "an insult to every citizen in Gary" and ordered city workers to tear down the wall six months after its construction. This led to Hammond workers reconstructing the wall entirely on Hammond property. During his successful campaign for Gary Mayor in 1987, Thomas Barnes promised to remove the wall 30 days after his inauguration.

In 1989, the federal government called for Hammond and Gary to develop an alternative to the wall or face reduced transportation funding. Alternatives were developed by engineers of both cities, but Hammond refused to cooperate due to the perceived high cost and impracticality of a new infrastructure project. There was also disagreement about who would pay for the new project; one of the cities or the Federal government.

The furor appeared to have ceased in the 1990s as discussions of an alternative to the barrier stopped and Gary changed leadership. Sometime in the 2010s, the dirt hill was replaced by a brick wall that remains to this day.

== Hammond–Calumet City barrier ==
A curb opposed by Calumet City, Illinois, was built by Hammond in 2006, north of 166th Place in order to restrict vehicular traffic between the two towns. Calumet City sued but lost its legal battle to block construction. In 2008, Mayor Thomas McDermott Jr. built a 4-foot by 2-foot wall south of the earlier one that leads up to the little Calumet River, ostensibly for flood control. "It's a quality of life issue," Mayor Thomas McDermott told the Chicago Tribune at the time. "A lot has been made of race. It has nothing to do with that. It has to do with traffic."

Calumet City Mayor Michelle Markiewicz Qualkinbush told the Tribune in 2006, "It's unfortunate it's come to this. These two communities have co-existed side by side for many years. They'll be here many more years after we're gone, and this, it just sends a bad message."
