= Cradock Historic District =

Historic district in Virginia, United States

- U.S. National Register of Historic Places
- U.S. Historic district
- Virginia Landmarks Register
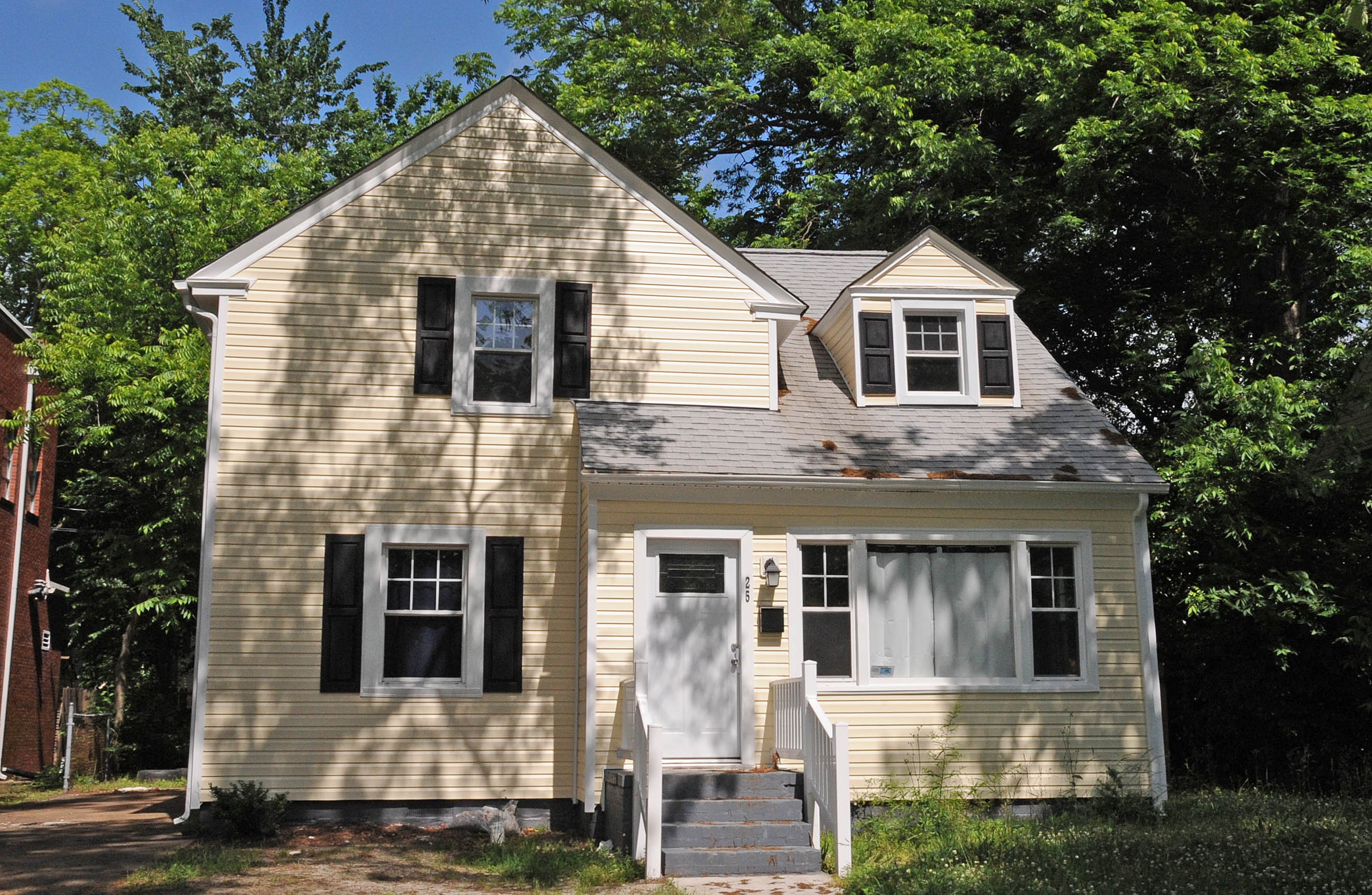
- House on Prospect Way

- Location within Virginia Location within the United States
- Location: Bounded by Paradise Creek, Victory Blvd., and George Washington Hwy., Portsmouth, Virginia
- Coordinates: 36°48′7″N 76°19′4″W
- Area: 310 acres (130 ha)
- Built: 1918
- Architect: Post, George B.,& Sons; Multiple
- Architectural style: Colonial Revival, Bungalow/craftsman
- NRHP reference No.: 74002240
- VLR No.: 124-0037

Significant dates
- Added to NRHP: June 20, 1974
- Designated VLR: May 21, 1974

Cradock Historic District is a national historic district located at Portsmouth, Virginia. It encompasses 759 contributing buildings and 1 contributing structure in a primarily residential section of Portsmouth. It was developed starting in 1918, as a planned community of Colonial Revival and Bungalow style single family residences. It was developed by the United States Housing Corporation as a result of the rapid influx of workers at the Norfolk Naval Shipyard during World War I.

It was listed on the National Register of Historic Places in 1974.
