= Truxtun Historic District =

Historic district in Virginia, United States

- U.S. National Register of Historic Places
- U.S. Historic district
- Virginia Landmarks Register
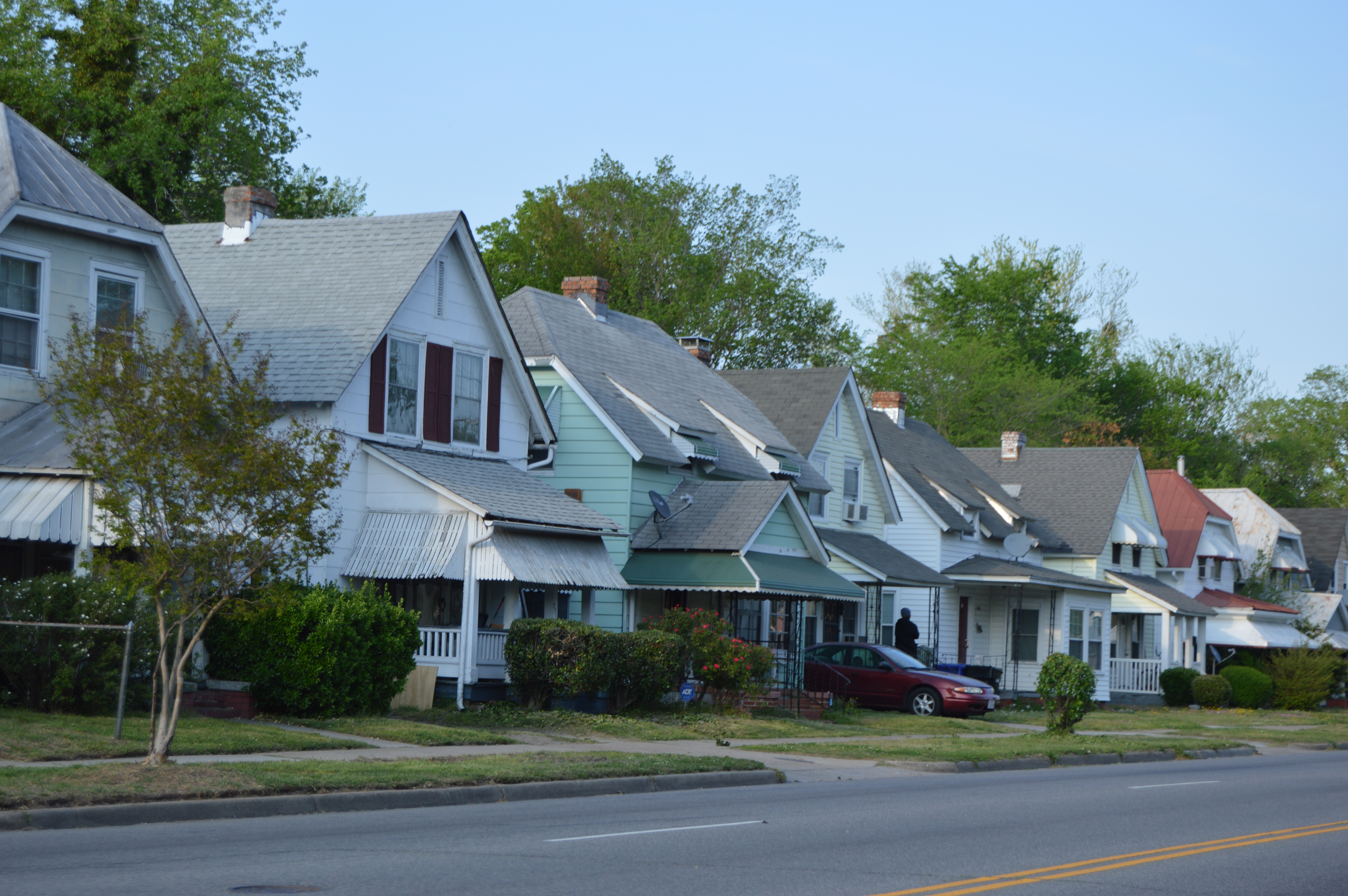
- Portsmouth Boulevard west of Dahlia Street

- Location within Virginia Location within the United States
- Location: Portsmouth and Deep Creek Boulevards and Manly, Dahlia, Hobson, Dewey and Bagley Sts., Portsmouth, Virginia
- Coordinates: 36°48′59″N 76°19′4″W
- Area: 43 acres (17 ha)
- Built: 1918
- Architect: U.S. Housing Corporation; Multiple
- Architectural style: Colonial Revival
- NRHP reference No.: 82004581
- VLR No.: 124-0047

Significant dates
- Added to NRHP: September 16, 1982
- Designated VLR: April 15, 1980

Truxtun Historic District is a national historic district located at Portsmouth, Virginia. It encompasses 241 contributing buildings in a primarily residential section of Portsmouth. It was developed between 1918 and 1920 as a planned community of Colonial Revival style single family residences. It was developed by the United States Housing Corporation as a result of the rapid influx of workers at the Norfolk Naval Shipyard during World War I. It was the first wartime government housing project constructed exclusively for African-American residents. In 1921 the Federal Government sold it off.

It was listed on the National Register of Historic Places in 1982.
