= Roselawn–Forest Heights Historic District =

Historic district in Indiana, United States

- U.S. National Register of Historic Places
- U.S. Historic district
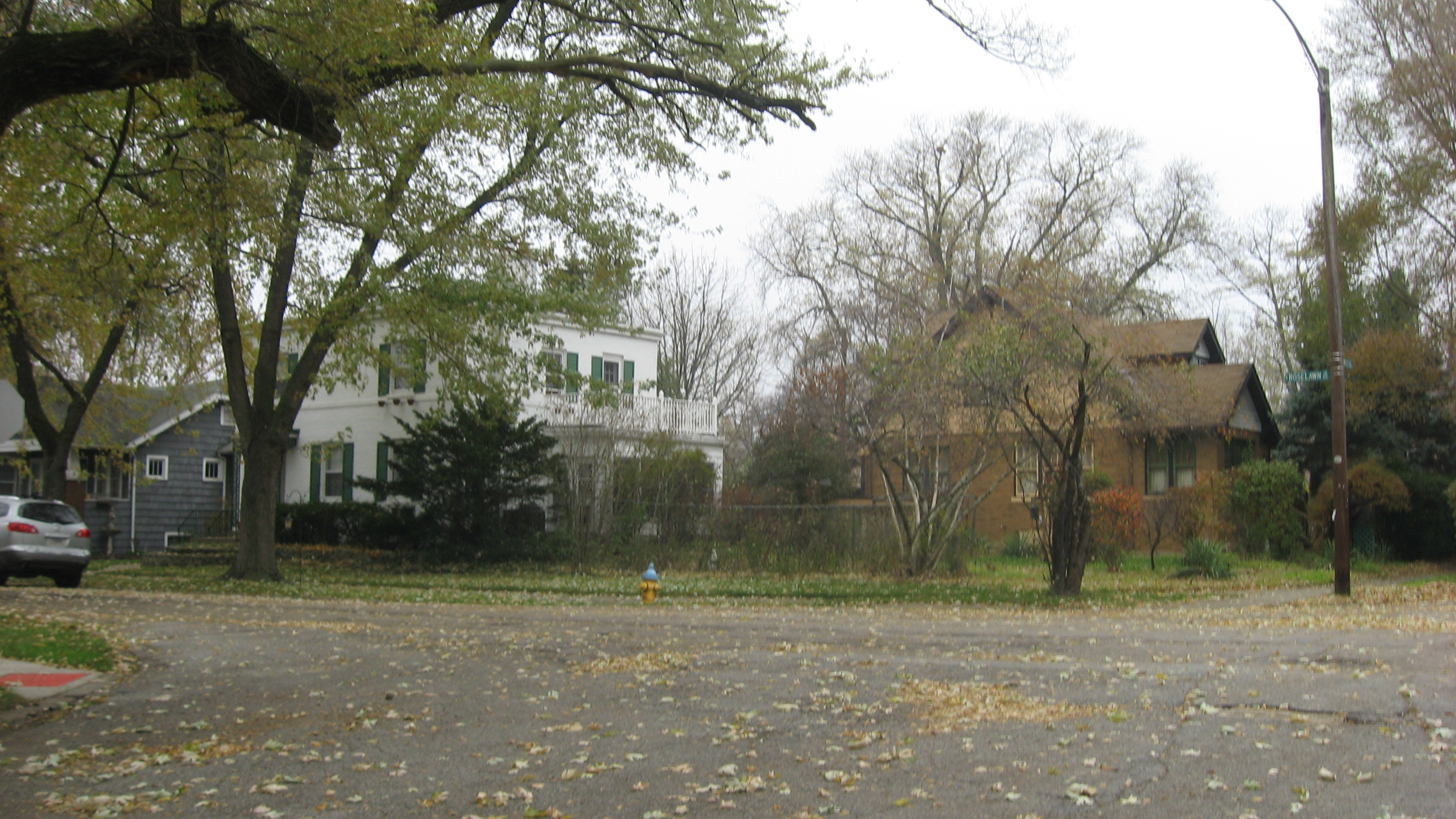
- Roselawn-Forest Heights Historic District, November 2013

- Location within Indiana Location within the United States
- Location: Roughly bounded by Lawndale, 172nd Pl., and Hohman and State Line Aves., Hammond, Indiana
- Coordinates: 41°35′12″N 87°31′26″W
- Area: 14.5 acres (5.9 ha)
- Architect: Bernard, Leslie Cosby, Sr.; Bachman, William L.
- Architectural style: Late 19th And 20th Century Revivals, Bungalow/Craftsman
- MPS: Historic Residential Suburbs in the United States, 1830-1960 MPS
- NRHP reference No.: 12001060
- Added to NRHP: December 19, 2012

Roselawn–Forest Heights Historic District is a national historic district located at Hammond, Indiana. The district encompasses 107 contributing buildings in a predominantly residential section of Hammond. It developed between about 1922 and 1962, and includes notable example of Colonial Revival, Tudor Revival, Bungalow / American Craftsman, and American Small House and eclectic styles of residential architecture. Located in the district is the separately listed George John Wolf House.

It was listed in the National Register of Historic Places in 2012.
