= Forest–Southview Residential Historic District =

Historic district in Indiana, United States

- U.S. National Register of Historic Places
- U.S. Historic district
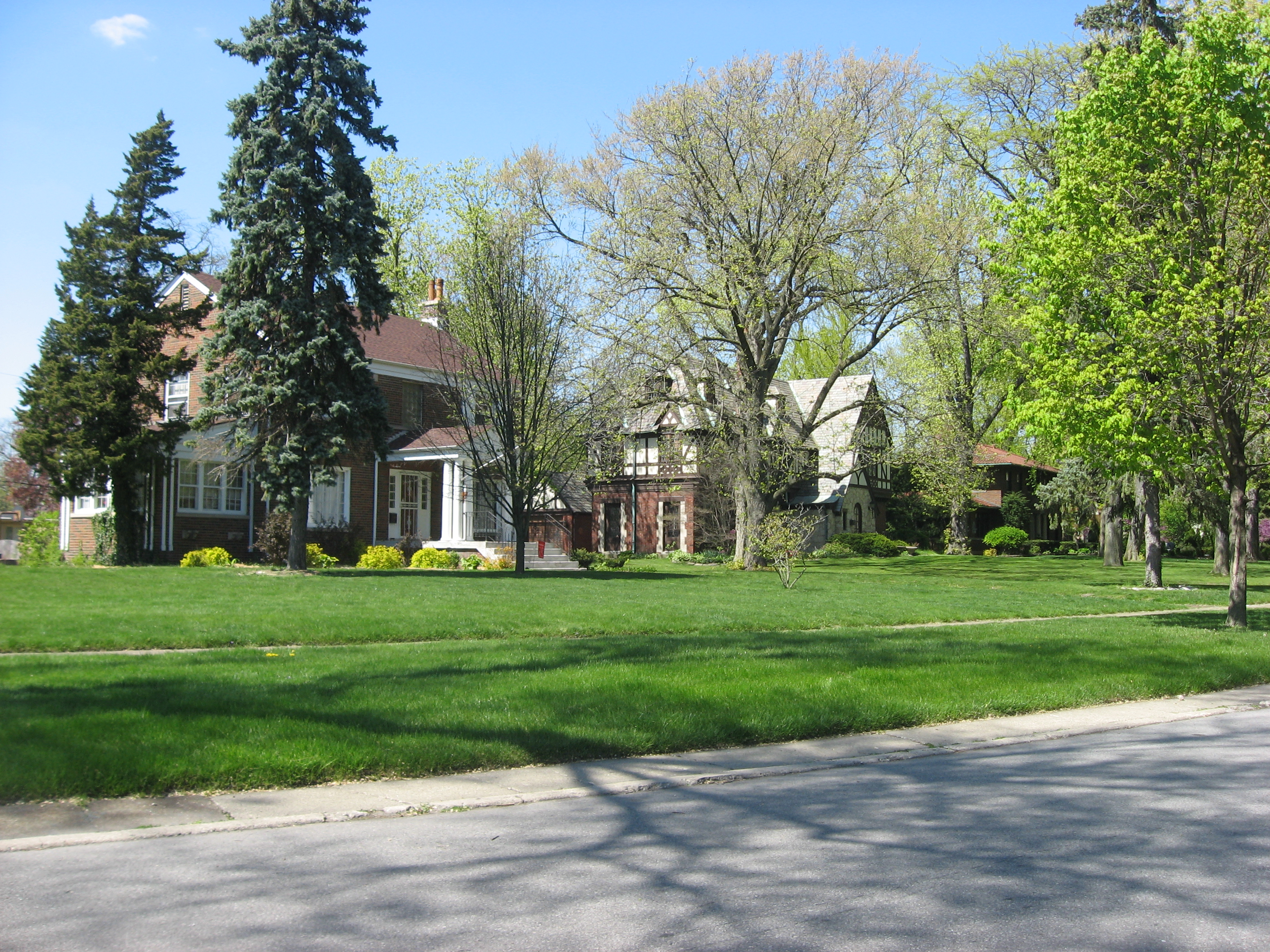
- Forest–Southview Residential Historic District, April 2012

- Location within Indiana Location within the United States
- Location: Roughly bounded by 165th St., Hohman Ave., Locust St. and State Line Ave., Hammond, Indiana
- Coordinates: 41°35′37″N 87°31′25″W
- Area: 14.1 acres (5.7 ha)
- Architect: Bernard, Leslie Cosby, Sr.; Hess & Greenwood
- Architectural style: Late 19th And 20th Century Revivals, Bungalow/Craftsman
- MPS: Historic Residential Suburbs in the United States, 1830-1960 MPS
- NRHP reference No.: 10000778
- Added to NRHP: September 23, 2010

Forest–Southview Residential Historic District is a national historic district located at Hammond, Indiana. The district encompasses 39 contributing buildings and 1 contributing site in an exclusively residential section of Hammond. It developed between about 1912 and 1949, and includes notable example of Renaissance Revival, Colonial Revival, Tudor Revival, and Bungalow / American Craftsman styles of residential architecture.

It was listed in the National Register of Historic Places in 2010.
