= Schleicher (Hammond, Indiana) =

- Neighborhood
- Country: United States
- State: Indiana
- County: Lake County
- City: Hammond
- Elevation: 184 m (604 ft)
- Time zone: UTC-6 (CST)
  - Summer (DST): UTC-5 (CDT)
- ZIP code: 46324
- Area code: 219

Schleicher is a small neighborhood in the southern portion of Hammond, IN. It is south of I-80/94, with US Route 41 (Indianapolis BLVD) bordering it to the east, Columbia AVE to the west, and the Little Calumet River to the south, separating Hammond from Munster, IN.

Schleicher is also the home of Optimist Baseball Fields, located on the western side of the neighborhood where James Whitcomb Riley Elementary (closed in 2005) once stood.

Schleicher is dominated by standard slab, single family homes. Students in this neighborhood attend Frank O'Bannon Elementary and Donald E. Gavit Middle/High School.

== Others ==
- South Hammond
- Hammond, IN
