= George John Wolf House =

Historic house in Indiana, United States

- U.S. National Register of Historic Places
- U.S. Historic district – Contributing property
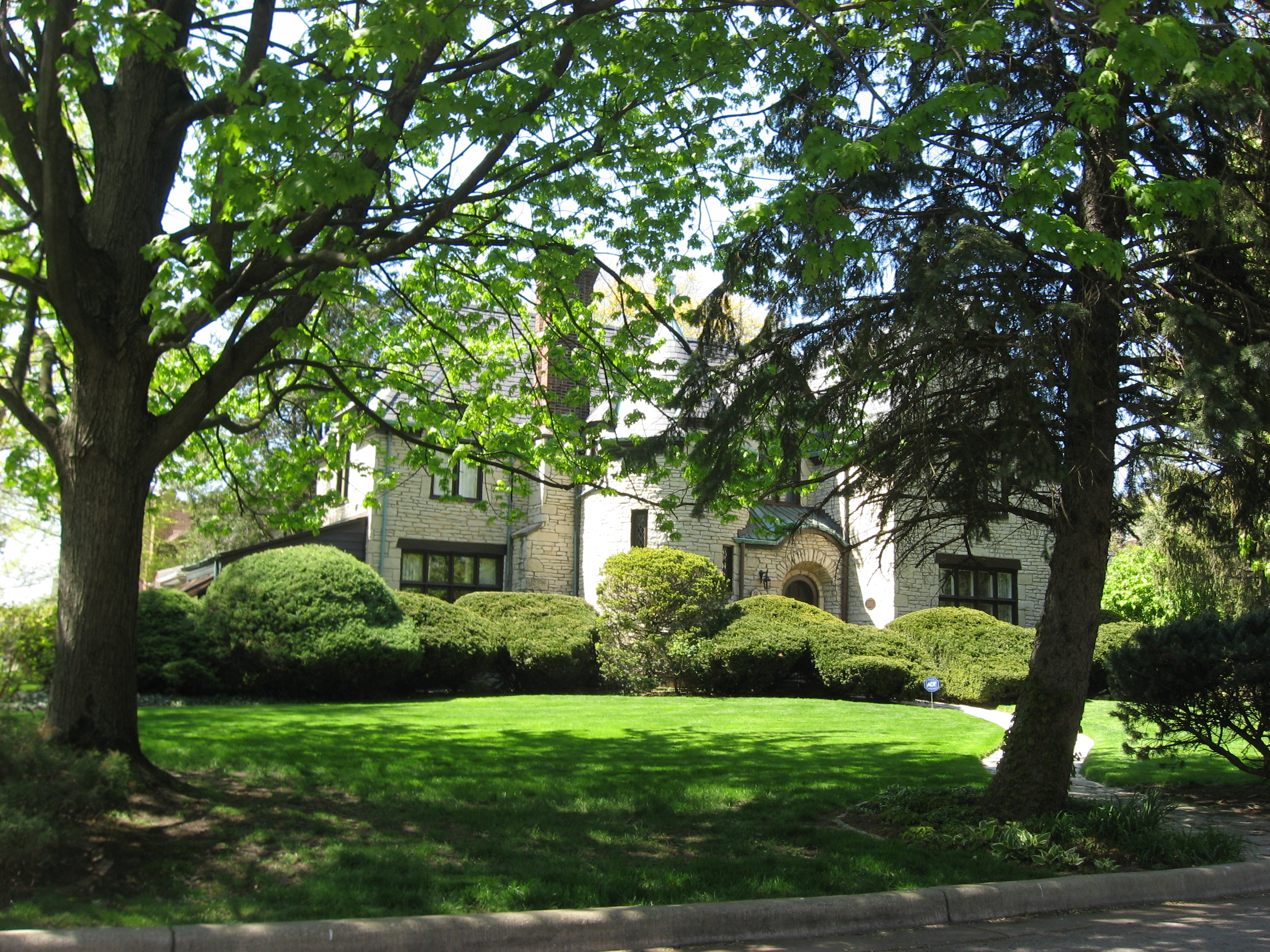
- George John Wolf House, April 2012

- Location within Indiana Location within the United States
- Location: 7220 Forest Ave., Hammond, Indiana
- Coordinates: 41°35′3″N 87°31′26″W
- Area: less than one acre
- Built: 1929-1930
- Architect: Bernard, Leslie Cosby Sr.
- Architectural style: Tudor Revival
- NRHP reference No.: 07000563
- Added to NRHP: June 21, 2007

George John Wolf House, also known as the Wolf-Knapp House, is a historic home located at Hammond, Indiana. The house was built in 1929–1930, and is a two-story, roughly L-shaped, Tudor Revival style limestone dwelling with a slate roof. It features a two-story round tower with a conical roof enclosing a winding staircase.

It was listed in the National Register of Historic Places in 2007. It is located in the Roselawn-Forest Heights Historic District.
