= Glendale Park Historic District =

Historic district in Indiana, United States

- U.S. National Register of Historic Places
- U.S. Historic district
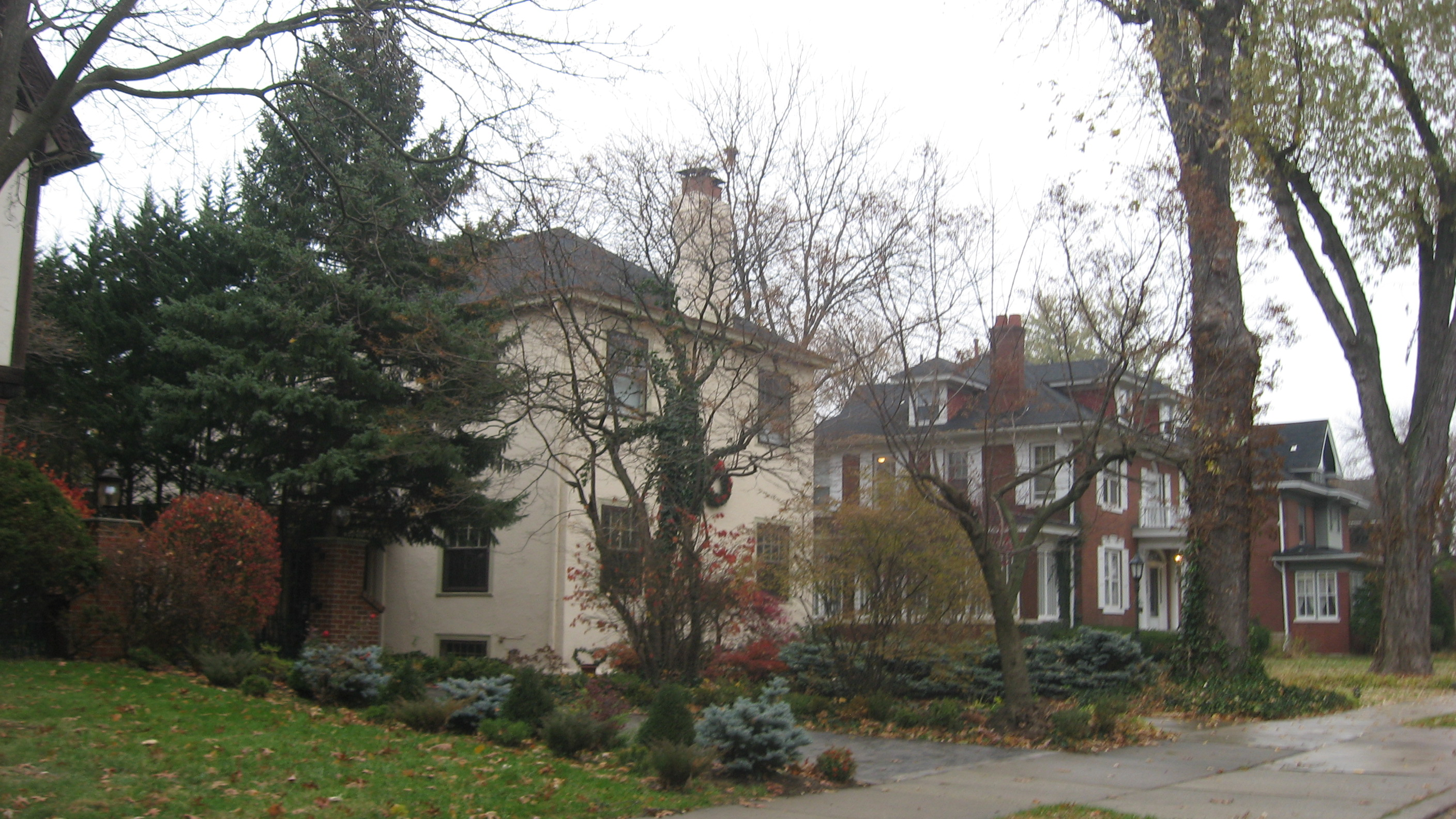
- Glendale Park Historic District, November 2013

- Location within Indiana Location within the United States
- Location: 17-64 Glendale Parkway, Hammond, Indiana
- Coordinates: 41°36′07″N 87°31′24″W
- Area: 11.92 acres (4.82 ha)
- Architect: Berry, Addison, C.; Hutton, J. T.
- Architectural style: Late 19th And 20th Century Revivals, Prairie School, Bungalow/Craftsman
- MPS: Historic Residential Suburbs in the United States, 1830-1960 MPS
- NRHP reference No.: 13000423
- Added to NRHP: June 25, 2013

Glendale Park Historic District is a national historic district located at Hammond, Indiana. The district encompasses 13 contributing buildings and 1 contributing site in an exclusively residential section of Hammond. It developed between about 1905 and 1926, and includes notable example of Colonial Revival, Tudor Revival, Prairie School and Bungalow / American Craftsman styles of residential architecture. The houses are arranged along a parkway with Glendale Park in the center.

It was listed in the National Register of Historic Places in 2013.
