= Northern States Life Insurance Company =

- U.S. National Register of Historic Places
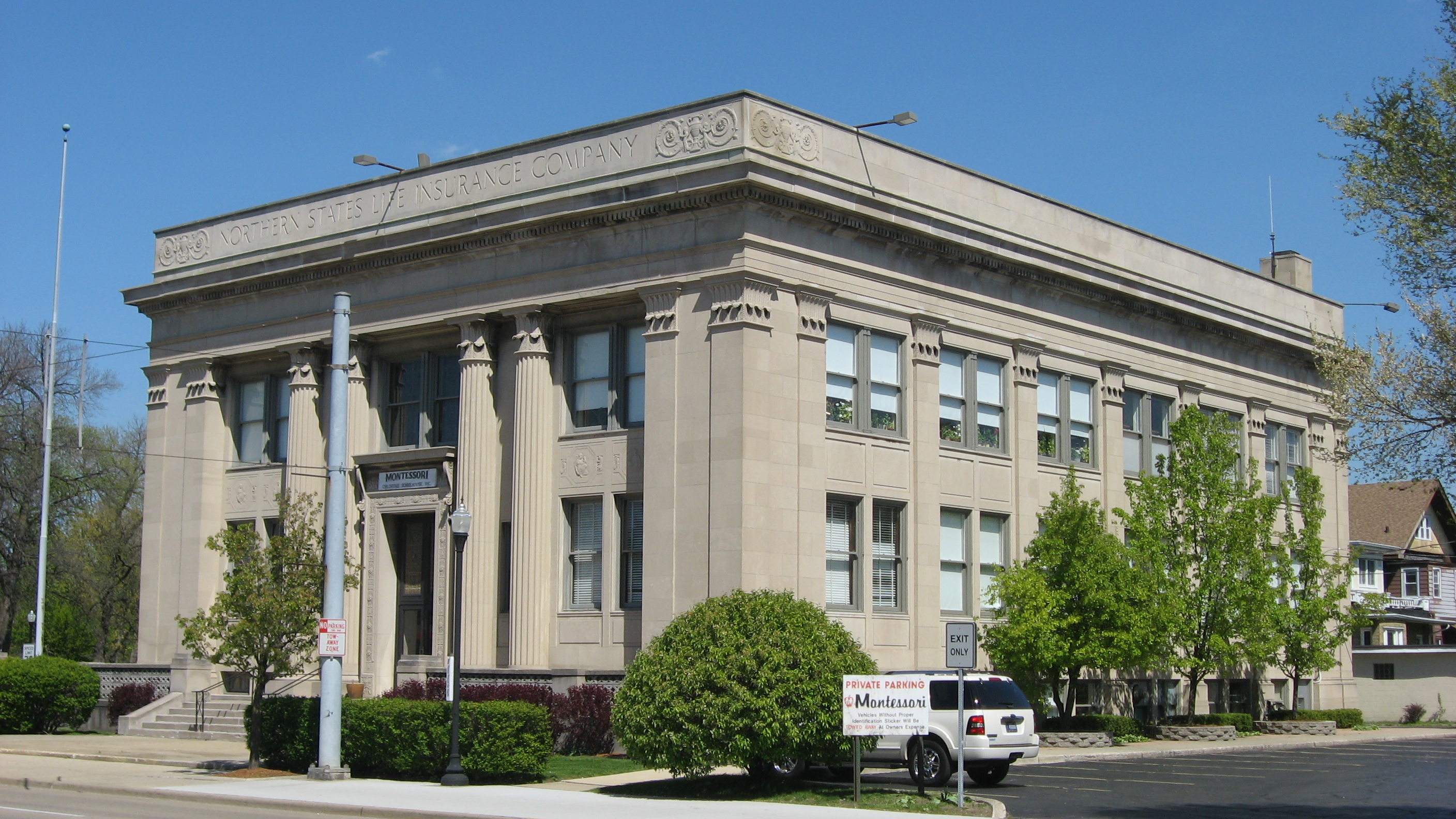
- Northern States Life Insurance Company, April 2012

- Location within Indiana Location within the United States
- Location: 5935 Hohman Ave, Hammond, Indiana
- Coordinates: 41°36′20″N 87°31′18″W
- Area: 2.7 acres (1.1 ha)
- Built: 1926
- Architect: Childs & Smith
- Architectural style: Late 19th And 20th Century Revivals, Classical Revival
- NRHP reference No.: 10000376
- Added to NRHP: June 24, 2010

Northern States Life Insurance Company is a historic office building located at Hammond, Indiana. It was built in 1926, and is a two-story, Classical Revival style limestone building on a partially exposed basement. It features an elevated terrace, engaged columns, and sculptural panels with low relief carvings. The Northern States Life Insurance Company ceased operation in 1930, and the building subsequently housed radio station WWAE (1938–1940), a branch library (1945–1965), Purdue University extension service (1943–1946), Hammond school administrative offices (1946–1984), and school.

It was listed in the National Register of Historic Places in 2010.
