= Southmoor Apartment Hotel =

- U.S. National Register of Historic Places
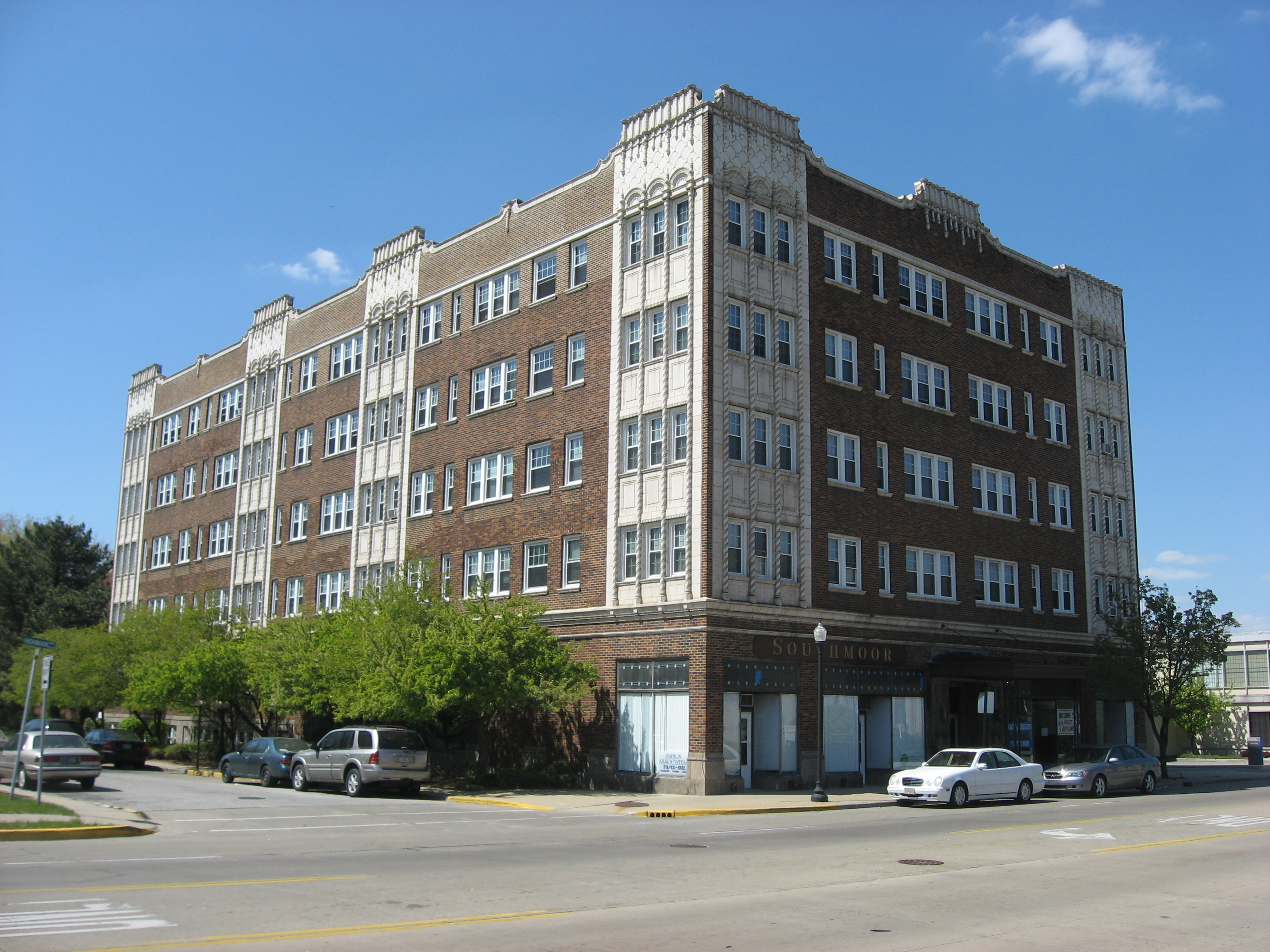
- Southmoor Apartment Hotel, April 2012

- Location within Indiana Location within the United States
- Location: 5946 Hohman Ave., Hammond, Indiana
- Coordinates: 41°36′19″N 87°31′21″W
- Area: 0.4 acres (0.16 ha)
- Built: 1928
- Built by: L. Harry Warriner
- Architectural style: Spanish Eclectic
- NRHP reference No.: 11000125
- Added to NRHP: March 21, 2011

Southmoor Apartment Hotel is a historic apartment hotel located in Hammond, Indiana. It was built in 1928, and is a five-story, "L"-plan building with a reinforced concrete frame and hollow tile exterior sheathed in brick and terra cotta. The building is in the Spanish Colonial Revival style.

It was listed in the National Register of Historic Places in 2011.
