= Pullman–Standard Historic District =

Historic district in Indiana, United States

- U.S. National Register of Historic Places
- U.S. Historic district
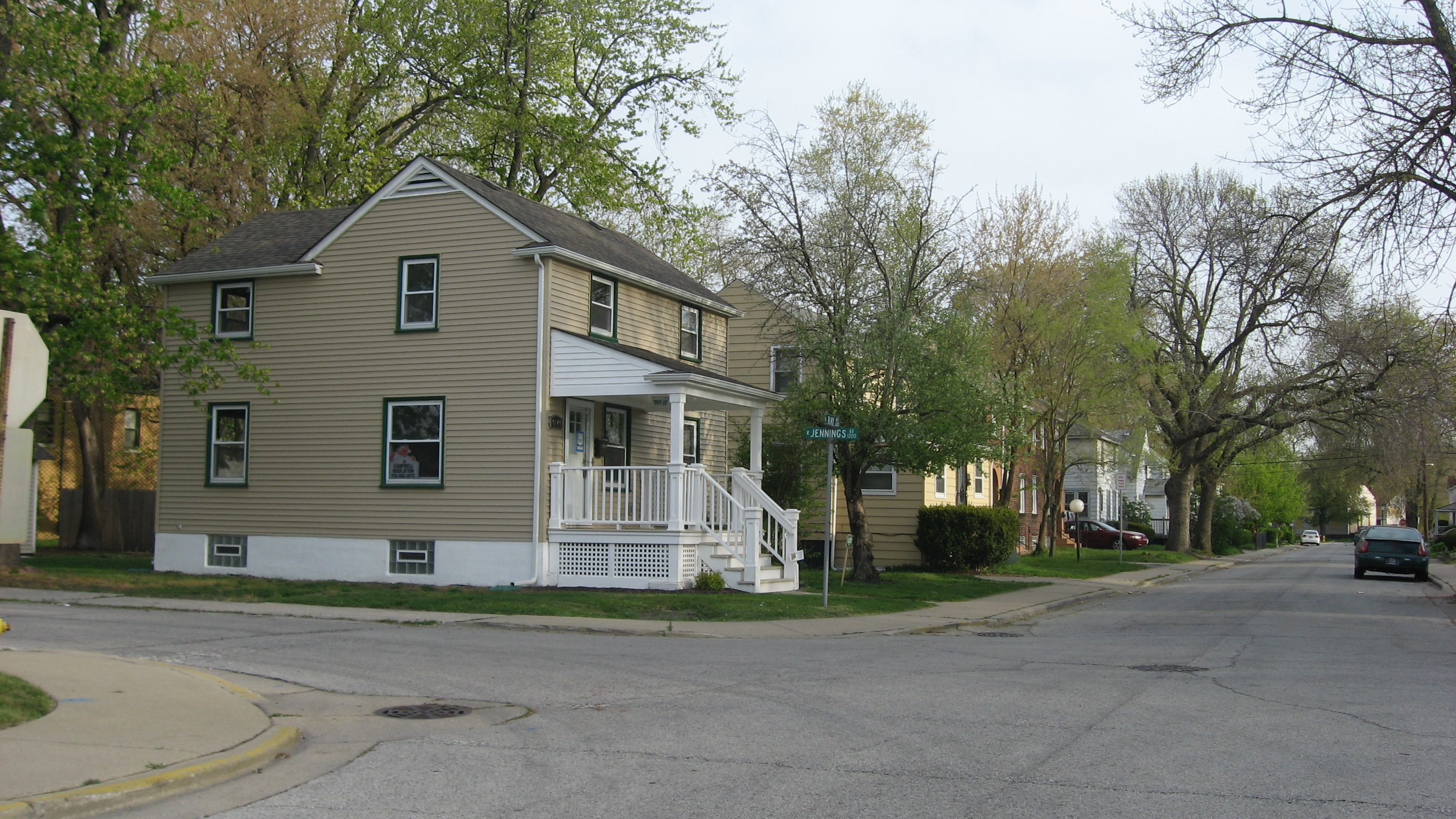
- Pullman–Standard Historic District, April 2012

- Location within Indiana Location within the United States
- Location: Roughly bounded by Columbia, Field, Porter, and Willard Aves., Hammond, Indiana
- Coordinates: 41°36′17″N 87°29′53″W
- Area: 29 acres (12 ha)
- Architect: Bernard, Leslie Cosby, Sr.; Wachewicz, Frank J.
- Architectural style: Colonial Revival, Bungalow/Craftsman, Ranch Style
- MPS: Historic Residential Suburbs in the United States, 1830-1960 MPS
- NRHP reference No.: 12000186
- Added to NRHP: April 10, 2012

Pullman–Standard Historic District is a national historic district located at Hammond, Indiana. The district encompasses 121 contributing buildings and 2 contributing sites in a predominantly residential section of Hammond. It developed between about 1916 and 1918, with some later additions, and includes notable example of Colonial Revival and Bungalow / American Craftsman styles of residential architecture. Most of the homes were originally constructed by the United States Housing Corporation as Industrial Housing Project No. 457. There are three main housing types: Single-family dwellings, duplexes, and quadplexes.

It was listed in the National Register of Historic Places in 2012.
