= State Line Generating Plant =

Coal-fired power plant in Hammond, Indiana, US (1929–2012)

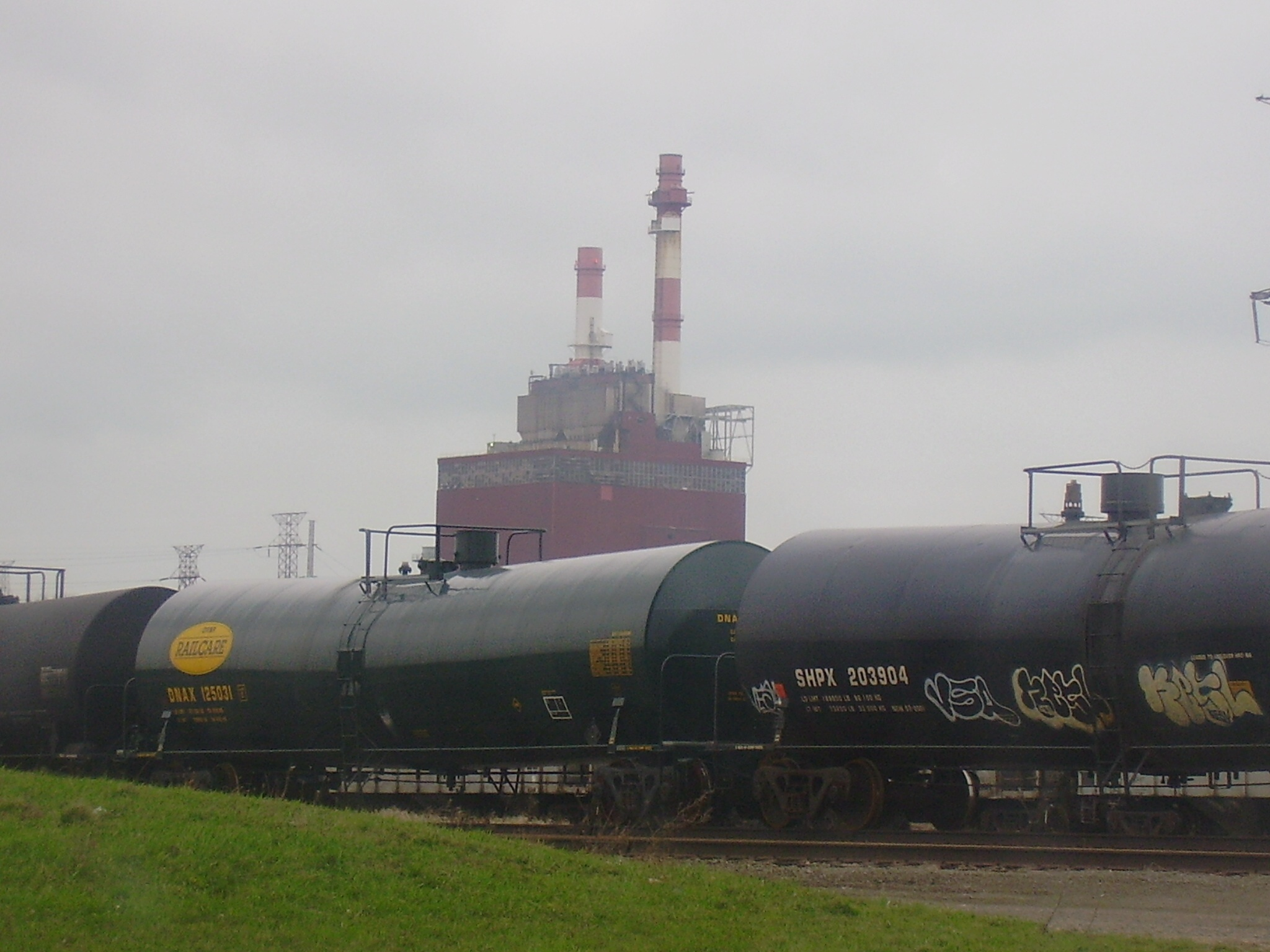
- State Line Generating Plant in 2006
- Country: United States
- Location: Hammond, Indiana
- Coordinates: 41°42′27″N 87°31′16″W
- Status: Decommissioned
- Commission date: 1929
- Decommission date: March 31, 2012
- Owner: BTU Solutions
- Operator: Chicago District Electric Generating Corporation

Thermal power station
- Primary fuel: Subbituminous coal
- Cooling source: Lake Michigan

Power generation
- Nameplate capacity: 614 MWe

External links
- Commons: Related media on Commons

The State Line Generating Plant was a coal-fired electrical generating station that operated from 1929 until 2012. It was located on the coast of Lake Michigan, bordering the state line separating Indiana from Illinois but within the corporate limits of Hammond, Indiana. In 2008–09, it had a year-round capacity of 515 megawatts.

Most of the plant's exterior and some of its interior infrastructure dated back to its original operation in 1929, making this plant one of the oldest large-scale urban electrical generating stations in the United States at the time it ceased operations. The plant's age meant that it generated more toxic waste, such as airborne mercury and nitrogen oxides, than most other U.S. generating plants.

Historically owned and operated by Commonwealth Edison, the State Line Generating Plant was later owned and operated by Dominion Resources. It was a National Historic Mechanical Engineering Landmark. The plant reached the end of its operating lifespan and was permanently shut down on March 31, 2012. Demolition was ongoing as of November 2014. The site has since been repurposed for a data center.

== History ==
=== Samuel Insull ===
The State Line Generating Plant was designed in Art Deco style by Graham, Anderson, Probst & White and built in 1926–1929 under the orders of industrial magnate Samuel Insull. Insull, who led a holding company that controlled Chicago's Commonwealth Edison electric utility, dedicated his working life to the implementation of economies of scale in the generation and supply of electricity.

During the 1920s, many residents of Chicago metropolitan area had signed up to receive electrical service for the first time. Generating plants throughout the metropolitan area had developed the capacity to produce 1,310 megawatts of power to serve 1,300,000 customer households. At the same time some expected demand for electricity to further increase. In particular, inhabitants of many rural areas throughout the United States, including rural areas adjacent to Chicago, did not yet have electrical service in 1929.

In addition to increased demand for electricity from households for purposes such as lighting and appliances, Insull expected substantial increases in demand for electricity from industrial-scale purchasers. In particular, Insull's holding companies also controlled the Chicago South Shore and South Bend, an electric railroad that ran near the site of the State Line Power Plant.

In order to fulfill the increased demand for electricity that Insull's engineers told him was expected and which he concurred was going to occur, the Insull holding companies constructed the State Line Power Plant and the Unit 1 generator within the plant. With a capacity of 208 megawatts, Unit 1 upon its operational date in 1929 was the largest turbine generator constructed up to that time. The turbine plant was built by General Electric at their plant in Schenectady, New York, and carried to Hammond for assembly. Its operation increased total Chicago-area electrical generation capacity by more than 15%, to 1,518 megawatts.

Insull's optimism was sufficient that he ordered that the State Line Power Plant be constructed on a scale sufficient to allow for the insertion of further turbines in the building. Commonwealth Edison's goal was to eventually insert enough capacity into State Line to generate more than 1,000 megawatts of power – which would have made the State Line Power Plant the world's first one-gigawatt plant.

The 1929 infrastructure projects of Insull's holding companies were financed with highly leveraged junk bonds. The Insull firms could not survive the shock of the Great Depression, and Insull and his investors suffered devastating financial losses. The State Line Power Plant had been professionally engineered and constructed, so continued to operate through the Depression, World War II, and into the postwar years.

=== Postwar years ===
Commonwealth Edison expanded the State Line Power Plant according to plan, with Unit 2 going into operation in 1938, Unit 3 in 1955, and Unit 4 in 1963.

As a result of various factors, including the advent of nuclear power and the passage of the Clean Air Act, by the late 20th and early 21st centuries the State Line Power Plant was entering the latter phase of its useful life. The historic Unit 1 turbine was taken out of service in 1978, followed by Unit 2 in 1979.

In 2011, the State Line Power Plant's two newer coal-fired units, historically Units 3 and 4 (but renamed as Units 1 and 2) continued to operate with a maximum capacity of 515 megawatts. The plant employed approximately 120 full-time employees in 2011, with employment dropping to 100 in January 2012 as the end of the plant's lifespan approached.

The State Line Power Plant's age meant that it was not fitted with many of the pollution control equipment that is mandated on more modern generating plants. Instead, State Line's operations were grandfathered, giving the plant the right to vent nitrogen oxides, airborne mercury, and sulphur dioxide into the air. According to a September 2010 article in the Chicago Tribune, the State Line Power Plant was described as one of the greatest single point-source contributors to the Chicago area's ongoing noncompliant status under the Clean Air Act.

In early May 2011, Dominion Resources informed Wall Street financial analysts that the firm did not plan to retrofit State Line with Clean Air Act pollution controls, and would instead shut the plant down in the three-year 2012–2014 period. The firm further announced in January 2012 that the planned shutdown of the 100-employee plant would take place on March 31, 2012. Upon completion of the March 31 shutdown, Dominion withdrew its remaining movable assets from the cold plant and handed it over to a demolition firm, BTU Solutions, on June 26, 2012. BTU Solutions pledged to demolish the plant over a two-year period, and demolition began in late 2012.

== See also ==
- List of power stations in Indiana
