= Hammond, Indiana =

- City
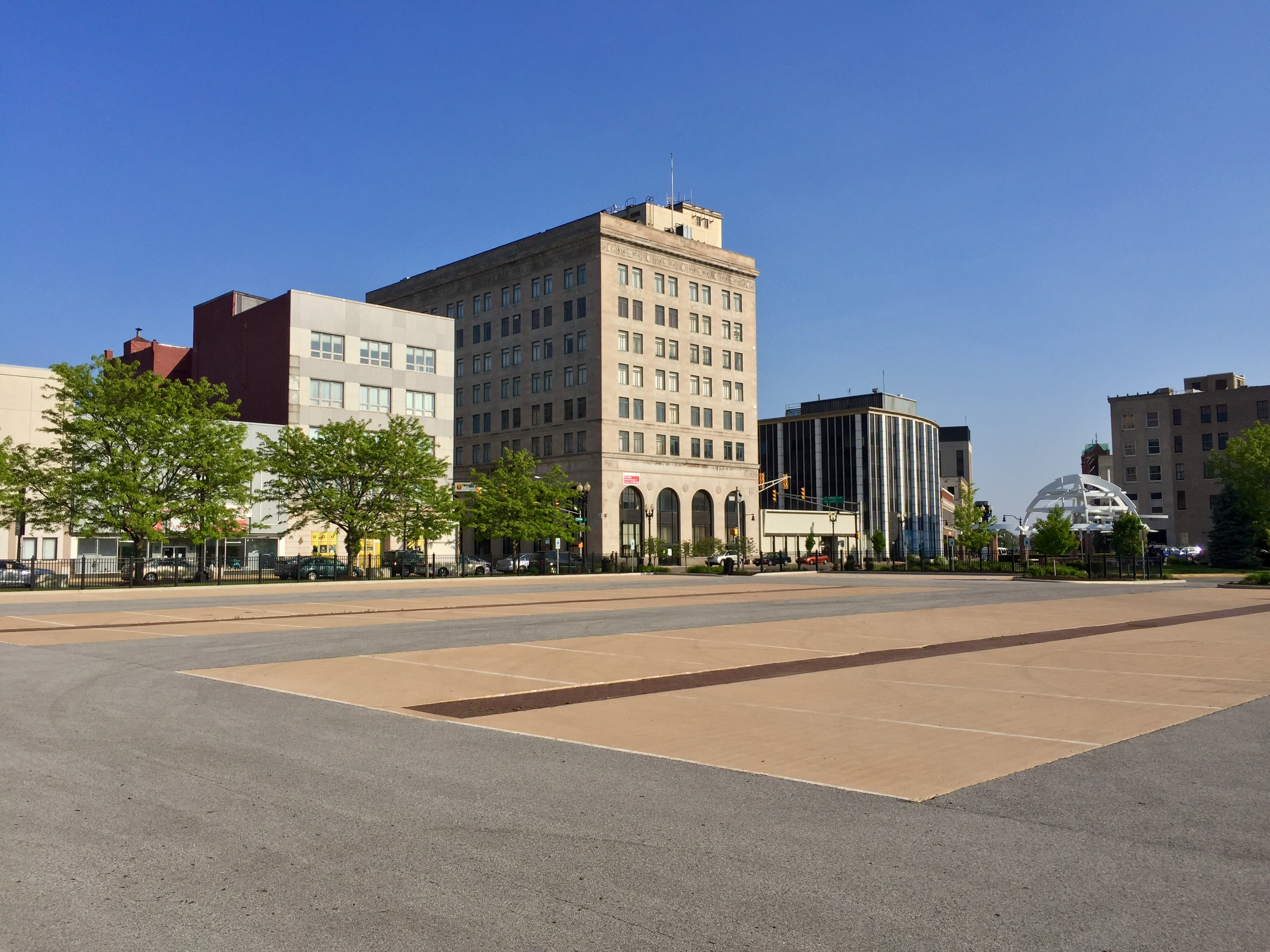
- Downtown Hammond

- Flag Seal
- Interactive map of Hammond, Indiana
- Location within Indiana Location within the United States
- Coordinates: 41°37′40″N 87°29′35″W
- Country: United States
- State: Indiana
- County: Lake
- Township: North
- Settled: 1847
- Founded: 1869
- Incorporated (town): December 4, 1883
- Incorporated (city): April 21, 1907
- Named for: George H. Hammond

Government
  - Type: Mayor–council
  - Mayor: Thomas McDermott Jr. (D)

Area
  - City: 23.827 sq mi (61.712 km^{2})
  - Land: 22.741 sq mi (58.898 km^{2})
  - Water: 1.086 sq mi (2.812 km^{2})
- Elevation: 584 ft (178 m)

Population (2020)
  - City: 77,879
  - Estimate (2023): 76,193
  - Rank: IN: 8th
  - Density: 3,350/sq mi (1,294/km^{2})
  - Urban: 8,671,746 (US: 3rd)
  - Metro: 9,262,825 (US: 14th)

Standard of living (2018–22)
  - Per capita income: $26,109
  - Median home value: $129,100
- Time zone: UTC−6 (Central (CST))
  - Summer (DST): UTC−5 (CDT)
- ZIP Codes: 46320, 46321, 46322, 46323, 46324, 46325, 46327
- Area code: 219
- FIPS code: 18-31000
- GNIS feature ID: 2394280
- Sales tax: 7.0%
- Website: gohammond.com

Hammond (/ˈhæmənd/ HAM-ənd) is a city in Lake County, Indiana, United States. Located along Lake Michigan, it is part of the Chicago metropolitan area and the only city in Indiana to border Chicago. As of the 2020 census, it is the eighth-most populous city in Indiana, with 77,879 residents. It was first settled in the mid-19th century and it is one of the oldest cities of northern Lake County.

From north to south, Hammond runs from Lake Michigan to the Little Calumet River; from east to west along its southern border, it runs from the Illinois state line to Cline Avenue. The city is traversed by numerous railroads and expressways, including the South Shore Line, Borman Expressway, and Indiana Toll Road. Notable local landmarks include the parkland around Wolf Lake and the Horseshoe Hammond riverboat casino. Part of the Rust Belt, Hammond has been industrial almost from its inception, but is also home to a campus of Purdue University and numerous historic districts.

== History ==
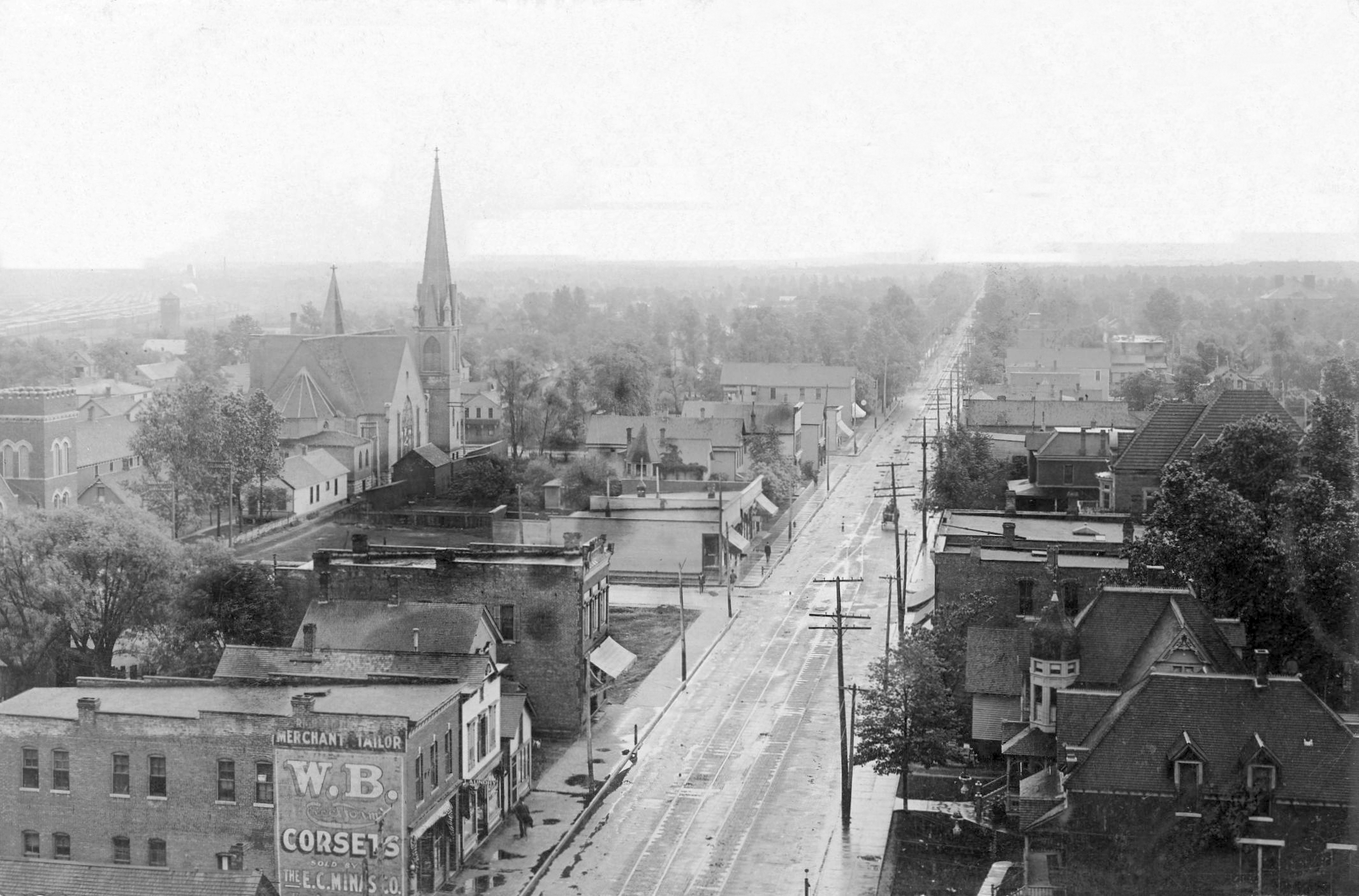
Hammond, circa 1908

The first European-descended residents arrived around 1847 to settle on land between the Grand and Little Calumet Rivers, on the south end of Lake Michigan. Those first residents were German immigrant farmers looking for land and opportunity. Before that time, the area was a crossroad for Indian tribes, explorers, stagecoach lines, and supply lines to the West. Convenient location and abundant fresh water from Lake Michigan led to the beginning of Hammond's industrialization in 1869 with the George H. Hammond Company meat-packing plant following merchants and farmers to the area. Hammond was incorporated on April 21, 1884, and was named after the Detroit butcher.

Hammond is one of the oldest cities in Lake County, with Crown Point being the oldest (established in 1834). According to the Encyclopedia of Chicago, George Henry Hammond, a pioneer in the use of refrigerated railcars for the transport of fresh meat, first used this method with his small packing company in Detroit, Michigan. In 1868, Hammond received a patent for a refrigerator car design. In the early 1870s, he built a new plant in northern Indiana along the tracks of the Michigan Central Railroad. By 1873, the George H. Hammond Co. was selling $1 million worth of meat a year; by 1875, sales were nearly $2 million. The company's large packing house in Hammond rivaled those located at the Union Stock Yard in Chicago. By the middle of the 1880s, when it built a new plant in Omaha, Nebraska, Hammond was slaughtering over 100,000 cattle a year and owned a fleet of 800 refrigerator cars. After Hammond died in 1886, the company became less important and no longer challenged the giant Chicago packers, which acquired Hammond at the turn of the century and merged it into their National Packing Co.

The Hammond Whiting and East Chicago Electric Railway Company trolley service ran from 1893 to 1940.

The Lake County Superior Court House mass shooting took place on December 4, 1916. A former U.S. Civil War cavalry veteran named Mike Inik shot three people, one of whom was Judge Greenwood. The motive for the attack was reportedly related to Inik attempting to force the company Standard Oil to pay him $4,000,000 in compensation after he was injured in an oil refinery accident. When the court dismissed his claim as outlandish, Inik allegedly spent nearly 20 years collecting revolvers and sabers from the U.S. military. He later carried out the attack with the intention of killing Judge Greenwood. After the shooting, Inik was apprehended by police and sent to Michigan State Prison. He eventually died there in 1945 and was reportedly buried in the prison's cemetery.

On June 22, 1918, the Hammond circus train wreck occurred about 5.5 miles (8.9 km) east of the city, killing 86 and injuring 127 persons.

The downtown Hammond shopping district along State Street and Hohman Avenue included major chains such as Sears and J. C. Penney. The largest stores in downtown were the Goldblatt's and E.C. Minas department stores. The E.C. Minas store was constructed in 1894 and was in business until August 1984. The building which housed the Goldblatt's store had been purchased by the Chicago-based retailer in 1931 and operated until 1982 when it closed due to bankruptcy.

The Pullman Standard Car Company built M4 Sherman tanks in Hammond during World War II.

Architect Victor Gruen designed the Woodmar Mall in the Woodmar neighborhood. The mall opened in 1954 and was anchored by a Carson Pirie Scott and Co. store.

According to the 1960 United States census Hammond's population reached a record high of 111,698 residents. Hammond, like other industrial cities in the Rust Belt, went into decline during the 1970s and 1980s, with the city's population plunging to 94,000 in 1980, and 83,000 in 2000. However, Hammond's economy was more diversified than neighboring Gary, Indiana, East Chicago, Indiana, and the south side of Chicago, which all relied on heavy industry (primarily steel production). Hammond's economy, though, depended on light manufacturing, transportation and warehousing, retail, banking and insurance, healthcare, hospitality and food service, and construction. In 1981, a toxic flood in Gary led Hammond to erect a barrier on 165th Street, one of several roads connecting the two cities, which led to lasting tensions with Gary.

Prominent manufacturing companies in Hammond include Unilever's soap factory, Atlas Tube, Cargill food processing, Munster Steel, Lear Seating Corporation, Jupiter Aluminum, Tri-State Automation, and Dover Chemical. Warehousing and storage is also prominent, with ExxonMobil and Marathon Petroleum having large oil-storage facilities, and FedEx has a distribution center. Large railroad marshalling yards are also present in the city, with the Indiana Harbor Belt Railroad's headquarters in the city. The State Line Generating Plant operated on the Indiana-Illinois state line from 1929 to 2012, and was demolished in 2014.

The Empress Casino opened in Hammond in June 1996 and was replaced with the Horseshoe Hammond casino in 2001.

In February 2006, the decision was made to demolish Woodmar Mall except for the Carson's store. The Hammond Redevelopment Commission announced plans in June 2016 for a $12 million sports complex to be built on the site of the former mall. The Carson's store closed in 2018, and was demolished in 2019, as part of its parent company's liquidation.

== Geography ==
The city sits within the boundaries of the former Lake Chicago, and much of its land area consists of former dune and swale terrain that was subsequently leveled. Most of the city is on sandy soil with a layer of black topsoil that varies from non-existent to several feet (a meter or more) thick. Much of the exposed sand was removed for purposes such as industrial use to make concrete and glass.

According to the United States Census Bureau, the city has a total area of 23.827 sq mi (61.71 km^{2}), of which 1.086 sq mi (2.81 km^{2}) is covered by water.

=== Neighborhoods ===
- Robertsdale
- North Hammond
- Central Hammond
- South Hammond
- Woodmar
- Schleicher
- Hessville

=== Lakes and rivers ===
- Grand Calumet River (partial)
- Lake George
- Lake Michigan (partial)
- Little Calumet River (partial)
- Oxbow Lake
- Wolf Lake (partial)

=== Adjacent cities, towns, and villages ===
==== Illinois ====
- Chicago
- Burnham
- Calumet City
- Lansing

==== Indiana ====
- Gary
- East Chicago
- Highland
- Munster
- Whiting

== Demographics ==
Historical population
| Census | Pop. | Note | %± |
|---|---|---|---|
| 1880 | 699 | | — |
| 1890 | 5,284 | | 655.9% |
| 1900 | 12,376 | | 134.2% |
| 1910 | 20,925 | | 69.1% |
| 1920 | 36,004 | | 72.1% |
| 1930 | 65,559 | | 82.1% |
| 1940 | 70,183 | | 7.1% |
| 1950 | 87,595 | | 24.8% |
| 1960 | 111,698 | | 27.5% |
| 1970 | 107,983 | | −3.3% |
| 1980 | 91,985 | | −14.8% |
| 1990 | 84,236 | | −8.4% |
| 2000 | 83,048 | | −1.4% |
| 2010 | 80,830 | | −2.7% |
| 2020 | 77,879 | | −3.7% |
| 2025 (est.) | 75,712 | | −2.8% |
U.S. Decennial Census; 2020 Census

=== Racial and ethnic composition ===
Hammond city, Indiana – Racial and ethnic composition Note: the US Census treats Hispanic/Latino as an ethnic category. This table excludes Latinos from the racial categories and assigns them to a separate category. Hispanics/Latinos may be of any race.
| Race / Ethnicity (NH = Non-Hispanic) | Pop 2000 | Pop 2010 | Pop 2020 | % 2000 | % 2010 | % 2020 |
|---|---|---|---|---|---|---|
| White alone (NH) | 51,822 | 33,534 | 23,674 | 62.40% | 41.49% | 30.40% |
| Black or African American alone (NH) | 11,876 | 17,568 | 19,584 | 14.30% | 21.73% | 25.15% |
| Native American or Alaska Native alone (NH) | 160 | 145 | 112 | 0.19% | 0.18% | 0.14% |
| Asian alone (NH) | 357 | 753 | 611 | 0.43% | 0.93% | 0.78% |
| Native Hawaiian or Pacific Islander alone (NH) | 36 | 9 | 21 | 0.04% | 0.01% | 0.03% |
| Other race alone (NH) | 89 | 90 | 287 | 0.11% | 0.11% | 0.37% |
| Mixed race or Multiracial (NH) | 1,235 | 1,168 | 2,248 | 1.49% | 1.45% | 2.89% |
| Hispanic or Latino (any race) | 17,473 | 27,563 | 31,342 | 21.04% | 34.10% | 40.24% |
| Total | 83,048 | 80,830 | 77,879 | 100.00% | 100.00% | 100.00% |

=== 2020 census ===
As of the 2020 census, there were 77,879 people residing in the city; the population density was 3,426.4/sq mi (1,322.9/km^{2}). The median age was 35.6 years. 25.4% of residents were under the age of 18, 5.3% were under 5 years of age, and 13.0% were 65 years of age or older. For every 100 females there were 96.1 males, and for every 100 females age 18 and over there were 93.8 males age 18 and over.

There were 29,486 households, of which 33.2% had children under the age of 18 living in them. Of all households, 33.3% were married-couple households, 24.7% were households with a male householder and no spouse or partner present, and 34.2% were households with a female householder and no spouse or partner present. About 31.1% of all households were made up of individuals and 10.8% had someone living alone who was 65 years of age or older. Of the total households, 18,580 were families.

There were 31,822 housing units, of which 7.3% were vacant. The homeowner vacancy rate was 1.7% and the rental vacancy rate was 6.8%.

100.0% of residents lived in urban areas, while 0.0% lived in rural areas.

Racial composition as of the 2020 census
| Race | Number | Percent |
|---|---|---|
| White | 30,503 | 39.2% |
| Black or African American | 20,264 | 26.0% |
| American Indian and Alaska Native | 969 | 1.2% |
| Asian | 646 | 0.8% |
| Native Hawaiian and Other Pacific Islander | 30 | 0.0% |
| Some other race | 14,397 | 18.5% |
| Two or more races | 11,070 | 14.2% |
| Hispanic or Latino (of any race) | 31,342 | 40.2% |

=== 2010 census ===
As of the 2010 census, there were 80,830 people, 29,949 households, and 19,222 families residing in the city. The population density was 3,549.0 inhabitants per square mile (1,370.3/km^{2}). There were 32,945 housing units at an average density of 1,446.2 per square mile (558.4/km^{2}). The racial makeup of the city was 59.4% White, 22.5% African American, 0.5% Native American, 1.0% Asian, 13.3% from other races, and 3.3% from two or more races. Hispanic or Latino of any race were 34.1% of the population.

There were 29,949 households, of which 36.2% had children under the age of 18 living with them, 37.0% were married couples living together, 19.7% had a female householder with no husband present, 7.5% had a male householder with no wife present, and 35.8% were non-families. 30.3% of all households were made up of individuals, and 9.7% had someone living alone who was 65 years of age or older. The average household size was 2.67 and the average family size was 3.36.

The median age in the city was 33.3 years. 27.6% of residents were under the age of 18; 10.1% were between the ages of 18 and 24; 27.3% were from 25 to 44; 24.2% were from 45 to 64; and 10.7% were 65 years of age or older. The gender makeup of the city was 49.0% male and 51.0% female.

=== 2000 census ===
As of the 2000 census, there were 83,048 people, 32,026 households and 20,880 families residing in the city. The population density was 3,630.0 inhabitants per square mile (1,401.6/km^{2}). There were 34,139 housing units at an average density of 1,492.2 per square mile (576.1/km^{2}). The racial makeup of the city was 72.35% White, 14.57% African American, 0.41% Native American, 0.46% Asian, 0.08% Pacific Islander, 9.32% from other races, and 2.81% from two or more races. Hispanic or Latino of any race were 21.04% of the population.

There were 32,026 households, out of which 31.8% had children under the age of 18 living with them, 42.9% were married couples living together, 16.9% had a female householder with no husband present, and 34.8% were non-families. 29.7% of all households were made up of individuals, and 10.9% had someone living alone who was 65 years of age or older. The average household size was 2.58 and the average family size was 3.23.

In the city, the population was spread out, with 27.3% under the age of 18, 9.8% from 18 to 24, 30.1% from 25 to 44, 19.8% from 45 to 64, and 13.0% who were 65 years of age or older. The median age was 34 years. For every 100 females, there were 95.3 males. For every 100 females age 18 and over, there were 92.2 males.

The median income for a household in the city was $35,528, and the median income for a family was $42,221. Males had a median income of $35,778 versus $25,180 for females. The per capita income for the city was $16,254. About 12.0% of families and 14.3% of the population were below the poverty line, including 19.7% of those under age 18 and 9.3% of those age 65 or over.

== Economy ==
=== Major employers ===
According to the city, those businesses employing 200 or more employees in Hammond are:

| # | Employer | # of employees |
|---|---|---|
| 1 | Franciscan Health Hammond | 2,500 |
| 2 | School City of Hammond | 2,485 |
| 3 | Horseshoe Casino | 1,866 |
| 4 | City of Hammond | 875 |
| 5 | Walmart | 785 |
| 6 | Indiana Harbor Belt Railroad | 759 |
| 7 | Lear Seating Corporation | 615 |
| 8 | Contract Services Group | 300 |
| 9 | Unilever | 255 |
| 10 | Morrison Construction Company | 250 |
| 11 | Cargill | 240 |

== Arts and culture ==
=== National Register of Historic Places ===
The following single properties and national historic districts are listed on the National Register of Historic Places:

- Morse Dell Plain House and Garden
- Forest-Ivanhoe Residential Historic District
- Forest-Moraine Residential Historic District
- Forest-Southview Residential Historic District
- Glendale Park Historic District
- Hohman Avenue Commercial Historic District
- Indi-Illi Park Historic District
- Northern States Life Insurance Company
- Pullman-Standard Historic District
- Roselawn-Forest Heights Historic District
- Southmoor Apartment Hotel
- State Bank of Hammond Building
- State Street Commercial Historic District
- George John Wolf House

=== Public libraries ===
Hammond Public Library, located at 564 State Street, includes the Suzanne G. Long Local History Room. The system used to operate the E.B. Hayward Branch at 1212 172nd Street and the Howard Branch at 7047 Grand Avenue. Both branches have since been closed. The Hammond Public Library was the first library in the state to form a recognized union, a local of AFSCME. Patricia E. Robinson was the first president of the library union.

== Sports ==
Hammond was defeated by the team from Taipei, Taiwan in the 1972 Little League World Series.

- Past teams
  - Hammond Rollers, an American Basketball Association team founded in 2006, was sold to the owner of the Quad City Riverhawks the same year. The team relocated and became the Sauk Valley Rollers of Rock Falls, Illinois.
  - Hammond Ciesar All-Americans (1938–41) and Hammond Calumet Buccaneers (1948–49), were professional basketball teams in the National Basketball League. Baseball Hall of Famer Lou Boudreau and UCLA basketball coach John Wooden both played for the Ciesar All-Americans.

=== The Hammond Pros (1920–1924) ===
The Hammond Pros was one of the earliest professional football teams in the United States. When the American Professional Football Association was formed in 1920, the Hammond Pros was a charter member, as it also was when the league changed its name to National Football League in 1922. However, four years later, when the NFL decided to reduce the number of teams, it did so by simply folding smaller franchises. The Hammond Pros never played a home game in Hammond.

During the four years of the Hammond Pros' existence, the NFL had nine African-American players, six of whom played for the Pros. The NFL's first African-American head coach was Hall-of-Famer coach Fritz Pollard of the Pros.

=== Chicago Bears ===
On June 5, 2026, the Chicago Bears Board of Directors announced that they had voted to advance plans to construct a stadium in Hammond, with its exact location yet to be determined. The announcement came after the Illinois General Assembly declined to vote on a financing proposal aimed at keeping the Bears in Illinois.

== Government ==
Hammond is incorporated as a city under Indiana law. It therefore has a mayor and a nine-member city council. Hammond's City Hall is located at 5925 Calumet Avenue. The Hammond City Council has meetings scheduled for the second and fourth Mondays of each month.

The city maintains a city court on the second floor of the City Hall, exercising a limited jurisdiction within Lake County. The court handles not only local ordinance violations and certain minor criminal matters, but also a significant portion of the debt collection and eviction actions brought in Lake County.

=== City Council ===
- Janet Venecz (D, At Large), President
- Katrina D. Alexander (D, At Large)
- Daniel P. "Dan" Spitale (D, At Large)
- Mark Kalwinski (D, 1st)
- Alfonso "Al" Salinas III (D, 2nd)
- Barry Tyler, Jr. (D, 3rd)
- William "Bill" Emerson, Sr. (D, 4th)
- David "Dave" Woerpel (D, 5th)
- Scott Rakos (D, 6th—Council president in 2023–2024)

=== List of mayors ===
| # | Name | Term | Party |
|---|---|---|---|
| 1 | Marcus Towle | 1884–1888 | Republican |
| 2 | Thomas Hammond | 1888–1893 | Democratic |
| 3 | Patrick Reilly | 1893–1894 | Democratic |
| 4 | Fred R. Mott | 1894–1898 | Republican |
| 5 | Patrick Reilly | 1898–1902 | Democratic |
| 6 | Armanis F. Knotts | 1902–1904 | Republican |
| 7 | Lawrence Becker | 1904–1911 | Democratic |
| 8 | John D. Smalley | 1911–1918 | Democratic |
| 9 | Daniel Brown | 1918–1925 | Republican |
| 10 | Adrian E. Tinkham | 1925–1930 | Republican |
| 11 | Charles O. Schonert | 1930–1935 | Republican |
| 12 | Frank Martin | 1935–1942 | Democratic |
| 13 | G. Bertram Smith | 1942–1948 | Democratic |
| 14 | Vernon C. Anderson | 1948–1956 | Republican |
| 15 | Edward Dowling | 1956–1968 | Democratic |
| 16 | Joseph Klen | 1968–1976 | Democratic |
| 17 | Edward J. Raskosky | 1976–1984 | Democratic |
| 18 | Thomas M. McDermott, Sr. | 1984–1992 | Republican |
| 19 | Duane Dedelow, Jr. | 1992–2004 | Republican |
| 20 | Thomas M. McDermott, Jr. | 2004–present | Democratic |

== Education ==
=== School City of Hammond ===
All of Hammond is served by the School City of Hammond, a school corporation under Indiana state law that is independent of the civil city. It includes 11 elementary schools, two middle schools, and two high schools: Hammond Central High School, and Morton High School. Former high schools included George Rogers Clark High School and Gavit High School.

=== Privately owned and operated schools ===
- Bishop Noll Institute (high school)
- City Baptist High School
- Hazel Young Academy
- Montessori Children's Schoolhouse
- St. Casimir (elementary school)
- St. John Bosco (elementary school)
- St. John the Baptist (elementary school)

Catholic schools are under the Roman Catholic Diocese of Gary.

St. Catherine of Siena, a Catholic elementary school, opened prior to 1959. Prior to 2009 its enrollment had declined, with 130 students that year, and its financial state had deteriorated. The school closed in 2009.

=== Colleges and universities ===
- Calumet College of St. Joseph
- Kaplan University
- Purdue University Northwest

== Infrastructure ==
=== Transportation ===
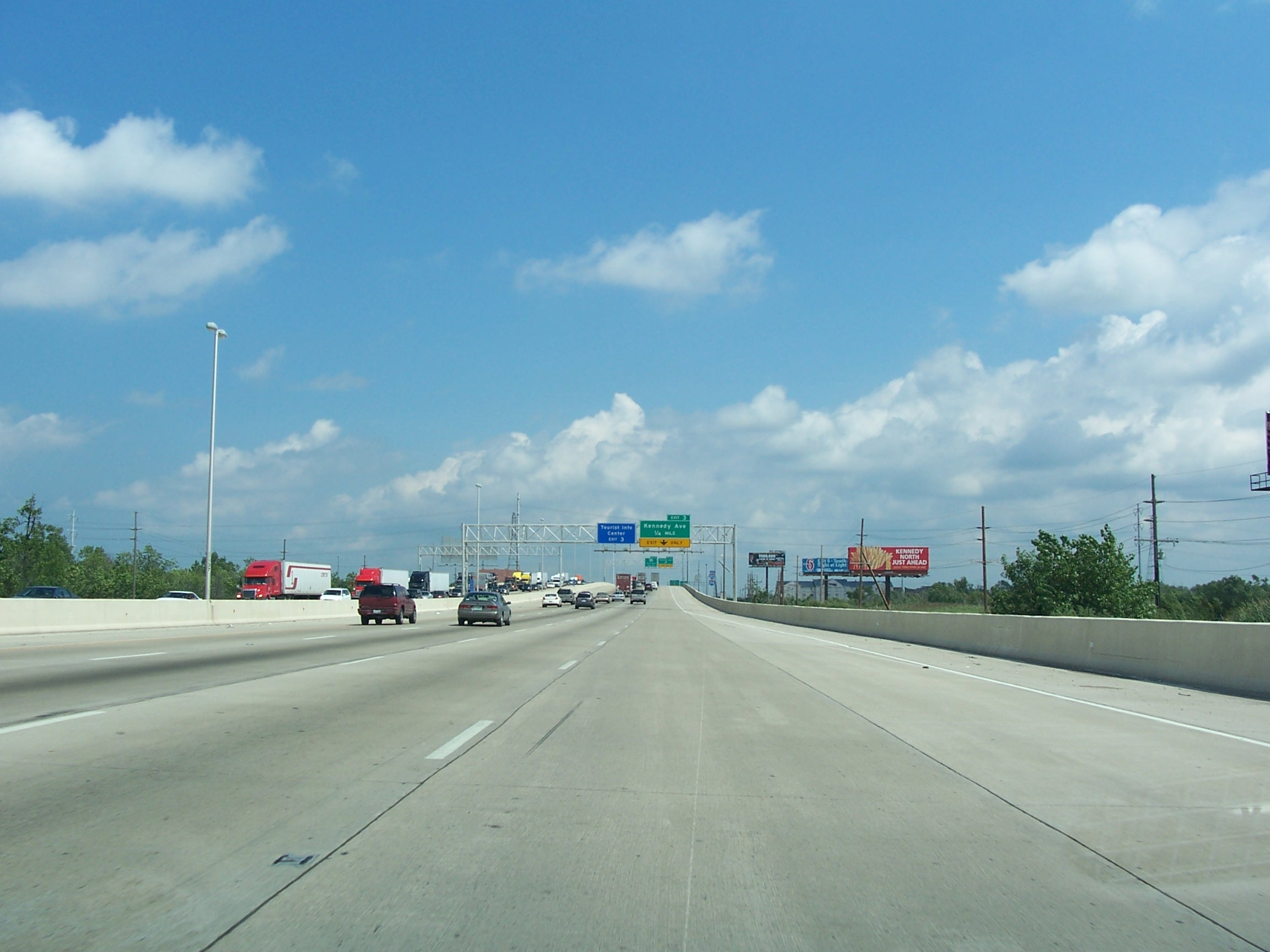
Borman Expressway

Most of Hammond's streets are laid out in a grid pattern similar to Chicago's streets. While Madison Street in Chicago acts as the reference point for north–south street numbering the first "1" is removed; this makes what would be a five digit address number in Illinois into a four digit address number in Hammond. The state line is used as the reference point for east–west street numbering.

Other cities and towns in Northwest Indiana that use the Hammond numbering system are Whiting, Munster and Highland. Dyer also uses the Hammond numbering system but the first number removed from the north–south streets is a "2," as by that point the Illinois numbers across the state line start with the number 2 (Munster's street numbers start with a "1" north of the Dyer line, making them 5 digits); and East Chicago uses the canal located in the middle of the city as the east–west reference point, while embodying Hammond's numbering system for the north–south streets.

- I-90 – Indiana Toll Road, exits (listed northwest to southeast):

- Indianapolis Boulevard – U.S. 12/20/41
- Calumet Avenue – U.S. 41
- Cline Avenue – State Road 912

- I-80/94 – Borman Expressway, exits (listed west to east):

- Calumet Avenue – U.S. 41 North
- Indianapolis Boulevard – U.S. 41 South/State Road 152
- Kennedy Avenue
- Cline Avenue – State Road 912

==== Public transportation ====
The South Shore Line, a Chicago to South Bend, Indiana commuter rail line operated by the Northern Indiana Commuter Transportation District, has stops at Hammond Gateway station (on the Lakeshore Corridor) and South Hammond station (on the Monon Corridor).

Amtrak, the national passenger rail system, provides twice-daily service in both directions, operating its Wolverine through the Hammond-Whiting station between Chicago and Pontiac, Michigan, just north of Detroit.

The nearest commercial airport is Chicago Midway International Airport about 25 miles away in Chicago.

Bus transit was provided by the Northwest Indiana Regional Bus Authority, which assumed responsibility from the city's Hammond Transit System in 2010, establishing EasyGo Lake Transit system in its place. All EasyGo buses were discontinued on June 30, 2012, due to a lack of funding. In addition, Pace routes 350 and 364 and GPTC Tri-City Connection Route 12 from Gary, Indiana stop at Hammond's Dan Rabin Transit Plaza.

=== Medical centers and hospitals ===
The only hospital in Hammond was Franciscan St. Margaret Health on Stateline Road, across the street from Calumet City, Illinois. It is an accredited chest pain center serving Northwest Indiana and the south suburbs of Chicago. The hospital was founded in late 1898 and was originally called St. Margaret Hospital, later merging with Our Lady Of Mercy Hospital in Dyer, Indiana, in the 1990s and was part of the former Sisters of St. Francis Health Services. The hospital closed in December 2022.

=== Utilities ===
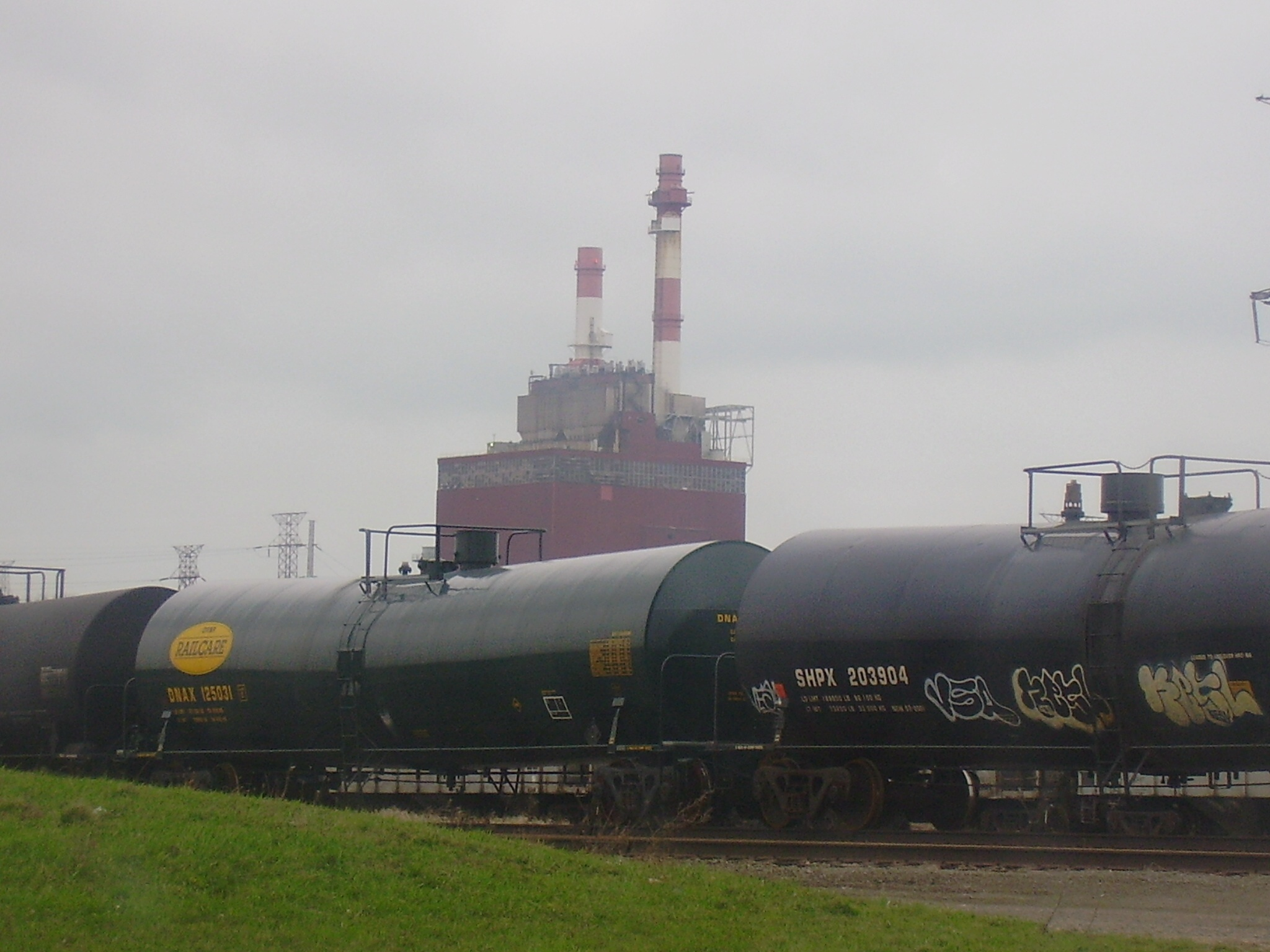
Former State Line Generating Plant in Robertsdale

- Electricity and Natural gas – Nearly all of the electricity and natural gas used in Hammond is produced by NIPSCO, a NiSource company.
- Water – Water service for nearly all consumers of water in the city is provided by the Hammond Water Department, a state-owned utility that is operated by the civil city government.

== Sister city ==
- Galați, Romania (since 1997)

== See also ==
- Hammond Indiana Barrier Controversy
- 1916 Hammond superior court house shooting
