= Central Hammond =

- Neighborhood
- Interactive map of Central Hammond
- Coordinates: 41°37′02″N 87°31′26″W
- Country: United States
- State: Indiana
- County: Lake County
- City: Hammond
- Time zone: UTC-6 (CST)
  - Summer (DST): UTC-5 (CDT)
- ZIP code: 46320
- Area code: 219

Central Hammond is a neighborhood in western Hammond, Indiana, approximately between the Illinois state line and White Oak Avenue, north of 165th Street. It is bounded to the south by South Hammond and Woodmar, to the west by Calumet City, Illinois, to the north by North Hammond, and to the east by the East Chicago neighborhoods of Roxana and Southside. The sinuous Grand Calumet River marks the neighborhood's northern boundary. The neighborhood's boundaries correspond to Hammond's Planning District III.

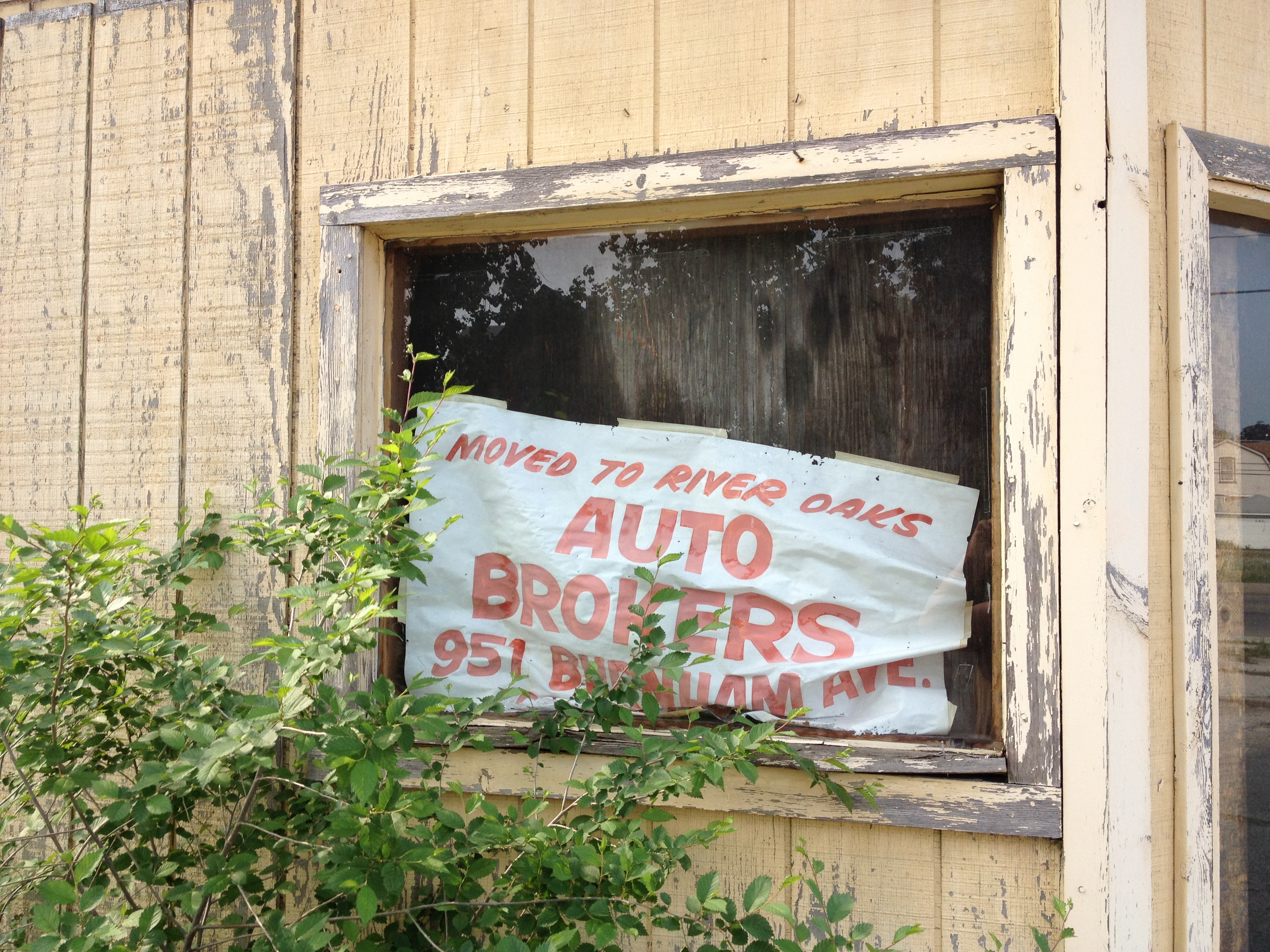
A storefront in Central Hammond

Central Hammond is made up of a patchwork of residential, commercial and institutional land uses. The neighborhood includes Hammond's historic downtown, home of the State Street Commercial Historic District and Hohman Avenue Commercial Historic District, as well as the Hammond federal courthouse for the United States District Court for the Northern District of Indiana. Beyond the downtown, the neighborhood is also contains the Forest–Moraine Residential Historic District in its southwestern corner.
