= Northside (East Chicago) =

- Neighborhood
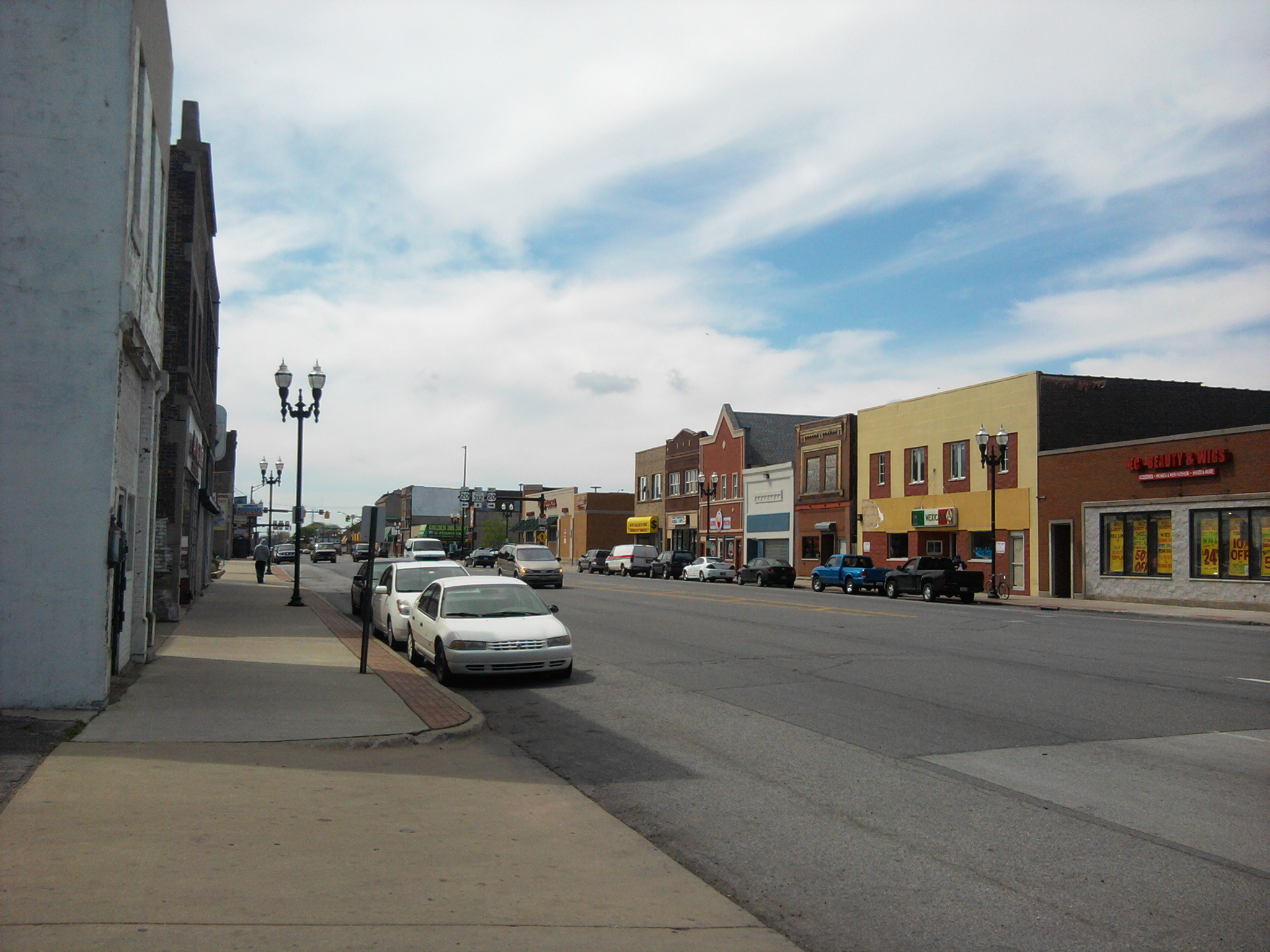
- Chicago Avenue
- Interactive map of Northside
- Coordinates: 41°38′N 87°29′W
- Country: United States
- State: Indiana
- County: Lake County
- City: East Chicago

Area
  - Total: 0.87 km^{2} (0.34 sq mi)

Population (2013)
  - Total: 4,434
  - Density: 5,100/km^{2} (13,000/sq mi)
- Time zone: UTC-6 (CST)
  - Summer (DST): UTC-5 (CDT)
- ZIP code: 46312
- Area code: 219

Northside or North Side is a neighborhood in western East Chicago, Indiana. Together with Southside and Roxana, it makes up "East Chicago proper," as distinct from Indiana Harbor. The neighborhood has one of the highest rates of owner-occupied homes in the city. Notable landmarks in Northside include the East Chicago City Hall and Central High School.

Northside is bounded on the north by Columbus Drive (United States Route 12) and on the south by the commercial corridor along Chicago Avenue (Indiana State Road 312). To the east, the residential area is bounded by Indianapolis Boulevard; beyond that lies the industrial district along the Indiana Harbor and Ship Canal. To the west, Northside adjoins North Hammond. To the north, it is bounded by the Lake George branch of the Canal; beyond that lies a vast industrial district that includes the Whiting Refinery and the East Chicago Confined Disposal Facility.

Prior to the 20th century, Northside was a wooded dune and swale area, which saw little settlement during the first years of East Chicago's existence. The neighborhood's first settler was reputedly an agent for the East Chicago Company named John Brennell. In the early twentieth century, Northside became the preferred destination for wealthier, native-born Americans, in contrast to the poorer immigrant residents in other parts of East Chicago. In 1910, 75% of the neighborhood's heads of household were born in the United States, while the remainder largely hailed from England or Wales.

The neighborhood was chosen by local elites because it "stood far enough from industry to escape the worst of the noise and pollution," but was still within walking distance of the commercial and industrial centers. The pattern was reinforced by restricted housing developments that promised to sell to "Americans only".

The neighborhood attempted to preserve its exclusive status in 1944 by opposing construction of the Sinclair Oil tank farm at the neighborhood's north end, on the south bank of the Ship Canal. Although successful in the local government, the refinery opponents were ultimately defeated in the state courts.

== Works cited ==
- Tamsen Song Anderson (2009). Negotiating Life at the Urban Periphery: The Development of the Industrial Suburb of East Chicago, Indiana, 1850-1950 (Ph.D. thesis).
