= Brunswick (Gary, Indiana) =

- Neighborhood
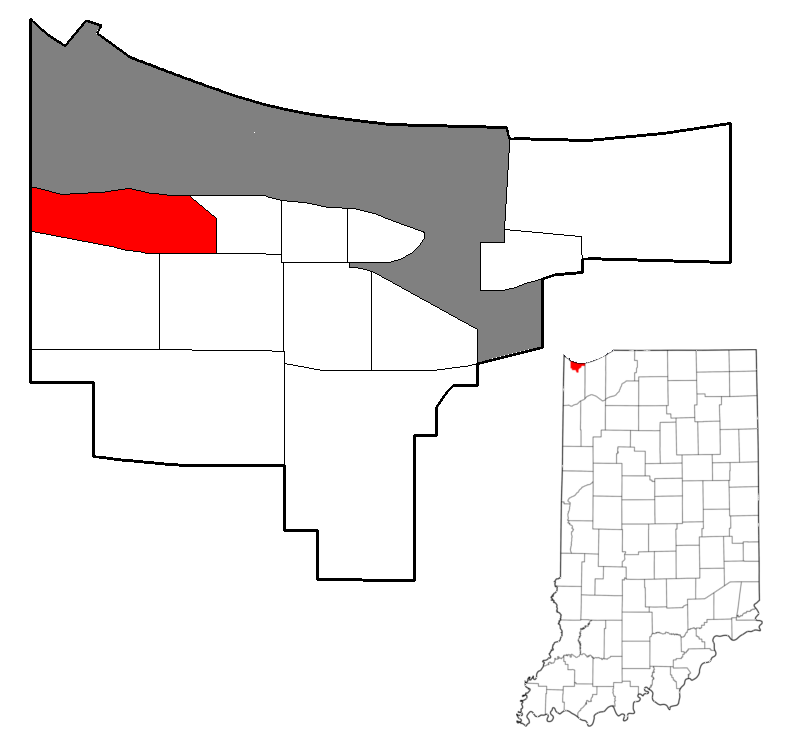
- Location within the city of Gary
- Coordinates: 41.602158°N 87.403293°W
- Country: United States
- State: Indiana
- County: Lake County
- City: Gary

Population (2000)
  - Total: 4,442
- Time zone: UTC-6 (CST)
  - Summer (DST): UTC-5 (CDT)
- ZIP code: 46406
- Area code: 219

Brunswick is a neighborhood in northwestern Gary, Indiana, just south of Gary Chicago Airport. It borders Hammond and East Chicago to the west, and the Gary neighborhoods of Ambridge Mann to the east and Westside to the south. The borders are defined by the Indiana Toll Road on the north, Chase Street on the east, the Norfolk Southern railway on the south and Cline Avenue on the west. As of 2000, Brunswick had a population of 4,442 people, which was 84.6% African-American and 7.7% white. Like many Gary neighborhoods, Brunswick was a segregated white community until the early 1970s, when massive white flight occurred.

As of 2000, the neighborhood's housing stock had a 90% occupancy rate and a 68% owner-occupancy rate. It was dominated by single-family homes, with 10% consisting of multi-family dwellings. The neighborhood is the site of a major shopping plaza, with additional commercial development clustered along U.S. 20. There are two private elementary schools, West Gary Lighthouse and Aspire Charter Academy, and one public elementary school, Brunswick Elementary.

Brunswick was formerly served by its own post office. However, the Brunswick Station post office was closed in February 2011, and its operations were merged into those of the post office in Tolleston. Brunswick is served by its own branch of the Gary Public Library, which was established in 1959 but only moved into a dedicated space in 2003.

Transportation connections in Brunswick include rail, highway, and air. The Gary/Chicago International Airport is located directly north of the neighborhood, and the neighborhood is served by the Clark Road station on the South Shore Line. The Cline Avenue expressway runs just west of Brunswick, and also affords access to the Indiana Toll Road which runs north of the neighborhood. At surface level, the neighborhood is traversed by U.S. 20, and is served by the buses of the Gary Public Transportation Corporation.

Remnant areas of dune and swale habitat exist in Brunswick. Examples include the 110-acre Ivanhoe nature preserve operated by the Nature Conservancy, and the Clark and Pine Nature Preserve operated by the Indiana Department of Natural Resources, which has the highest concentration of rare and endangered species of any Indiana nature preserve. The neighborhood is home to a 49-acre city park, Brunswick Park, which also incorporates areas of remnant dune and swale.

The sewage treatment plant of the Gary Sanitary District is located in Brunswick, near the Grand Calumet River.
