= South Hammond =

- Neighborhood
- Interactive map of South Hammond
- Coordinates: 41°35′06″N 87°31′26″W
- Country: United States
- State: Indiana
- County: Lake County
- City: Hammond
- Time zone: UTC-6 (CST)
  - Summer (DST): UTC-5 (CDT)
- ZIP code: 46324
- Area code: 219

South Hammond is a neighborhood in southwestern Hammond, Indiana, approximately between the Illinois state line and Columbia Avenue, south of 165th Street. It is bounded to the east by Woodmar, to the south by the towns of Munster and Highland, to the west by Calumet City, Illinois, and to the north by Central Hammond. The Little Calumet River snakes along the neighborhood's southern boundary. The neighborhood's boundaries correspond to Hammond's Planning District IV.

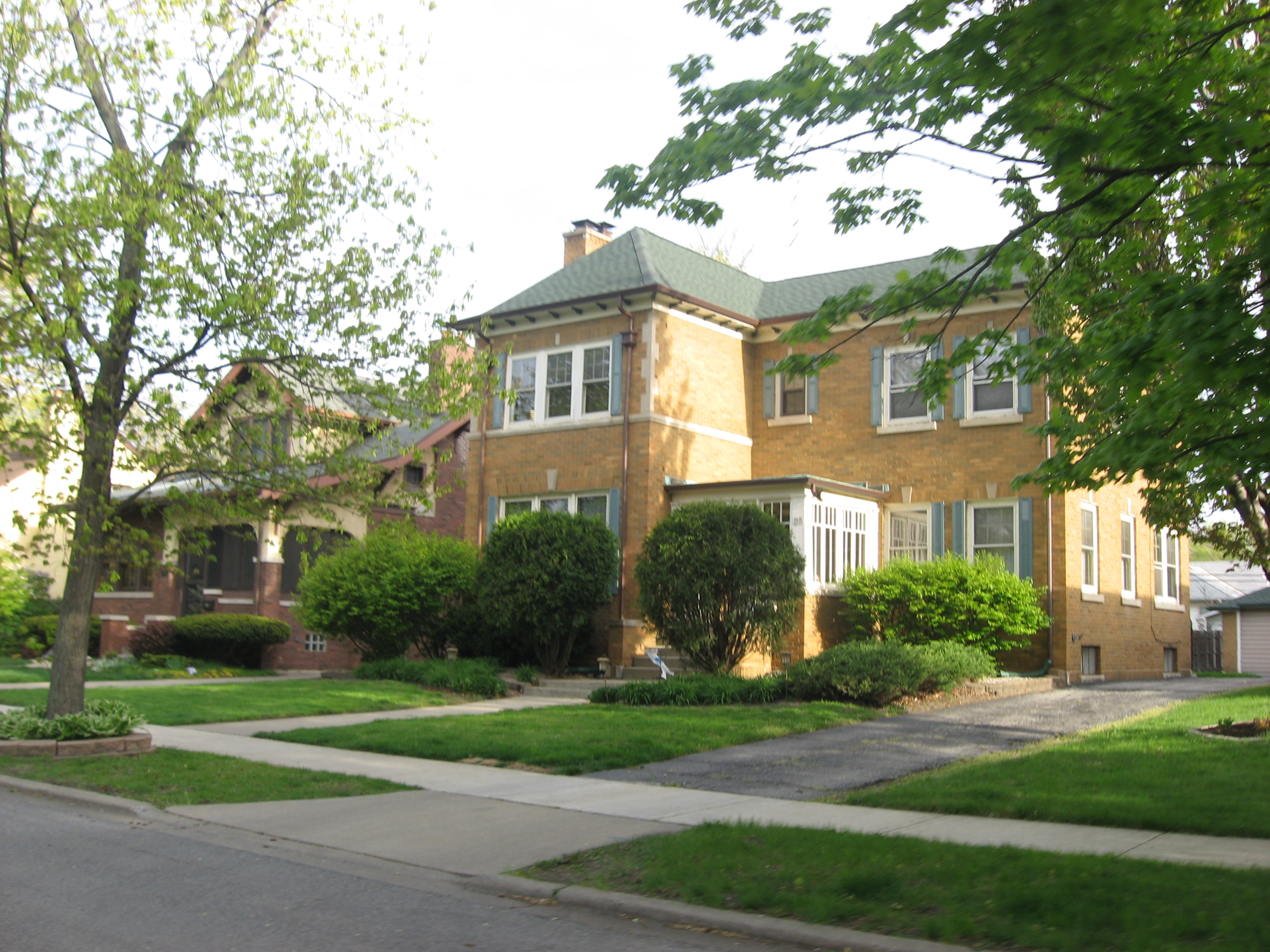
Home in the Indi-Illi Park Historic District in South Hammond.

With the exception of a commercial strip along Calumet Avenue, South Hammond is overwhelmingly residential. Many of these residences are historic: South Hammond is home to the Indi-Illi Park Historic District, Roselawn–Forest Heights Historic District and Forest–Ivanhoe Residential Historic District.
