= Edmund Kayser =

German-American Lutheran pastor

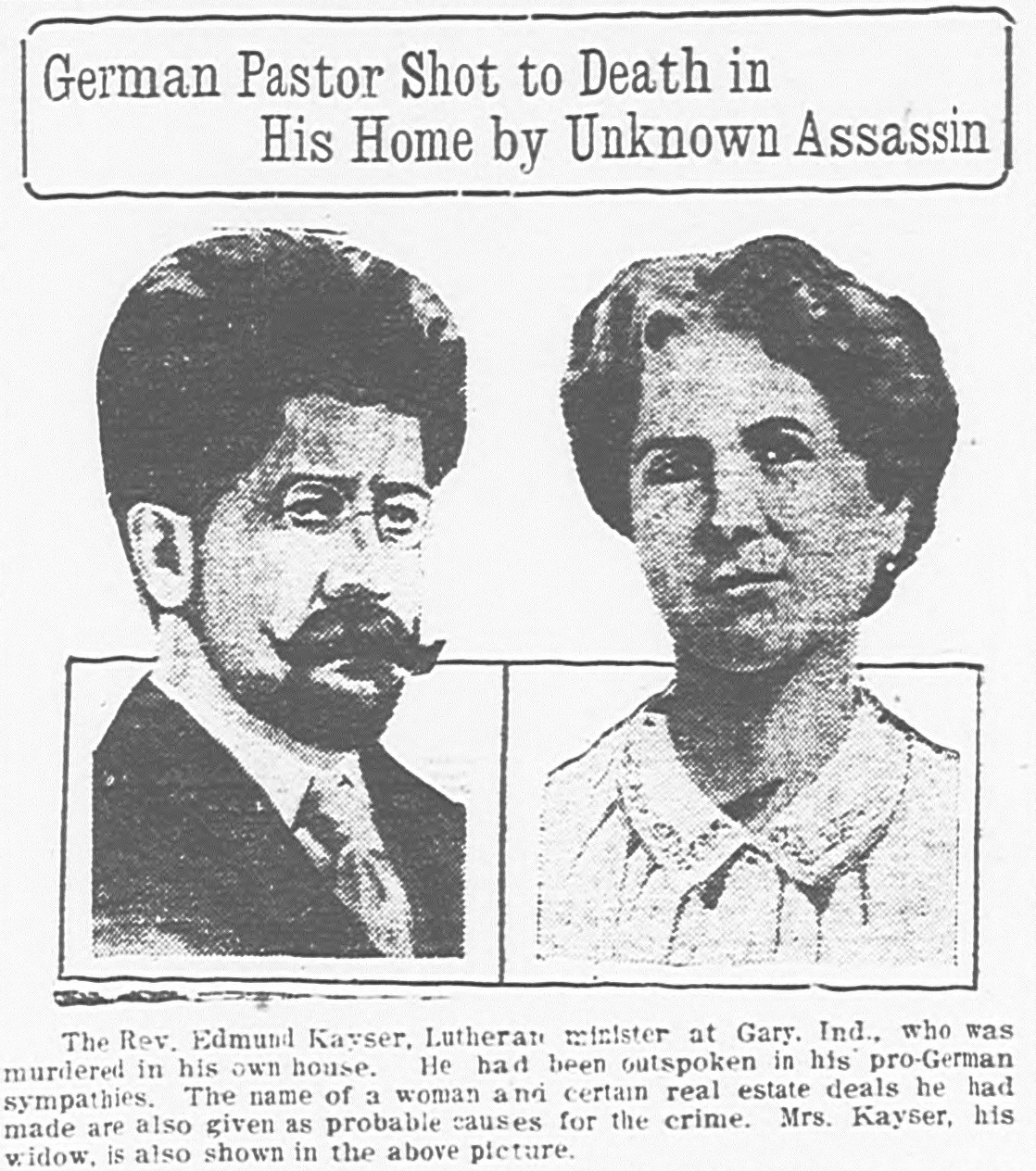
- German Pastor Shot to Death in His Home by Unknown Assassin
- Born: Edmund H. A. Kayser; 1875; Bavaria, Imperial Germany
- Died: August 25, 1916 (40-years-old); Tolleston, Indiana
- Occupation: Pastor

Edmund Kayser (1875 – 25 August 1916) was the pastor of St. James' Evangelical Lutheran Church in Tolleston, Indiana, who was assassinated on August 25, 1916, for his pro-German views during World War I.

== Background ==
World War I had started on July 28, 1914, when the Austro-Hungarian Empire declared war on Serbia. By 1916, nearly all of the European nations and empires had entered the war. The United States maintained its neutrality, and some of its sizeable German population supported Imperial Germany and the Central Powers. In the 1910 census there were 2.3 million German-born immigrants living in the United States and 550 German newspapers in the country. The large number of German-Americans was also a factor in keeping the U.S. out of World War I until the fighting had been going on for three years.

== Early life ==
Edmund Kayser was born in Bavaria. He moved to the United States and established an independent Lutheran church that paid him $50 ($1,479 in 2025) a month. It was said that he had other sources of income buying and selling land.

== Murder ==
Kayser's St. James' Lutheran Church was based in Tolleston, a suburb of Gary, Indiana. His community had a number of German immigrants, some of whom supported Imperial Germany and its Central Powers allies, along with a number of Slavic immigrants who favored Russia and its Entente Powers allies. During his sermons, he would often anger people by espousing pro-German views. Threats against his life had gotten so bad that members of his church had to escort him from the church to his home.

Late one night, Kayser was confronted by several people in the study of his house. His wife and two daughters were visiting family in Grand Rapids, Michigan. Police say that broken furniture in the study showed that Kayser had put up a fight before he was subdued. He was bound by a cord, carried out, shot, and dumped in some bushes near his house. The gunshot wounds were to his chest and his jugular vein. Police were able to determine that no valuables or money had been taken from his house. His body was found an hour later by August Schultz and his wife. Medical examiners later determined that he had bled out from his neck wound.

The postmaster, Snyder, entered the case when it was revealed that a woman had sent Kayser a threatening letter to stay away from a woman in Gary, Mrs. Mary Krause. Krause denied any type of relationship with Kayser. Chief of Police Heinz ordered police to interview the Gary woman. The letters had many threats such as "Move away or dynamite will move"; another read: "Before the leaves turn you will be stretched on the ground."

George Schneider, a member of the Gary Saxon Terien, was named as a suspect after he revealed that he had gotten in a fight the same night Kayser was killed and had bruises and scratches on his face.

== See also ==
- Opposition to World War I
- German Americans

== Bibliography ==
Notes

References

- "Murder of Preacher in Suburb Near Gary, Indiana, Causes Federal and State Officers to Hunt for Possible Motive". Bisbee Daily Review. Bisbee, Cochise, Arizona: W.B. Kelly. August 26, 1915. ISSN 2157-3255. OCLC 11363144.
- "Preacher was murdered for too much war talk". The Daily Gate City. Keokuk, Lee, Iowa: J.B. Howell. August 25, 1915. ISSN 2375-3056. OCLC 9299506.
- "German Pastor Assassinated". Evening Times-Republican. Marshalltown, Marshall, Iowa: Times-Republican Print. Co. August 25, 1915. pp. 1–12. ISSN 2375-320X. OCLC 11826833.
- Kirschbaum, Erik (September 23, 2015). "Whatever Happened to German America?". New York Times.
- Library of Congress (April 23, 2014). "The Germans in America". United States of America.
- Tolzmann, Don Heinrich (1998). Germanophobia in the U. S.: The Anti-German Hysteria and Sentiment of the World Wars. K. G. Saur. ISBN 9783598215384. - Total pages: 354
- "Murdered Pastor Had Many Enemies". The Washington Times. Washington, District of Columbia: Times Pub. Co. 2020. pp. 1–12. ISSN 1941-0697. OCLC 10630160.
