= Westside (Gary, Indiana) =

- Neighborhood
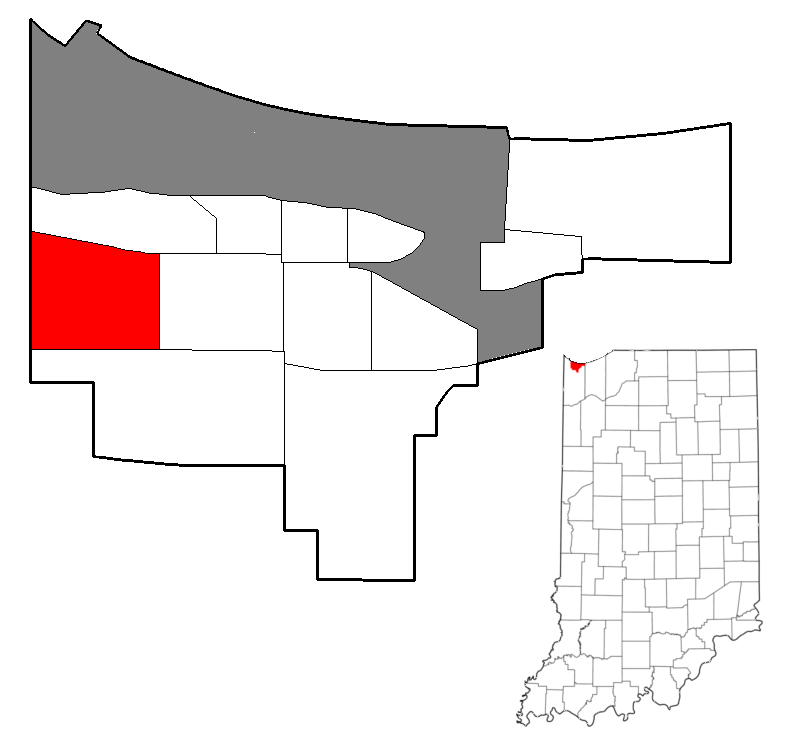
- Location within the city of Gary
- Coordinates: 41.594991°N 87.407868°W
- Country: United States
- State: Indiana
- County: Lake County
- City: Gary

Population (2000)
  - Total: 6,153
- Time zone: UTC-6 (CST)
  - Summer (DST): UTC-5 (CDT)
- ZIP code: 46406
- Area code: 219

- In Gary, "West Side" may also refer collectively to the neighborhoods west of Broadway, including Westside, Downtown West, Brunswick, Ambridge Mann and Tolleston.

Westside (also spelled West Side) is a neighborhood in west-central Gary, Indiana, USA, bounded by the Cline Avenue expressway on the west, the Norfolk Southern railroad on the north, Clark Road on the east and 25th Avenue on the south. It lies directly east of the Hessville neighborhood of Hammond. Within Gary, it adjoins the neighborhoods of Brunswick, Tolleston and Black Oak. In 2000, Westside had a population of 6,153, which was 63.3% African-American and 31.9% white, with 10.1% Hispanic ethnicity.

Much of the neighborhood's acreage is devoted to industrial and institutional uses, including a landfill. Westside's housing stock is concentrated in the northeast and southern areas. In 2000, its 2,340 housing units were 92% occupied and 60% owner-occupied. Most development in the area occurred after 1960, giving it a younger housing stock than most other Gary neighborhoods. In 2007, the neighborhood had the third highest housing values in Gary, behind Miller and Ambridge Mann.

The 1964 comprehensive plan for Gary had designated the entire Westside area for industrial use, but "the area was invaded by speculators, who built isolated housing tracts". Construction continued into the 1970s, including some affordable housing projects. Westside and Miller were the only neighborhoods in Gary to increase population between 1970 and 1980, when Westside's population reached 6,368. However, stagnation and crime have led to business closures, such as when the Jewel supermarket serving the area closed because repeated thefts and robberies. Today, retail business in Westside is quite limited, except for a retail cluster near the Burr Street exit of the Borman Expressway, on the boundary between Westside and Black Oak. Due to increases in vacancy, "three of the schools which once served as community anchors" are now vacant.

Westside has an elementary school and West Side High School. There is an 8-acre city park, Seberger Park, near the neighborhood's southwestern corner.
