= Roxana (East Chicago) =

- Neighborhood
- Interactive map of Roxana
- Coordinates: 41°36′43″N 87°29′30″W
- Country: United States
- State: Indiana
- County: Lake County
- City: East Chicago
- Time zone: UTC-6 (CST)
  - Summer (DST): UTC-5 (CDT)
- ZIP code: 46312
- Area code: 219

Roxana, sometimes spelled Roxanna, is a neighborhood in southwestern East Chicago, Indiana, south of the Grand Calumet River and north of Michigan Street. It is the only East Chicago neighborhood located south of the Grand Calumet. As of 2013, it was home to approximately 1032 people, of whom 6.5% were Hispanic and 8% were African American.

Roxana is adjoined on the north by East Chicago's Southside neighborhood, to the east by the industrial area of Hammond north of Hessville, on the south by Hammond's Woodmar neighborhood and the Gibson Yard, and on the west by Central Hammond. The neighborhood is traversed by the Indiana Toll Road and by the South Shore Line passenger railroad, which stops in Roxana at the East Chicago station.

Roxana takes its name from Roxana Petroleum, an oil company later absorbed by Shell Oil, which built a major refinery adjacent to the neighborhood in 1927. The refinery proper was located in Hammond (just south of United States Route 20), while the associated tank farm was located in Roxana. A pipeline carried sulfuric acid from the Grasselli Chemical plant to the refinery. The Shell and Roxana oil companies are remembered today in the names of the neighborhood's Roxana Drive and Shell Street.

Roxana is home to the Roxana Marsh, an important natural area and migrant bird habitat along the Grand Calumet River. Birds found there range from moorhens to Hudsonian godwits. The restoration of the Roxana Marsh, which was completed in 2013, involved the removal of six hundred thousand cubic yards of sediment contaminated with PCBs, PAHs, heavy metals, and other contaminants.
