= William H. Penman =

American politician

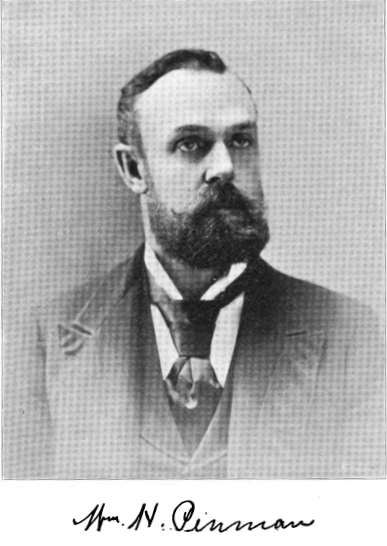

1st Mayor of East Chicago
- In office 1893–1898
- Succeeded by: William Hale

Personal details
- Born: May 18, 1858 Hammondsville, Ohio
- Died: November 30, 1917 (aged 59) Beaumont, Texas
- Party: Republican
- Spouse: Alice McCoy
- Profession: Storage tank manufacturer

William Hunter Penman (May 18, 1858 – November 30, 1917) was the first known permanent resident of East Chicago, Indiana, and later its first mayor.

== Early life ==
Penman was born in 1858 in Hammondsville, Ohio, to Scottish parents John Penman and Margaret Frazer. At the age of ten, he left school to work as a cooper.

In 1878, Penman went to work in the storage tank works of his brother-in-law, William Graver, in Pittsburgh. The Graver Tank Company was then expanding due to heavy demand from the Standard Oil Company. Penman soon became supervisor of the Pittsburgh works, a position he later also held at the company's subsequent locations in Lima, Ohio and Chicago, Illinois.

On December 13, 1883, Penman married Alice McCoy, of Enon Valley, Pennsylvania. They had two children.

== East Chicago ==
In 1888, William Graver sent Penman to East Chicago to supervise the construction of the new Graver Tank Works there. Penman arrived in June 1888. At the time, the development of East Chicago had only just begun, with the completion of a railroad line to the city by the Chicago & Calumet Terminal Railway earlier the same year. The Graver Tank Works was the first set of buildings in the city.

Upon moving to East Chicago with his family, Penman built a two-story home at the corner of Tod and 148th Street, in what is today the city's Southside neighborhood. The Penmans boarded in nearby Hammond until the house was complete. The two-story house, which was soon joined by others, stood across the street from the Graver Tank Works. The Gravers' was the first home built in East Chicago.

The following year, in 1889, East Chicago was incorporated as a town. Penman was elected treasurer of the town council.

East Chicago held a special election of municipal officers on March 14, 1893, in order to become a city. Penman was elected mayor. He was reelected in April 1894.

In the 1894 election, Penman (a Republican) was opposed by the Democratic candidate, Colonel Redmond D. Walsh. In August 1895, Walsh swore out a warrant against Penman, accusing him of improperly using his office to secure a public contract for water mains. Penman thus became the first of many East Chicago mayors to face public corruption charges. However, when the case was tried to a jury, the jury not only acquitted Penman, but jointly issued a public testimonial to his character. In October 1895, Penman sued Walsh for defamation.

As mayor, Penman sought to establish the necessary infrastructure for urban development, including a municipal water supply and fire department. However, these utilities ultimately went bankrupt due to the city's inadequate finances in this early stage.

For a time in the 1890s, Penman and George McCoy operated the Penman & McCoy Tank and Boiler-Making Works in East Chicago. However, the works entered receivership and were sold in 1898.

== Texas ==
In 1901, Penman formed his own company, the Penman Tank Company. Initially based in East Chicago, the company moved to Beaumont, Texas in 1902. Before the factory was even built in Beaumont, Penman Tank already had $500,000 in contracts, including from the Southern Pacific Railroad.

Penman died in on November 30, 1917, and was buried in Beaumont.
