= Carlson Oxbow Park =

Nature park in Hammond, Indiana, US

Coordinates: 41°34′20″N 87°27′10″W

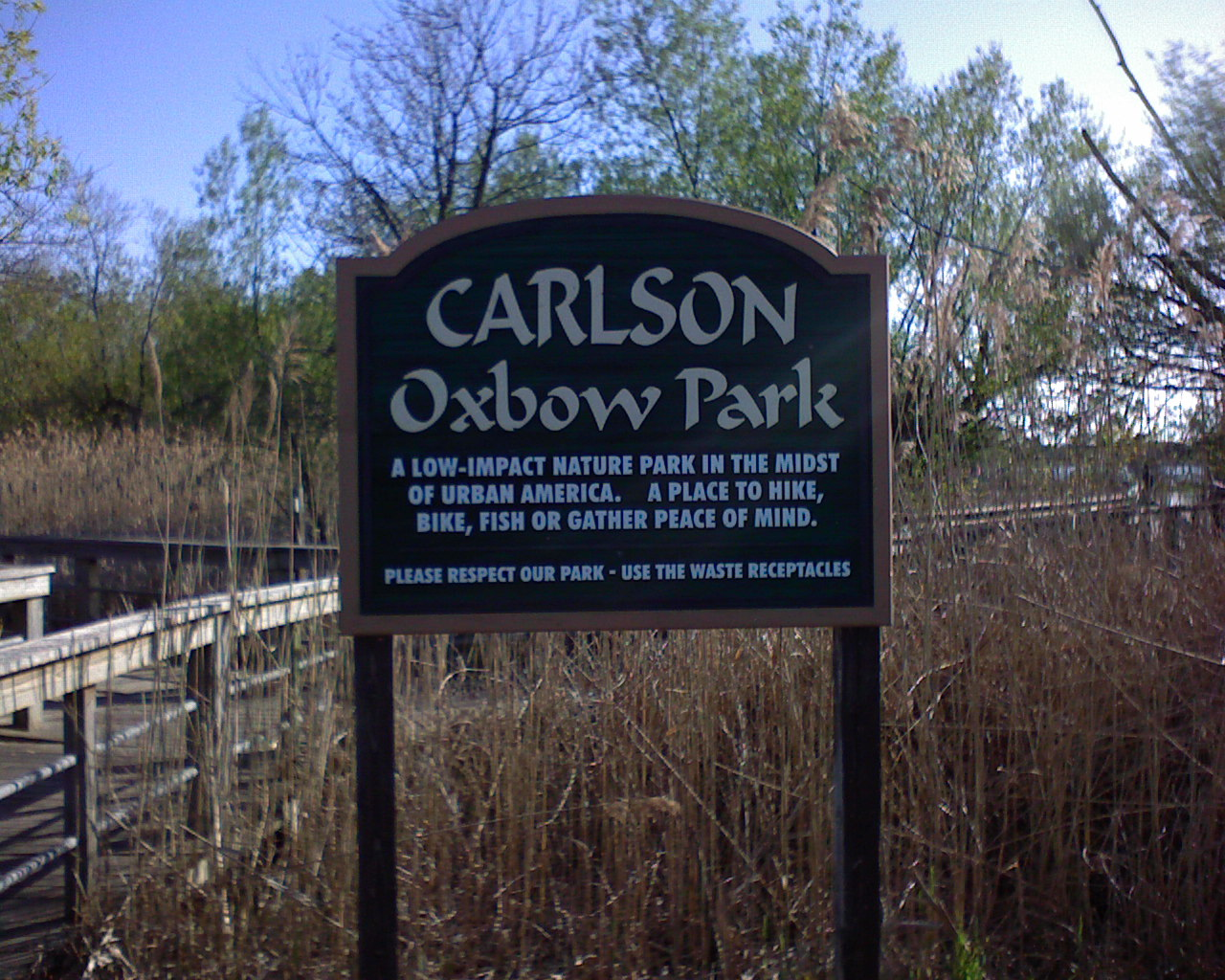
- Park Entrance Sign
- Interactive map of Carlson Oxbow Park
- Location: Hessville, Hammond, Indiana
- Area: 89 acres (36 ha)
- Created: October 7, 1998

Carlson Oxbow Park is an 89 acres (36 ha) nature park located in the Hessville neighborhood of Hammond, Indiana, along the north bank of the Little Calumet River and immediately south of the Borman Expressway. It takes its name from a sharp bend in the Little Calumet that was left behind when the river was straightened in the 20th century, forming an oxbow lake.

== History ==
The park was first purchased in 1964 for flood control, but the river was straightened in 1975 forming the oxbow. It was dedicated to George W. Carlson, a 32-year member of the Hammond City Council who had played a key role in the park's formation, on October 7, 1998.

== Wildlife ==
Carlson Oxbow Park holds a variety of wildlife species. It is home to the following wetland species: red fox, raccoon, woodchuck, leopard frog and the Eastern cottontail rabbit. It also holds over 50 species of birds including the cardinal, house wren, peregrine falcon, eared grebe and the blue winged teal.
