= List of mayors of East Chicago, Indiana =

This is a list of mayors of East Chicago, Indiana. East Chicago was incorporated as a town in 1889, and became a city in 1893.

	Mayor	Term start	Term end	Party
1	William H. Penman (1858–1917; aged 59)	1893	1898	Republican
2	William F. Hale (1866–1914; aged 48)	1898	1906	Republican
3	Edward DeBriae (1844–1940; aged 96)	1906	1914	Democratic
4	Frank Callahan (1st)	1914	1918	Citizens' Party
5	Leo McCormack	1918	1922	Republican
6	Frank Callahan (2nd)	1922	1926	Independent
7	Raleigh P. Hale	1926	January 27, 1930	Republican
8	Thomas W. O'Connor	1930	1933	Republican
9	George H. Lewis	1933	1935	Republican
10	Andrew Rooney	1935	1939	Republican
11	Frank J. Migas	1939	1952	Democratic
12	Walter M. Jeorse	January 1, 1952	1963	Democratic
13	John B. Nicosia	January 1964	December 1971	Democratic
14	Robert A. Pastrick (1928–2014; aged 88)	January 1, 1972	December 31, 2004	Democratic
15	George Pabey (born in 1975; age 50)	January 1, 2005	September 24, 2010	Democratic
–	Charles P. Pacurar (1936–2012; aged 76)	September 24, 2010	October 16, 2010	Democratic
16	Anthony Copeland (born in 1955; age 69–70)	October 16, 2010	Present	Democratic
