= Woodmar Mall =

Shopping mall in Hammond, Indiana, US (1954–2006)

- Location: Hammond, Indiana, United States
- Coordinates: 41.593897°N 87.481668°W
- Address: Indianapolis Boulevard between 165th Street and 167th Street
- Opened: 1954
- Closed: 2006 (demolished 2006 and 2019)
- Developer: Landau & Heyman
- Architect: Victor Gruen
- Num. of anchor tenants: 1
- Floors: 1 (3 floors for the Carson Pirie Scott and Co. store)
- Public transit: GPTC

Woodmar Mall was an indoor shopping mall located at Indianapolis Boulevard between 165th Street and 167th Street in Hammond, Indiana. It opened in 1954 and was anchored by Carson Pirie Scott and Co. The mall was closed and demolished in 2006 except for the Carson's store which remained open until 2018 and which was demolished in 2019. The site is now occupied by the Hammond Sportsplex & Community Center.

== History ==
The Chicago-based developers Landau & Heyman purchased a 20-acre lot in the Woodmar neighborhood of Hammond, Indiana in 1953. They commissioned architect Victor Gruen, who designed the mall as a "v" with a Carson Pirie Scott and Co. store in the center. The shopping center was constructed at a cost of $3 million and opened in early 1954 with eight stores including J. J. Newberry and National Supermarkets. Fourteen additional stores opened on May 19 of that same year. The Carson's store was the first one established by the Chicago-based merchant in the state of Indiana and opened on November 1, 1954. In 1964, the Carson's store was expanded from 65,000 sq. ft. to 115,000 with the addition of a third floor. The following year, the mall was enclosed.

After J.J. Newberry left the mall, its former space was subdivided into a 15-store "mini mall" called the "Court of Lions" which opened in September 1975. This generated three times the rent the Newberry's store had provided and a combined business volume "between three and four times that of the variety store." The Court of Lions saw its revenues increase by 50% over the course of the next three years. It was modeled after the Court of the Lions in Granada, Spain. A similar mini-mall, the "Court of Turtles" opened in 1977 in the space originally occupied by National Supermarkets. Plans in the early 1980s to add two additional anchor stores were cancelled due to a recession and high interest rates. A renovation of the mall began in 1987 and was completed in 1990. In January 1999, a Dominick's (now Food 4 Less) grocery store opened on the west side of the mall's outlot. A Walmart discount store then opened in the surrounding area on June 14, 2000.

Long-term competition from the River Oaks Center in Calumet City, Illinois and Southlake Mall in Hobart, Indiana drew business away from Woodmar and led to the mall's decline. By 2004, fewer than a dozen stores remained open. In February 2006, the decision was made to demolish the mall except for the Carson's store. The Hammond Redevelopment Commission announced plans in June 2016 for a $12 million sports complex to be built on the site of the former mall. The Carson's store closed in 2018 as part of its parent company's liquidation. The Hammond Sportsplex & Community Center opened on the site of the former Woodmar Mall in September 2018. Demolition of the former Carson's store began in August 2019.

== See also ==
- List of shopping malls in the United States
