= Southside (East Chicago) =

- Neighborhood
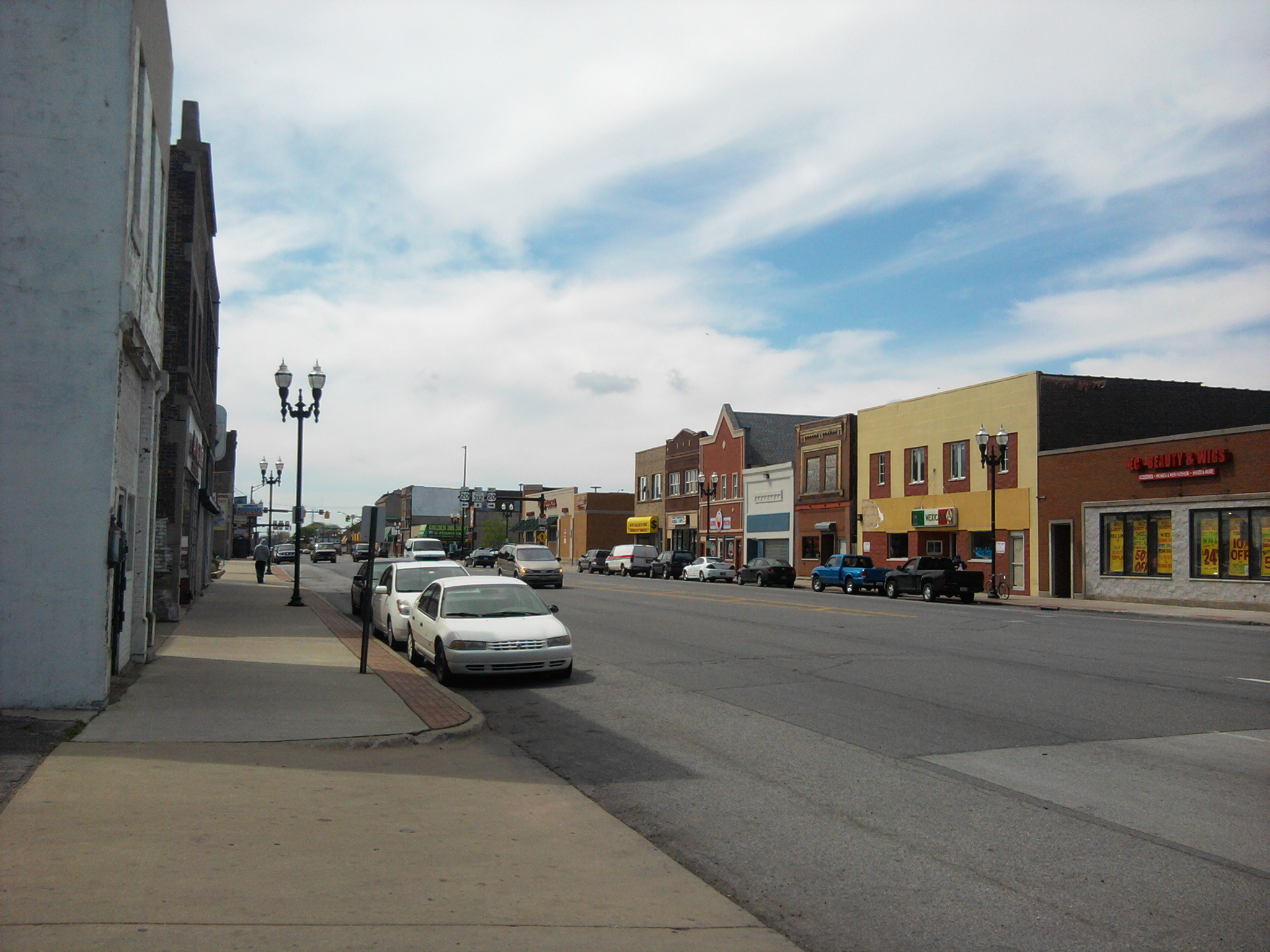
- Chicago Avenue, the dividing line between Southside and Northside
- Interactive map of Southside
- Coordinates: 41°37′30″N 87°28′51″W
- Country: United States
- State: Indiana
- County: Lake County
- City: East Chicago

Area
  - Total: 1.0 km^{2} (0.39 sq mi)

Population (2013)
  - Total: 6,210
  - Density: 6,200/km^{2} (16,000/sq mi)
- Time zone: UTC-6 (CST)
  - Summer (DST): UTC-5 (CDT)
- ZIP code: 46312
- Area code: 219

Southside or South Side is a neighborhood in western East Chicago, Indiana. Together with Northside and Roxana, it makes up "East Chicago proper," as distinct from Indiana Harbor. The population is 64% Hispanic and 25% African American. The neighborhood is home to 20% of East Chicago's population. The neighborhood is dominated by residential properties, with relatively few institutional buildings.

Southside is bounded on the north by the commercial corridor along Chicago Avenue (Indiana State Road 312), and on the south by the Grand Calumet River. To the east, the residential area is bounded by Indianapolis Boulevard; beyond that lies the industrial district along the Indiana Harbor and Ship Canal. To the west, Southside adjoins North Hammond.

Southside was the site of the very first home built in East Chicago, that of William H. Penman (later East Chicago's first mayor), built in 1888. Most of the residential development in East Chicago's first decades, prior to the 20th century, took place in this neighborhood.
