= Morse Dell Plain House and Garden =

Historic house in Indiana, United States

- U.S. National Register of Historic Places
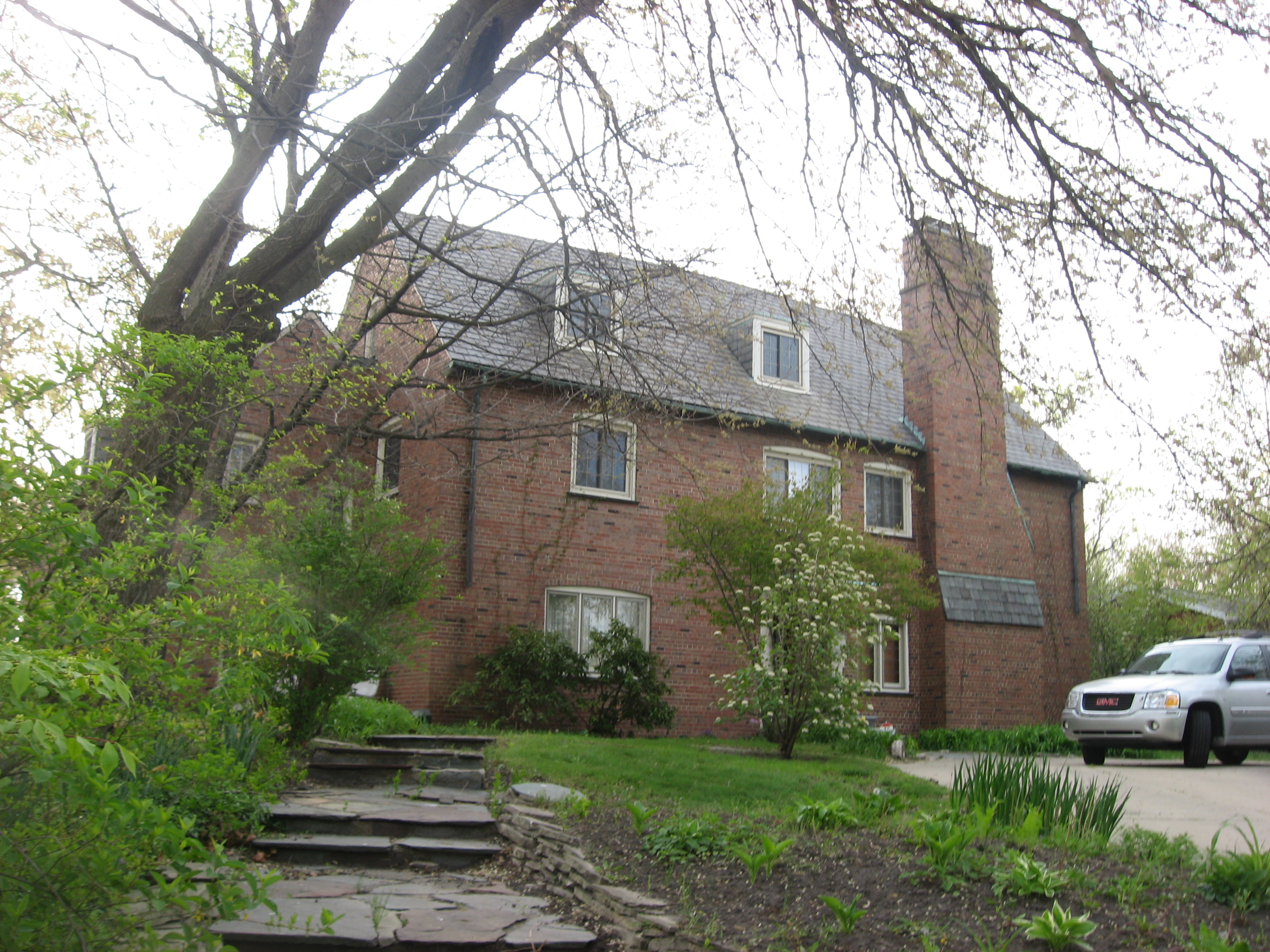
- Morse Dell Plain House and Garden, April 2012

- Location within Indiana Location within the United States
- Location: 7109 Knickerbocker Pkwy., Hammond, Indiana
- Coordinates: 41°35′3″N 87°28′39″W
- Area: less than one acre
- Built: 1923, 1926
- Architect: Howard Van Doren Shaw; Jens Jensen
- Architectural style: Tudor Revival, Prairie School
- NRHP reference No.: 98000298
- Added to NRHP: April 1, 1998

Morse Dell Plain House and Garden, also known as Woodmar, is a historic home located at 7109 Knickerbocker Parkway in Hammond, Indiana. The house was designed by noted Chicago architect Howard Van Doren Shaw and built in 1923. It is a large two-story, Tudor Revival style brick dwelling with a 1 1/2-story service wing. The landscape was designed by Jens Jensen in 1926.

It was listed in the National Register of Historic Places in 1998.

== See also ==
- National Register of Historic Places listings in Lake County, Indiana
