= Forest–Moraine Residential Historic District =

Historic district in Indiana, United States

- U.S. National Register of Historic Places
- U.S. Historic district
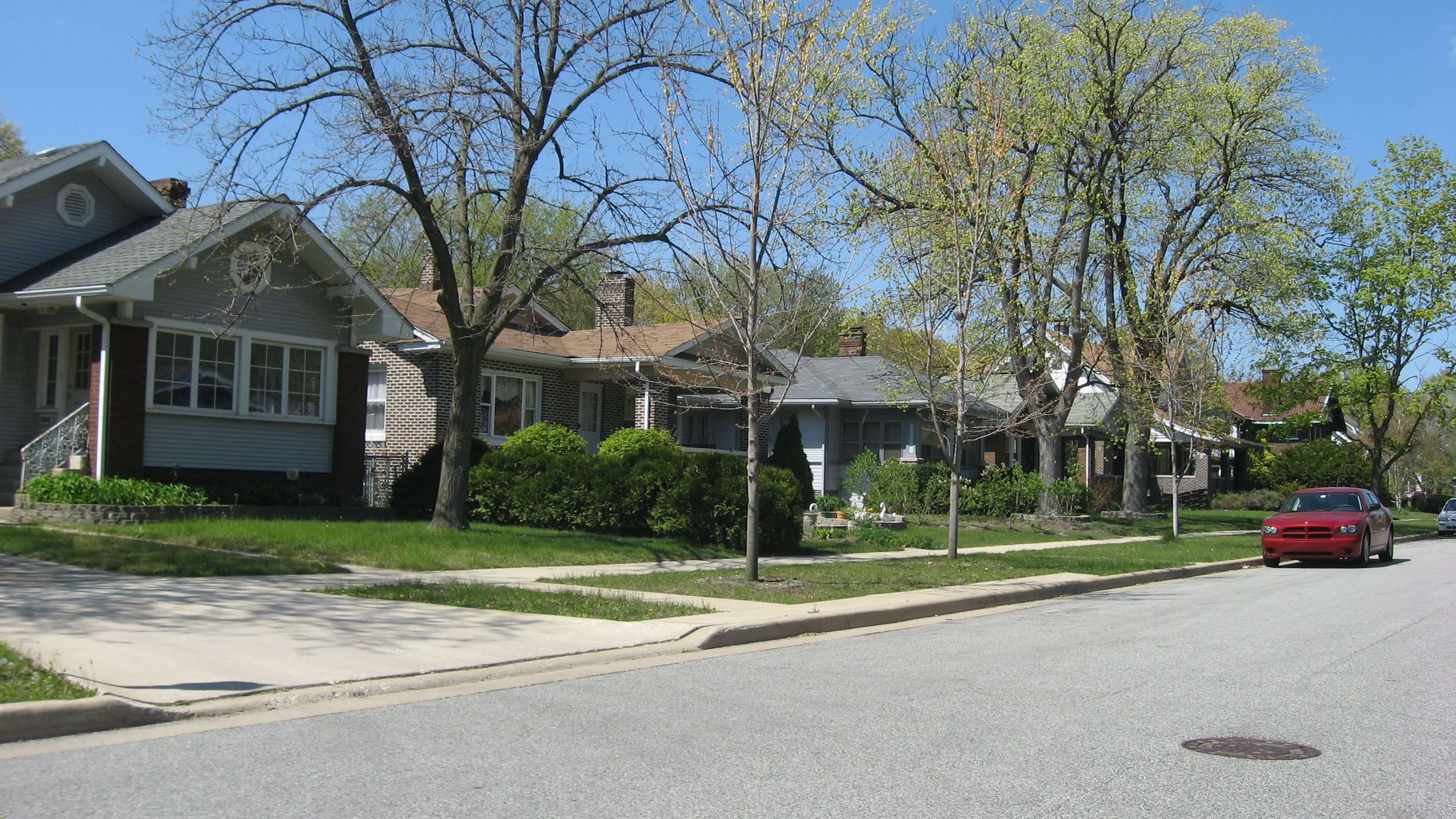
- Forest–Moraine Residential Historic District, April 2012

- Location within Indiana Location within the United States
- Location: Roughly bounded by Wildwood Rd., 165th St., Hohman Ave. and State Line Ave., Hammond, Indiana
- Coordinates: 41°35′53″N 87°31′24″W
- Area: 65 acres (26 ha)
- Architectural style: Late 19th And 20th Century Revivals, English Cottage
- MPS: Historic Residential Suburbs in the United States, 1830-1960 MPS
- NRHP reference No.: 10000777
- Added to NRHP: September 23, 2010

Forest–Moraine Residential Historic District is a national historic district located at Hammond, Indiana. The district encompasses 108 contributing buildings in an exclusively residential section of Hammond. It developed between about 1913 and 1950, and includes notable example of Renaissance Revival, Colonial Revival, Tudor Revival, and English Cottage style residential architecture.

It was listed in the National Register of Historic Places in 2010.
