= Hessville, Indiana =

Hessville
- Neighborhood
- Interactive map of Hessville
- Coordinates: 41°35′44″N 87°27′42″W
- Country: United States
- State: Indiana
- County: Lake County
- City: Hammond
- Unincorporated: 1852
- Annexed by Hammond: 1923
- Elevation: 181 m (594 ft)
- Time zone: UTC-6 (CST)
  - Summer (DST): UTC-5 (CDT)
- ZIP code: 46323
- Area code: 219

Hessville is a neighborhood of Hammond, Indiana, United States. Located in the southeast corner of Hammond, it adjoins the Hammond neighborhood of Woodmar to the west, the East Chicago neighborhood of Calumet to the north, the Gary neighborhoods of Westside and Black Oak to the east, and the town of Highland to the south. The neighborhood's boundaries correspond to Hammond's Planning District VI.

Notable natural areas in Hessville include the Carlson Oxbow Park, Gibson Woods, and the Seidner Dune and Swale preserve operated by the Shirley Heinze Land Trust. Much of the neighborhood is built on a former dune and swale landscape.

Notable people from Hessville include Jean Shepherd, whose movie A Christmas Story is set in a fictionalized version of mid-20th-century Hessville.

The town was founded by local merchants Joseph and Elizabeth Hess in 1852. Hessville was incorporated in 1918, but following a legal battle its incorporation was invalidated. The town was annexed by Hammond in 1923.
