= Ambridge Mann =

- Neighborhood
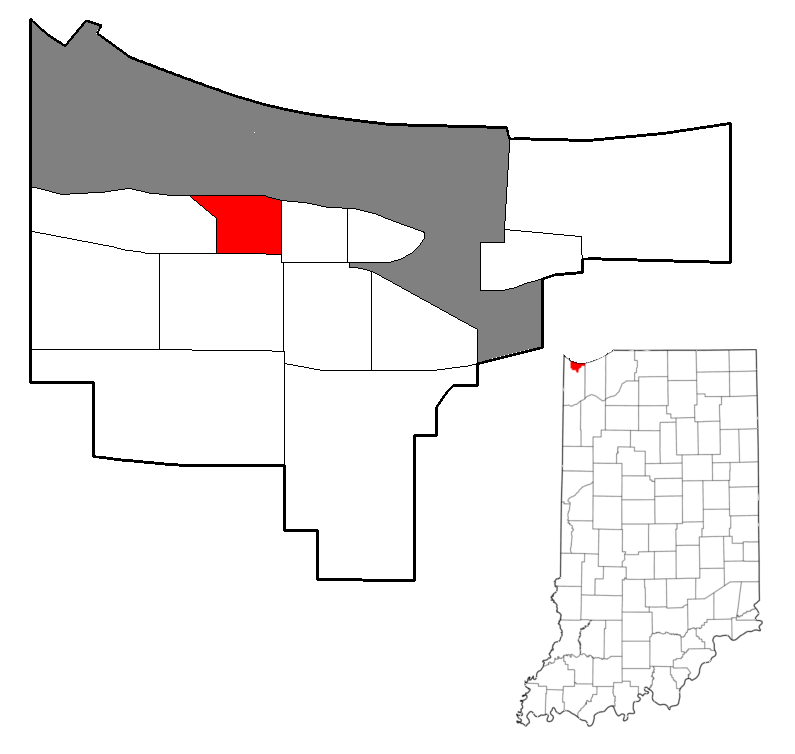
- Location within the city of Gary
- Coordinates: 41.601548°N 87.359294°W
- Country: United States
- State: Indiana
- County: Lake County
- City: Gary
- Founded: 1910

Population (2000)
  - Total: 6,236
- Time zone: UTC-6 (CST)
  - Summer (DST): UTC-5 (CDT)
- ZIP code: 46404
- Area code: 219

Ambridge Mann, sometimes called Ambridge-Horace Mann or Horace Mann-Ambridge, is a neighborhood in northwestern Gary, Indiana. It is bounded by the Grand Calumet River on the north, by Grant Street on the east, by Chase Street on the west, and by the Norfolk Southern railroad on the south. Adjacent areas include an industrial district to the north, Downtown West to the east, Tolleston to the south, and Brunswick to the west. As of 2000, Ambridge Mann had a population of 6,236, which was 96.3% African-American. Located just south of Interstate 90, the neighborhood can be seen while passing Buchanan Street.

The neighborhood is home to Gary's only hospital, Methodist Northlake. A 7-acre city park, Ambridge Park, provides public access to the Grand Calumet waterfront. In May 2011, the Gary Board of Public Works and Safety announced it was moving forward with plans to construct a bicycle trail that would run along the Grand Calumet from Gary's western border to Ambridge Park. This is part of a larger Gary Green Link project, which will develop bicycle trails throughout the city.

Ambridge Mann was formerly considered to comprise two distinct neighborhoods, Ambridge and Horace Mann, lying north and south of 5th Avenue respectively. Ambridge took its name from the American Bridge Works, a subsidiary of U.S. Steel located on the north bank of the Grand Calumet River, and which also give its name to an elementary school in the neighborhood. Horace Mann was likewise named after a school in the neighborhood. The area was whites-only until the early 1970s, when the heavily Jewish community was replaced by middle-class African-Americans. Many former inhabitants of Ambridge Mann migrated to Miller Beach during this period. The neighborhood had a population of 8,920 in 1970.

In addition to Ambridge Elementary and Horace Mann High School, other schools formerly located in Ambridge Mann included Vohr Elementary and the Martin Luther King, Jr. Academy, an alternative high school.

Ambridge Mann is traversed by the South Shore Line, and bisected by U.S. highways 12 and 20, which run along 4th and 5th Avenues. The Indiana Toll Road runs just north of the neighborhood, on the north bank of the Grand Calumet River, with an interchange at Grant Street in the neighborhood's northeastern corner. Buses of the Gary Public Transportation Corporation serve the neighborhood. The South Shore Line formerly stopped at Ambridge station, but service there ended in 1994.

The housing stock is dominated by single-family homes, with a cluster of historic apartments along 5th Avenue; as of 2000, it had a 92% occupancy rate and 49% owner-occupancy rate. The neighborhood is chiefly residential, with a small pocket of commercial activity at the intersection of 5th and Bridge. The housing in Ambridge Mann was chiefly built in the first half of the twentieth century to house managers at the Gary Works. The neighborhood is home to a great number of prairie style and art deco homes. The Gary Masonic Temple is located in the neighborhood along with the Ambassador Apartment building. As of 2007, the neighborhood's home values were among Gary's highest, with a median of $70,145, second only to the lakefront neighborhood of Miller Beach.

Famous people from Ambridge Mann include Nobel laureate Joseph Stiglitz, who grew up in a brick bungalow near the river on Arthur Street.
