= Indi-Illi Park Historic District =

Historic district in Indiana, United States

- U.S. National Register of Historic Places
- U.S. Historic district
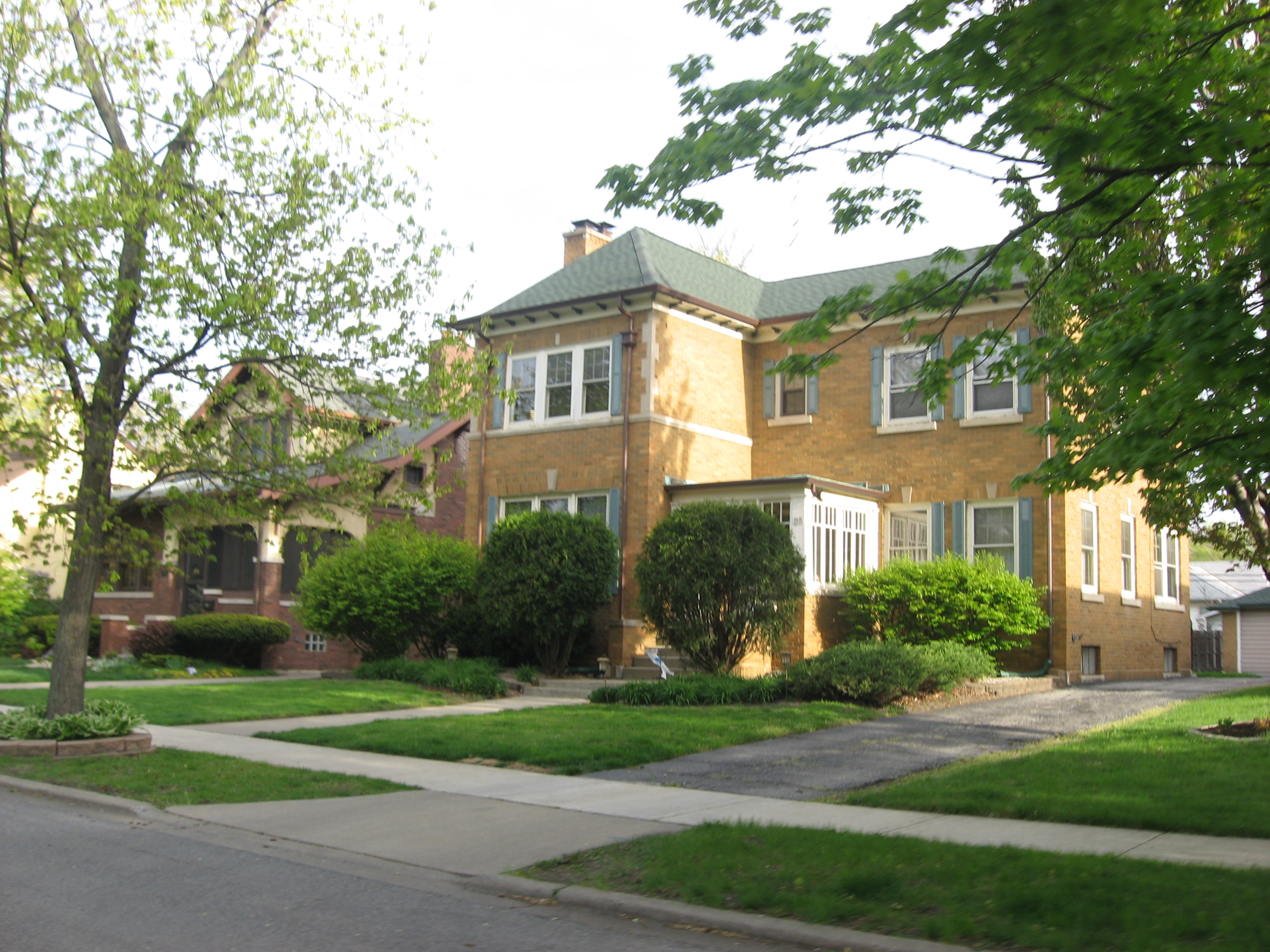
- Indi-Illi Park Historic District, November 2013

- Location within Indiana Location within the United States
- Location: Roughly bounded by Locust and 169th Sts., and Hohman and State Line Aves., Hammond, Indiana
- Coordinates: 41°35′24″N 87°31′28″W
- Area: 26 acres (11 ha)
- Architect: Bernard, Leslie Cosby, Sr.; Wachewicz, Frank J.
- Architectural style: Late 19th And 20th Century Revivals, Bungalow/Craftsman
- MPS: Historic Residential Suburbs in the United States, 1830-1960 MPS
- NRHP reference No.: 12000335
- Added to NRHP: June 15, 2012

Indi-Illi Park Historic District is a national historic district located at Hammond, Indiana. The district encompasses 93 contributing buildings in an exclusively residential section of Hammond. It developed between about 1923 and 1940, and includes notable example of Colonial Revival, Tudor Revival, Classical Revival, Bungalow / American Craftsman, and eclectic styles of residential architecture.

It was listed in the National Register of Historic Places in 2012.
