= Woodmar (Hammond) =

- Neighborhood
- Interactive map of Woodmar
- Coordinates: 41°35′06″N 87°29′25″W
- Country: United States
- State: Indiana
- County: Lake County
- City: Hammond
- Elevation: 184 m (604 ft)
- Time zone: UTC-6 (CST)
  - Summer (DST): UTC-5 (CDT)
- ZIP code: 46323, 46324
- Area code: 219

Woodmar is a neighborhood in southeast Hammond, Indiana, approximately between Columbia and Kennedy Avenues. It is bounded to the east by Hessville, to the west by South Hammond, to the north by industrial land along United States Route 20, and to the south by the town of Highland. The neighborhood's boundaries correspond to Hammond's Planning District V.

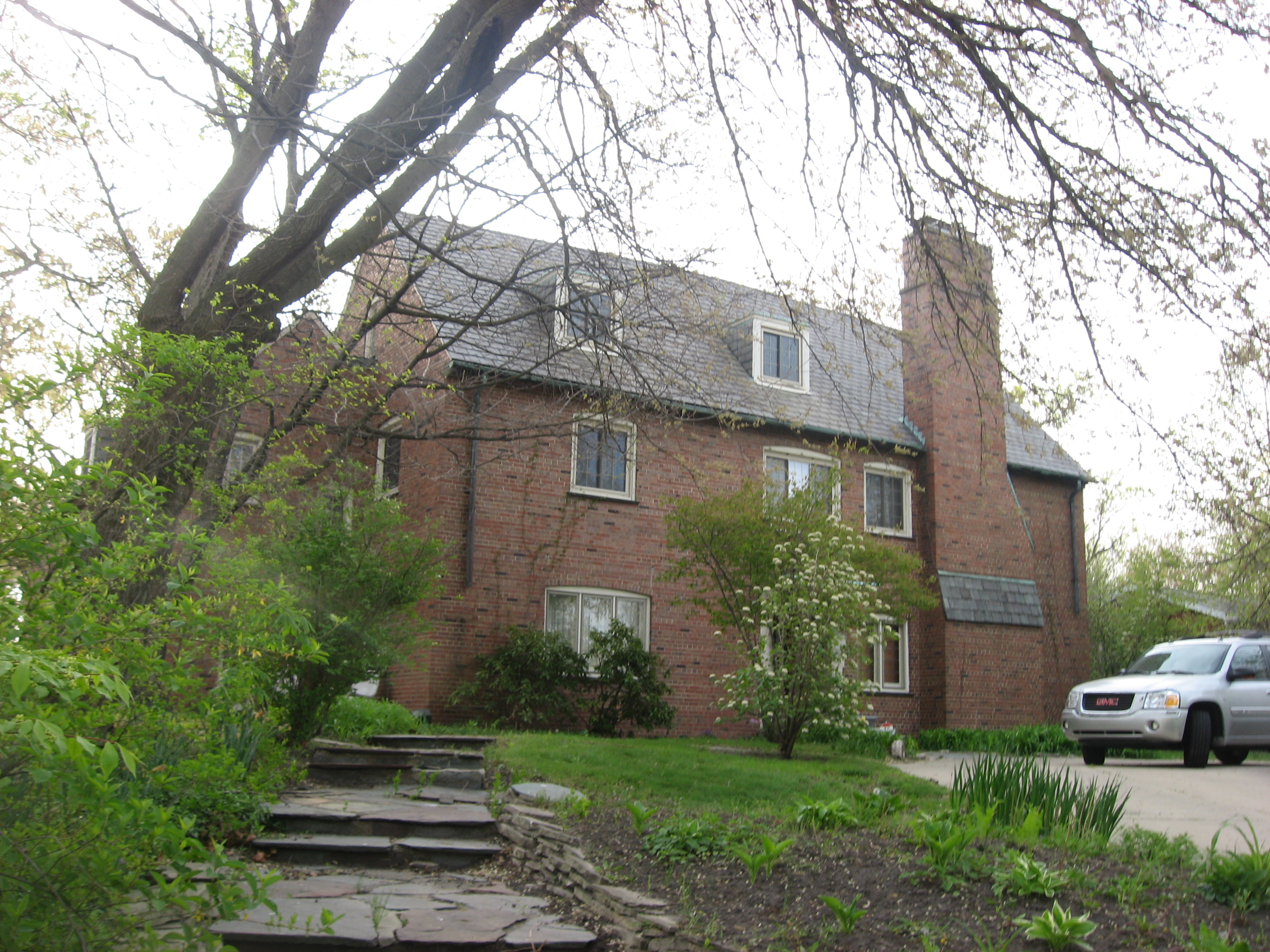
The Morse Dell Plain House and Garden in Woodmar.

Dominated by large single-family homes, Woodmar was largely built in the 1920s, with the goal of allowing the Calumet Region's wealthier residents to get "out of the smoke zone and into the ozone." In these early years, Woodmar was considered more exclusive than most Hammond neighborhoods.

Woodmar was formerly home to the Woodmar Mall. It is also home to the Hammond campus of Purdue University Northwest, formerly an independent institution known as Purdue University Calumet. Historic residences in the neighborhood include the Morse Dell Plain House and Garden.
