= State Street Commercial Historic District =

Historic district in Indiana, United States

- U.S. National Register of Historic Places
- U.S. Historic district
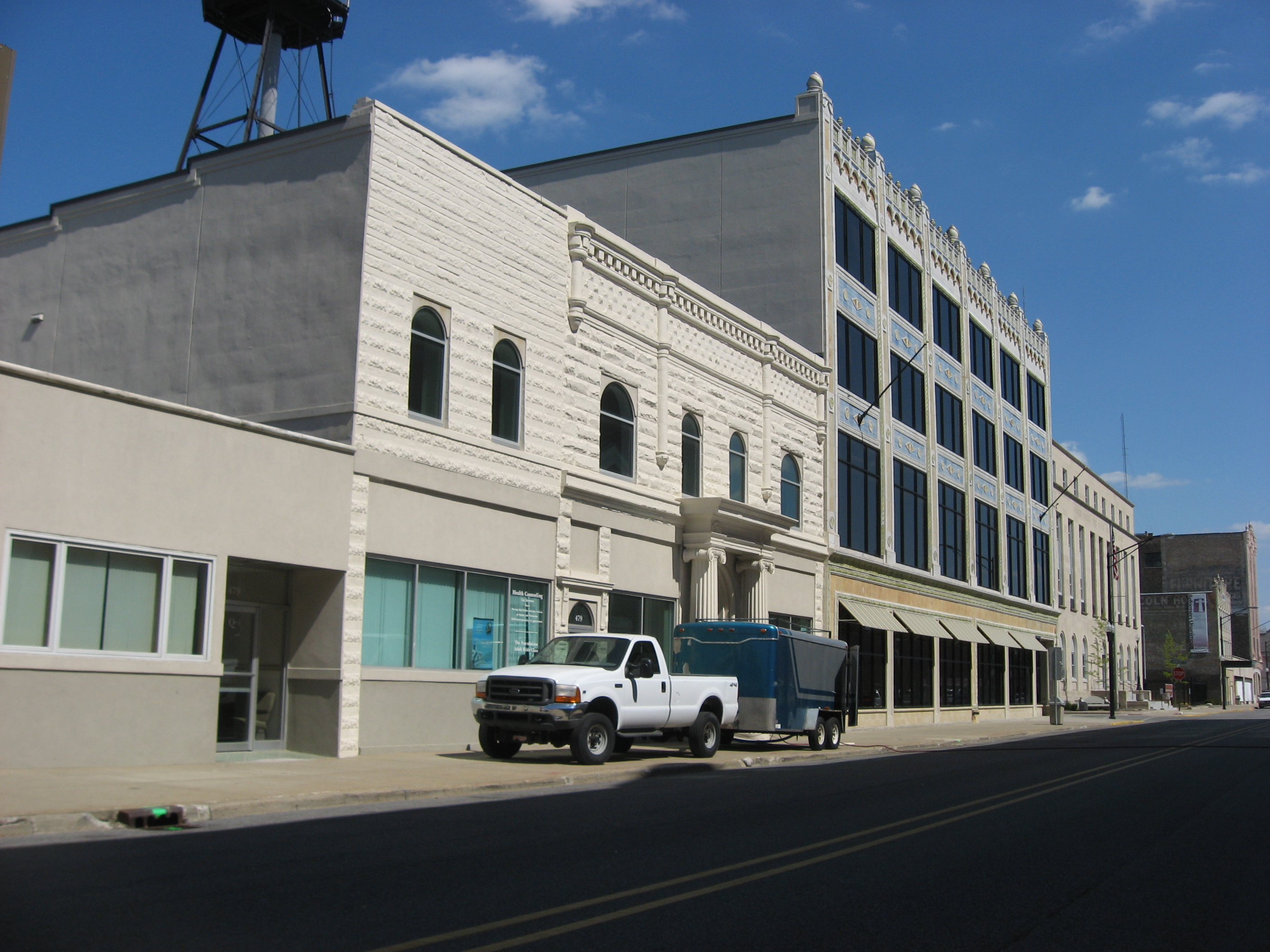
- State Street Commercial Historic District, April 2012

- Location within Indiana Location within the United States
- Location: Roughly State St., bet. Sohl and Bulletin Ave., Hammond, Indiana
- Coordinates: 41°37′07″N 87°31′00″W
- Area: 11 acres (4.5 ha)
- Architect: Bump, Edward; Berry, Addison
- Architectural style: Commercial, Classical Revival, Late Gothic Revival, Art Deco
- NRHP reference No.: 99001157
- Added to NRHP: September 17, 1999

State Street Commercial Historic District is a national historic district located at Hammond, Indiana. The district encompasses 28 contributing buildings in the central business district of Hammond. It developed between about 1885 and 1946, and includes notable example of Commercial, Classical Revival, Late Gothic Revival, and Art Deco style architecture. Notable buildings include the L. Fish Building (1927), Federal Building (1939), Lincoln Hotel (1923), Seifer Building (1925), and the Henderson Building (1902).

It was listed in the National Register of Historic Places in 1999.
