= North Hammond =

- Neighborhood
- Interactive map of North Hammond
- Coordinates: 41°37′52″N 87°30′50″W
- Country: United States
- State: Indiana
- County: Lake County
- City: Hammond
- Time zone: UTC-6 (CST)
  - Summer (DST): UTC-5 (CDT)
- ZIP Codes: 46320, 46327
- Area code: 219

North Hammond is a neighborhood in western Hammond, Indiana, north of the Grand Calumet River and south of Wolf Lake. It is bounded to the south by Central Hammond, to the west by the Chicago neighborhood of Hegewisch, to the north by Robertsdale, and to the east by East Chicago. The neighborhood's boundaries correspond to Hammond's Planning District II. The neighborhood is traversed by the Indiana Toll Road, which has an exit into the neighborhood at Calumet Avenue, and by the South Shore Line railroad. Passenger trains for the South Shore Line stop at Hammond Gateway station in the neighborhood.

The land area of North Hammond is dominated by industrial land uses. Residential uses are found chiefly south of the Indiana Toll Road. The greatest concentration of commercial activity is along Calumet Avenue, the neighborhood's principal north–south thoroughfare.

North Hammond is sometimes considered to include Robertsdale, thus embracing all of Hammond from the Grand Calumet River to Lake Michigan.
