= Tolleston =

- Neighborhood
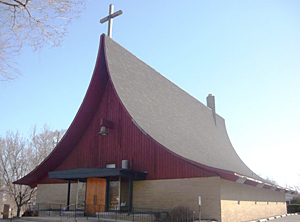
- St. Augustine's Episcopal Church

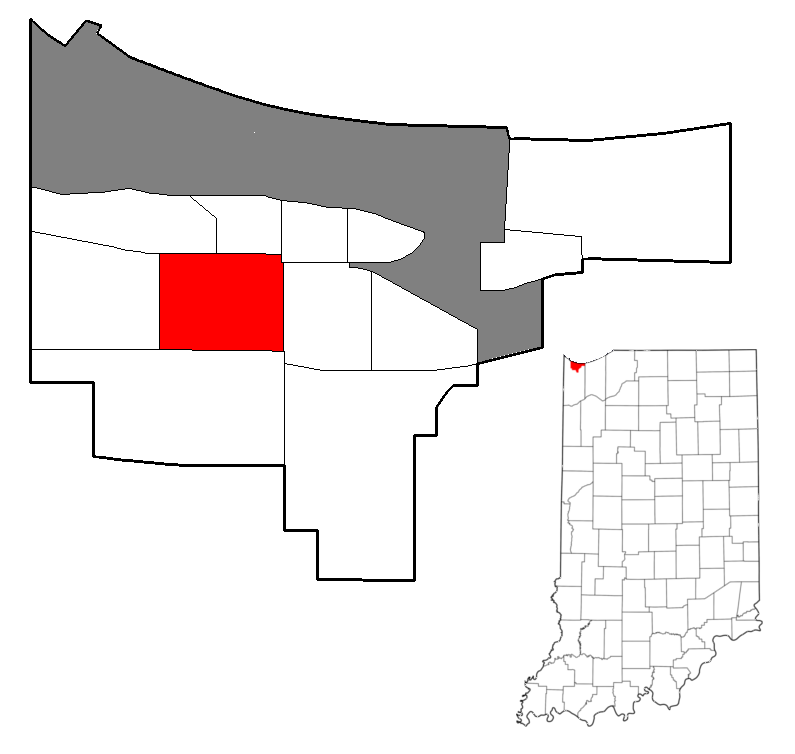
- Location within the city of Gary
- Coordinates: 41.584246°N 87.368386°W
- Country: United States
- State: Indiana
- County: Lake County
- City: Gary
- First settled: 1857
- Incorporated: 1906
- Annexed by Gary: 1910

Population (2000)
  - Total: 14,289
- Time zone: UTC-6 (CST)
  - Summer (DST): UTC-5 (CDT)
- ZIP code: 46404
- Area code: 219

Tolleston is a neighborhood and former town in west-central Gary, Indiana. It is situated south of Ambridge, west of Midtown, east of Westside and north of Black Oak. Tolleston is the site of two large city parks (MC Bennett Park and Tolleston Park), a historic cemetery, and the oldest church north of the Little Calumet River. The neighborhood's borders are defined by the Norfolk Southern tracks on the north, Grant Street on the east, 25th Avenue on the south, and Clark Road on the west. As of 2000, Tolleston had a population of 14,289, and was 97.5% African-American.

Tolleston is primarily residential, with commercial districts along 11th and 15th Avenues. The housing stock of Tolleston consists chiefly of single-family homes, which as of 2000 had a 92% occupancy rate. The neighborhood was served by the Tolleston Branch of the Gary Public Library which is now closed and is served by the Tolleston Station post office. Distinctive subdivisions within Tolleston include Tarrytown, running for ten blocks north-to-south between Clark Road and Whitcomb Street, and Small Farms at the neighborhood's southern end. Small Farms is the site of some of Gary's most expensive homes.

== History ==
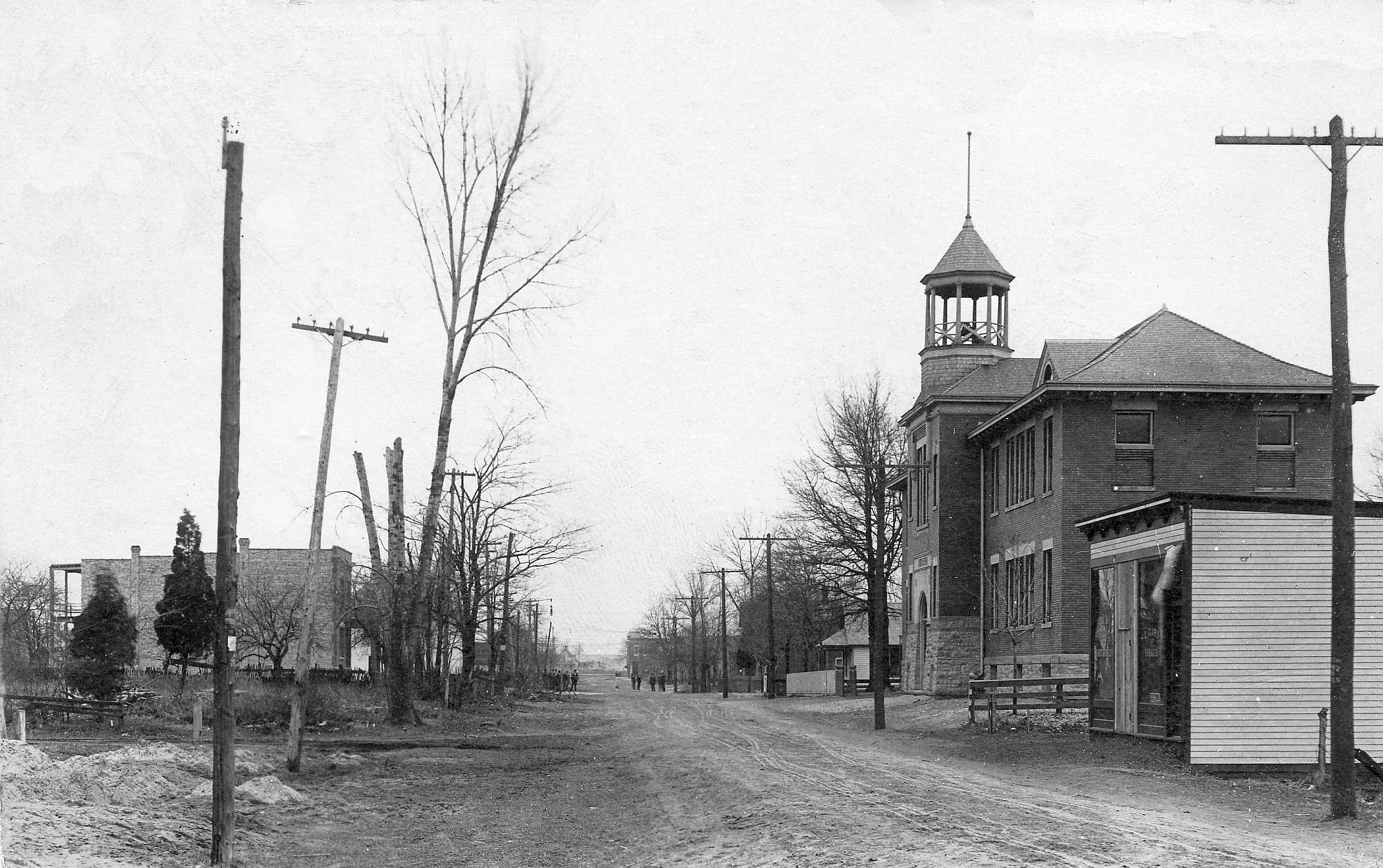
Tolleston, 1909

Tolleston was platted in 1857 by George Tolle. The Tolleston post office was established in 1860, and a Lutheran church in 1868; by 1870 the town contained approximately 80 families. The early population consisted chiefly of German immigrant farmers and railroad workers. In the late 19th century, sand mining and ice harvesting became the chief local industries. Prior to the founding of Gary in 1906, it was the principal settlement in the region, and Tolleston's Gibson Hotel was used as a base by the officials of US Steel planning the new city.

Tolleston was incorporated as an independent town on September 4, 1906, to prevent annexation by Gary. It was annexed nonetheless in 1910, as a byproduct of an annexation dispute between East Chicago and Gary. As a neighborhood of Gary, it was exclusively white until the early 1950s, when legal segregation in Gary ended; it was almost entirely African-American by 1985.

Tolleston is the birthplace of astronaut Frank Borman, for whom the nearby Borman Expressway is named.

Tolleston is the home of architecturally significant St. Augustine's Episcopal Church. Custom designed by renowned Modernist architect Edward D. Dart in 1958, the historically Black Episcopal church garnered two architecture awards. St. Augustine's Episcopal Church listed on the National Historic Register in 2013. It is located at the corner of Ellsworth Street and 19TH Avenue.

Tolleston is also the home of St. John's (Evangelical) Lutheran Church, located on the corner of 10th Avenue and Taft St. Originally a German Lutheran congregation, St. John's has baptismal dating back to 1863 and Church Board minutes from 1870. It is the oldest congregation in the Calumet region.
