= William Tecumseh Sherman =

United States Army general (1820–1891)

- Sherman wearing a black ribbon mourning Abraham Lincoln after his assassination, photograph by Mathew Brady, May 1865

Commanding General of the U.S. Army
- In office March 4, 1869 – November 1, 1883
- President: Ulysses S. Grant; Rutherford B. Hayes; James A. Garfield; Chester A. Arthur
- Preceded by: Ulysses S. Grant
- Succeeded by: Philip Sheridan

Acting United States Secretary of War
- In office September 6, 1869 – October 25, 1869
- President: Ulysses S. Grant
- Preceded by: John Aaron Rawlins
- Succeeded by: William W. Belknap

Personal details
- Born: February 8, 1820 Lancaster, Ohio, U.S.
- Died: February 14, 1891 (aged 71) New York City, U.S.
- Resting place: Calvary Cemetery, St. Louis, Missouri, U.S.
- Party: Republican
- Spouse: Eleanor Boyle Ewing (m. 1850; died 1888)
- Children: 8, including Thomas
- Parents: Charles Robert Sherman (father); Mary Hoyt Sherman (mother)
- Relatives: Charles Taylor Sherman (brother); John Sherman (brother); Hoyt Sherman (brother)
- Education: United States Military Academy (BS)
- Nicknames: Cump; Uncle Billy

Military service
- Allegiance: United States
- Branch/service: United States Army; Union Army
- Years of service: 1840–1853; 1861–1884
- Rank: Major general (Active); General of the Army (Postwar)
- Commands: XV Corps (1863); Army of the Tennessee (1863–1864); Military Division of the Mississippi (1864–1865); Department of the Missouri (1866–1869); Commanding General of the U.S. Army (1869–1883)
- Battles/wars: See battles': Second Seminole War; American Civil War; First Battle of Bull Run; Battle of Shiloh (WIA); Vicksburg campaign; Jackson Expedition; Chattanooga campaign; Meridian campaign; Atlanta campaign; Savannah campaign (March to the Sea); Carolinas campaign; American Indian Wars

William Tecumseh Sherman (/tɪˈkʌmsə/ tih-KUM-sə; February 8, 1820 – February 14, 1891) was an American businessman, author, and military officer, who served as a general in the Union army during the American Civil War (1861–1865). Sherman's service during that conflict earned him both recognition for his command of military strategy and criticism for the harshness of his scorched-earth policies that he implemented in his campaigns against the Confederate States.

Born in Lancaster, Ohio, into a politically prominent family, Sherman graduated in 1840 from the United States Military Academy at West Point. In 1853, he interrupted his military career to pursue private business ventures, without much success. In 1859, he became superintendent of the Louisiana State Seminary of Learning & Military Academy, now Louisiana State University. When Louisiana seceded from the United States in January 1861, Sherman resigned that position and moved to Missouri before accepting a commission as a colonel in the Union army. Sherman commanded a brigade of volunteers at the First Battle of Bull Run before he was transferred to the western theater. While stationed in Kentucky, his pessimism about the outlook of the war led to a nervous breakdown that required him to be briefly put on leave. He recovered and forged a close partnership with General Ulysses S. Grant. Sherman served under Grant in 1862 in the Battles of Fort Henry, Fort Donelson, and Shiloh. Sherman continued to serve under Grant in 1863, distinguishing himself in the campaigns that led to the fall of the Confederate stronghold of Vicksburg on the Mississippi River, and then in the Chattanooga campaign, which culminated with the routing of the Confederate armies in the state of Tennessee.

In 1864, when Grant went east to serve as the General-in-Chief of the Union Armies, Sherman succeeded him as the commander in the western theater. He led the capture of the strategic city of Atlanta, a military success that contributed to the re-election of President Abraham Lincoln. Sherman's subsequent "March to the Sea" through Georgia and the Carolinas involved little fighting but caused large-scale destruction of military and civilian infrastructure, a systematic policy intended to undermine the ability and willingness of the Confederacy to continue fighting. Sherman accepted the surrender of all the Confederate armies in the Carolinas, Georgia, and Florida in April 1865, but the terms that he negotiated were considered too generous by U.S. Secretary of War Edwin Stanton, who ordered General Grant to modify them.

When Grant became President of the United States in March 1869, Sherman succeeded him as Commanding General of the Army. Sherman served in that capacity from 1869 until 1883 and was responsible for the U.S. Army's engagement in the Indian Wars, in which he used "hard-war" tactics similar to those he had employed in the Civil War. He steadfastly refused to be drawn into party politics. In 1875, he published his memoirs, which became one of the best-known first-hand accounts of the Civil War.

== Early life ==
Sherman was born in 1820 in Lancaster, Ohio, near the banks of the Hocking River. His father, Charles Robert Sherman, a lawyer who was a justice on the Ohio Supreme Court, died unexpectedly of typhoid fever in 1829, and his mother, Mary Hoyt Sherman, was left a widow with eleven children and no inheritance. Nine-year-old Sherman was raised by a Lancaster neighbor and family friend, attorney Thomas Ewing. Ewing was a prominent member of the Whig Party who became U.S. senator for Ohio and the first Secretary of the Interior. Sherman was a fifth cousin three times removed of US founding father Roger Sherman.

Sherman's older brother Charles Taylor Sherman became a federal judge. One of his younger brothers, John Sherman, was one of the founders of the Republican Party and served as a U.S. representative, senator, and cabinet secretary. Another younger brother, Hoyt Sherman, was a successful banker. Two of his foster brothers served as major generals in the Union Army during the Civil War: Hugh Boyle Ewing, later an ambassador and author, and Thomas Ewing Jr., who was a defense attorney in the military trials of the Lincoln conspirators. Sherman's niece, Euthanasia Sherman Meade, was a pioneering woman physician in California.

=== Names ===
Sherman's unusual given name has always attracted attention. One 19th-century source, for example, states that "General Sherman, we believe, is the only eminent American named from an Indian chief". According to Sherman's Memoirs, he was named William Tecumseh because his father had "caught a fancy for the great chief of the Shawnees, 'Tecumseh'". However, Lloyd Lewis's 1932 biography claimed that Sherman was originally named only Tecumseh and that he acquired the name William at the age of nine or ten, when he was baptized as a Catholic at the behest of his foster family. According to Lewis's account, which was repeated by later authors, Sherman was baptized in the Ewing home by a Dominican priest who found the pagan name Tecumseh unsuitable and instead named the child William after the saint on whose feast day the baptism took place. Sherman had already been baptized as an infant by a Presbyterian minister and recent biographers believe, contrary to Lewis's claims, that he was probably given the first name William at that time. As an adult, Sherman signed all his correspondence, including to his wife, "W. T. Sherman". His friends and family called him "Cump".

=== Military training and service ===
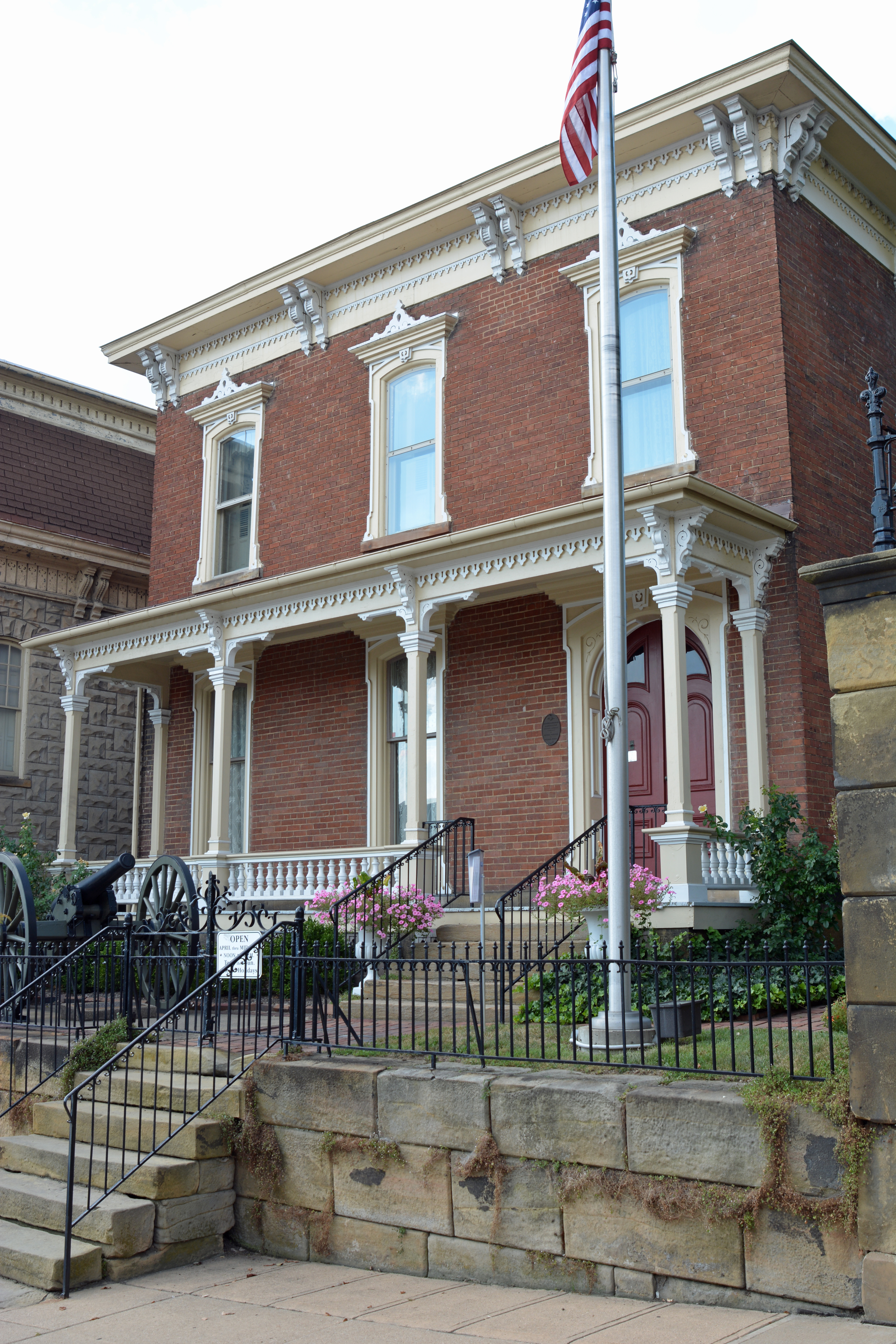
Sherman's childhood home in Lancaster, Ohio

Senator Ewing secured an appointment for the 16-year-old Sherman as a cadet in the United States Military Academy at West Point. Sherman roomed with and befriended another important future Civil War general for the Union, George Henry Thomas. Sherman excelled academically at West Point, but he treated the demerit system with indifference. Fellow cadet William Rosecrans remembered Sherman as "one of the brightest and most popular fellows" at the academy and as "a bright-eyed, red-headed fellow, who was always prepared for a lark of any kind". About his time at West Point, Sherman says only the following in his Memoirs:

At the Academy I was not considered a good soldier, for at no time was I selected for any office, but remained a private throughout the whole four years. Then, as now, neatness in dress and form, with a strict conformity to the rules, were the qualifications required for office, and I suppose I was found not to excel in any of these. In studies I always held a respectable reputation with the professors, and generally ranked among the best, especially in drawing, chemistry, mathematics, and natural philosophy. My average demerits, per annum, were about one hundred and fifty, which reduced my final class standing from number four to six.

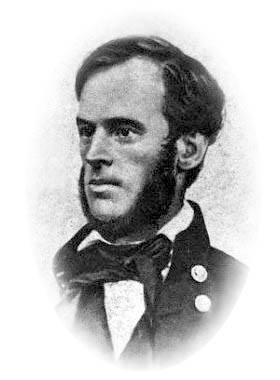
Sherman in military uniform as a youth

Upon graduation in 1840, Sherman entered the army as a second lieutenant in the Third U.S. Artillery and saw action in Florida in the Second Seminole War. In his memoirs he noted that "it was a great pity to remove the Seminoles at all [as Florida] was the Indian's paradise" and still had (at the time that Sherman wrote his memoirs in the 1870s) "a population less than should make a good State". Sherman was later stationed in Georgia and South Carolina. As the foster son of a prominent Whig politician, in Charleston the popular Lieutenant Sherman moved within the upper circles of Old South society.

During the Mexican–American War, Sherman was assigned to administrative duties during the US occupation of California, a Mexican territory, arriving there after most hostilities had ceased, but prior to the Treaty of Guadalupe Hidalgo in February 1848. Along with fellow Lieutenants Henry Halleck and Edward Ord, Sherman embarked from New York City on the 198-day journey around Cape Horn, aboard the converted sloop USS Lexington. During that voyage, Sherman grew close to Ord and especially to the intellectually distinguished Halleck. In his memoirs, Sherman relates a hike with Halleck to the summit of Corcovado, overlooking Rio de Janeiro in Brazil, in order to examine the city's aqueduct design.

Sherman and Ord disembarked in Monterey, California on January 28, 1847, two days before the town of Yerba Buena acquired the new name of "San Francisco". Sherman and Halleck lived in a house in Monterey, now known as the "Sherman Quarters", from 1847 to 1849. In June 1848, Sherman accompanied the military governor of California, Col. Richard Barnes Mason, to inspect the gold mines at Sutter's Fort. Sherman unwittingly helped to launch the California Gold Rush by drafting the official documents in which Governor Mason confirmed that gold had been discovered in the region.

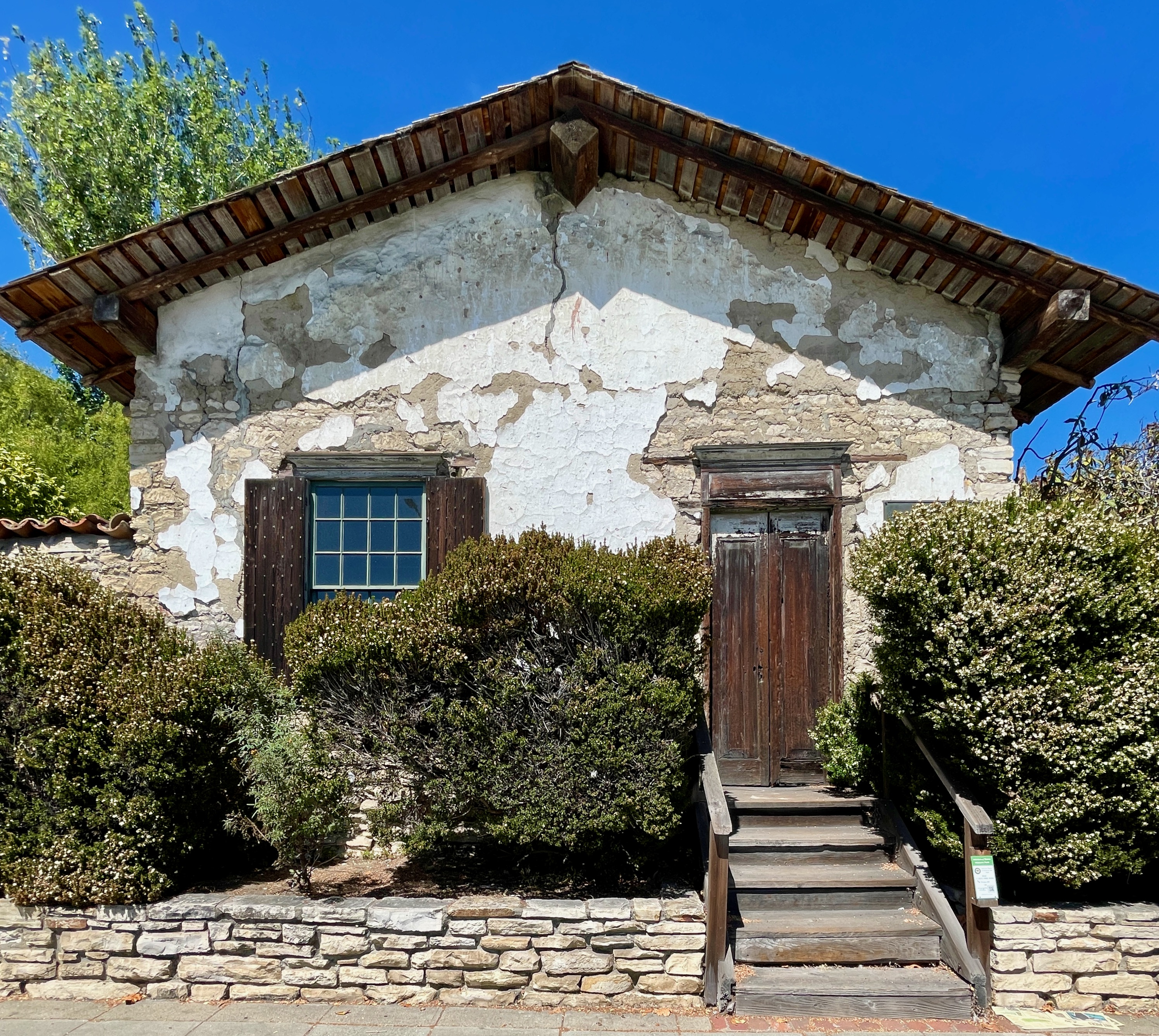
Sherman Quarters at 510 Calle Principal in Monterey, California

At John Augustus Sutter Jr.'s request, Sherman assisted Captain William H. Warner in surveying the new city of Sacramento, laying its street grid in 1848. He also opened a general store in Coloma, which earned him $1,500 in 1849 while his army salary was only $70 a month. Sherman also earned money from surveying and by the sale of lots in Sacramento and Benicia. Even though he earned a brevet promotion to captain in 1848 for his "meritorious service", his lack of combat experience and relatively slow advancement within the army discouraged him. Sherman would eventually become one of the few high-ranking officers of the American Civil War who had not fought in Mexico.

=== Marriage and business career ===
On May 1, 1850, Sherman married his foster sister, Ellen Boyle Ewing, who was four years and eight months his junior. Ellen's father, Thomas Ewing, was the US Secretary of the Interior at that time. Father James A. Ryder, president of Georgetown College, officiated at the Washington, D.C., ceremony. President Zachary Taylor, Vice President Millard Fillmore, and other political luminaries attended the wedding. Ellen Ewing Sherman was a devout Catholic, and the couple's children were reared in that faith.

Their eight children were:

- Maria Ewing ("Minnie") (1851–1913)
- Mary Elizabeth (1852–1925)
- William Tecumseh Jr. ("Willie") (1854–1863)
- Thomas Ewing (1856–1933)
- Eleanor Mary ("Ellie") (1859–1915)
- Rachel Ewing (1861–1919)
- Charles Celestine (1864–1864)
- Philemon Tecumseh (1867–1941)

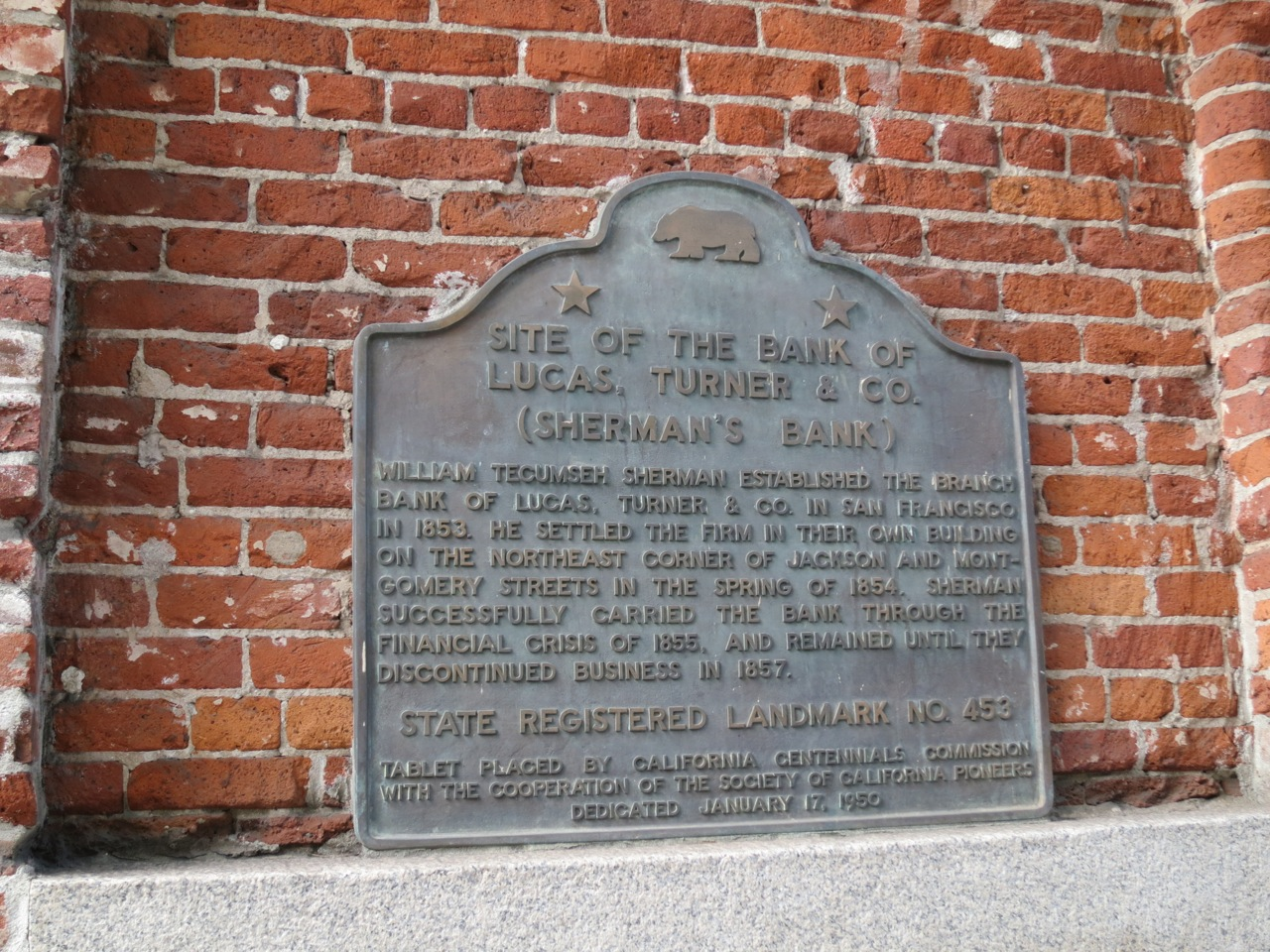
This California Registered Historic Landmark plaque commemorates the location in Jackson Square, San Francisco, which Sherman directed from 1853 to 1857.

Sherman was appointed as captain in the Army's Commissary Department on September 27, 1850, with offices in St. Louis, Missouri. He resigned his commission in 1853 and entered civilian life as manager of the San Francisco branch of the Bank of Lucas, Turner & Co., whose corporate headquarters were in St. Louis. Sherman survived two shipwrecks and floated through the Golden Gate on the overturned hull of a foundering lumber schooner.

Sherman suffered from asthma attacks, which he attributed in part to stress caused by the city's aggressive business culture. Late in life, Sherman said of his time in San Francisco, under frenzied real estate speculation: "I can handle a hundred thousand men in battle, and take the City of the Sun, but am afraid to manage a lot in the swamp of San Francisco."

The failure of Page, Bacon & Co. triggered a panic surrounding the "Black Friday" of February 23, 1855, leading to the closure of several of San Francisco's principal banks and many other businesses. Sherman, however, succeeded in keeping his own bank solvent. In 1856, during the vigilante period, he served briefly as a major general of the California militia.

Sherman's San Francisco branch closed in May 1857, and he relocated to New York City on behalf of the same bank, travelling on the steamer SS Central America. When the bank failed during the Panic of 1857, he closed the New York branch. In early 1858, he returned to California to finalize the bank's outstanding accounts there. (Note: For further details about Sherman's banking career, see Dwight L. Clarke, William Tecumseh Sherman: Gold Rush Banker (San Francisco: California Historical Society, 1969).) Later in 1858, he moved to Leavenworth, Kansas, where he worked as the office manager of the law firm established by his brothers-in-law Hugh Ewing and Thomas Ewing Jr. Sherman obtained a license to practice law, despite not having studied for the bar, but had little success as a lawyer.

=== Military college superintendent ===
In 1859, Sherman accepted a job as the first superintendent of the Louisiana State Seminary of Learning & Military Academy in Pineville, Louisiana, a position he sought at the suggestion of Major Don Carlos Buell and obtained through the support of General George Mason Graham. Sherman was an effective and popular leader of the institution, which would later become Louisiana State University. Colonel Joseph P. Taylor, brother of the late President Zachary Taylor, declared that "if you had hunted the whole Army, from one end of it to the other, you could not have found a man in it more admirably suited for the position in every respect than Sherman."

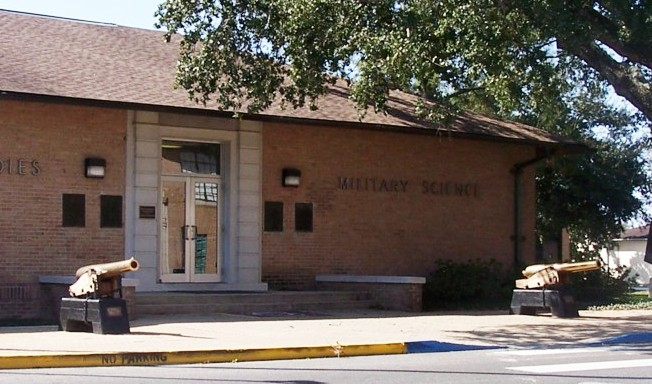
These cannons were used in the Battle of Fort Sumter and procured by Sherman for the university after the Civil War, and are displayed at the Military Science building at Louisiana State University.

Sherman's younger brother John was, from his seat in the U.S. Congress, a prominent advocate against slavery. Before the Civil War, however, the more conservative William had expressed some sympathy for the white Southerners' defense of their traditional agrarian system, including the institution of slavery. On the other hand, he was adamantly opposed to the secession of the southern states. In Louisiana, he became a close friend of professor David French Boyd, a native of Virginia and an enthusiastic secessionist. Boyd later recalled witnessing that, when news of South Carolina's secession from the United States reached them at the Seminary, "Sherman burst out crying, and began, in his nervous way, pacing the floor and deprecating the step which he feared might bring destruction on the whole country." In what some authors have seen as an accurate prophecy of the conflict that would engulf the United States during the next four years, Boyd recalled Sherman declaring:

You people of the South don't know what you are doing. This country will be drenched in blood, and God only knows how it will end. It is all folly, madness, a crime against civilization! You people speak so lightly of war; you don't know what you're talking about. War is a terrible thing! You mistake, too, the people of the North. They are a peaceable people but an earnest people, and they will fight, too. They are not going to let this country be destroyed without a mighty effort to save it ... Besides, where are your men and appliances of war to contend against them? The North can make a steam engine, locomotive, or railway car; hardly a yard of cloth or pair of shoes can you make. You are rushing into war with one of the most powerful, ingeniously mechanical, and determined people on Earth—right at your doors. You are bound to fail. Only in your spirit and determination are you prepared for war. In all else you are totally unprepared, with a bad cause to start with. At first you will make headway, but as your limited resources begin to fail, shut out from the markets of Europe as you will be, your cause will begin to wane. If your people will but stop and think, they must see in the end that you will surely fail.

In January 1861, as more Southern states seceded from the Union, Sherman was required to take receipt of arms surrendered to the Louisiana State Militia by the U.S. arsenal at Baton Rouge. Instead of complying, he resigned his position as superintendent, declaring to the governor of Louisiana that "on no earthly account will I do any act or think any thought hostile to or in defiance of the old Government of the United States."

=== St. Louis interlude ===
Sherman departed Louisiana and traveled to Washington, D.C., possibly in the hope of securing a position in the U.S. Army. At the White House, Sherman met with Abraham Lincoln a few days after his inauguration as president of the United States. Sherman expressed grave concerns about the North's poor state of preparedness for the looming civil war, but he found Lincoln unresponsive.

Sherman then moved to St. Louis to become president of a streetcar company called the Fifth Street Railroad. Thus, he was living in the border state of Missouri as the secession crisis reached its climax. While trying to hold himself aloof from politics, he observed first-hand the efforts of Congressman Frank Blair, who later served under Sherman in the U.S. Army, to keep Missouri in the Union. In early April, Sherman declined Montgomery Blair's offer of the administrative position of chief clerk in the War Department, despite Blair's promise that it would be followed by nomination as Assistant Secretary of War after the U.S. Congress assembled in July.

After the April 12–13 bombardment of Fort Sumter and its subsequent capture by the Confederacy, Sherman hesitated about committing to military service. He privately ridiculed Lincoln's call for 75,000 three-month volunteers to quell secession, reportedly saying: "Why, you might as well attempt to put out the flames of a burning house with a squirt-gun." In May, however, he offered himself for service in the regular Army. Senator John Sherman (his younger brother and a political ally of President Lincoln) and other connections in Washington helped him to obtain a commission. On June 3, he wrote in a letter to his brother-in-law: "I still think it is to be a long war—very long—much longer than any Politician thinks."

== Civil War service ==
=== First commissions and Bull Run ===
Portrait of Sherman by Mathew Brady, c. 1864

Sherman was first commissioned as colonel of the 13th U.S. Infantry Regiment, effective May 14, 1861. This was a new regiment yet to be raised. In fact, Sherman's first command was a brigade of three-month volunteers who fought in the First Battle of Bull Run on July 21, 1861. It was one of the four brigades in the division commanded by General Daniel Tyler, which was in turn one of the five divisions in the Army of Northeastern Virginia under General Irvin McDowell.

The engagement at Bull Run was a disastrous defeat for the Union, dashing hopes for a rapid resolution of the conflict. Sherman was one of the few Union officers to distinguish himself in the field and historian Donald L. Miller has characterized Sherman's performance at Bull Run as "exemplary". During the fighting, Sherman was grazed by bullets in the knee and shoulder. According to British military historian Brian Holden-Reid, "if Sherman had committed tactical errors during the attack, he more than compensated for these during the subsequent retreat". Holden-Reid also concluded that Sherman "might have been as unseasoned as the men he commanded, but he had not fallen prey to the naïve illusions nursed by so many on the field of First Bull Run."

The outcome at Bull Run caused Sherman to question his own judgment as an officer and the capabilities of his volunteer troops. However, Sherman impressed Lincoln during the President's visit to the troops on July 23, and Lincoln promoted Sherman to brigadier general of volunteers effective May 17, 1861. This made Sherman senior in rank to Ulysses S. Grant, his future commander. Sherman was then assigned to serve under Robert Anderson in the Department of the Cumberland, in Louisville, Kentucky. In October, Sherman succeeded Anderson in command of that department. In his memoirs, Sherman would later write that he saw that new assignment as breaking a promise by President Lincoln that he would not be given such a prominent leadership position.

=== Kentucky and breakdown ===
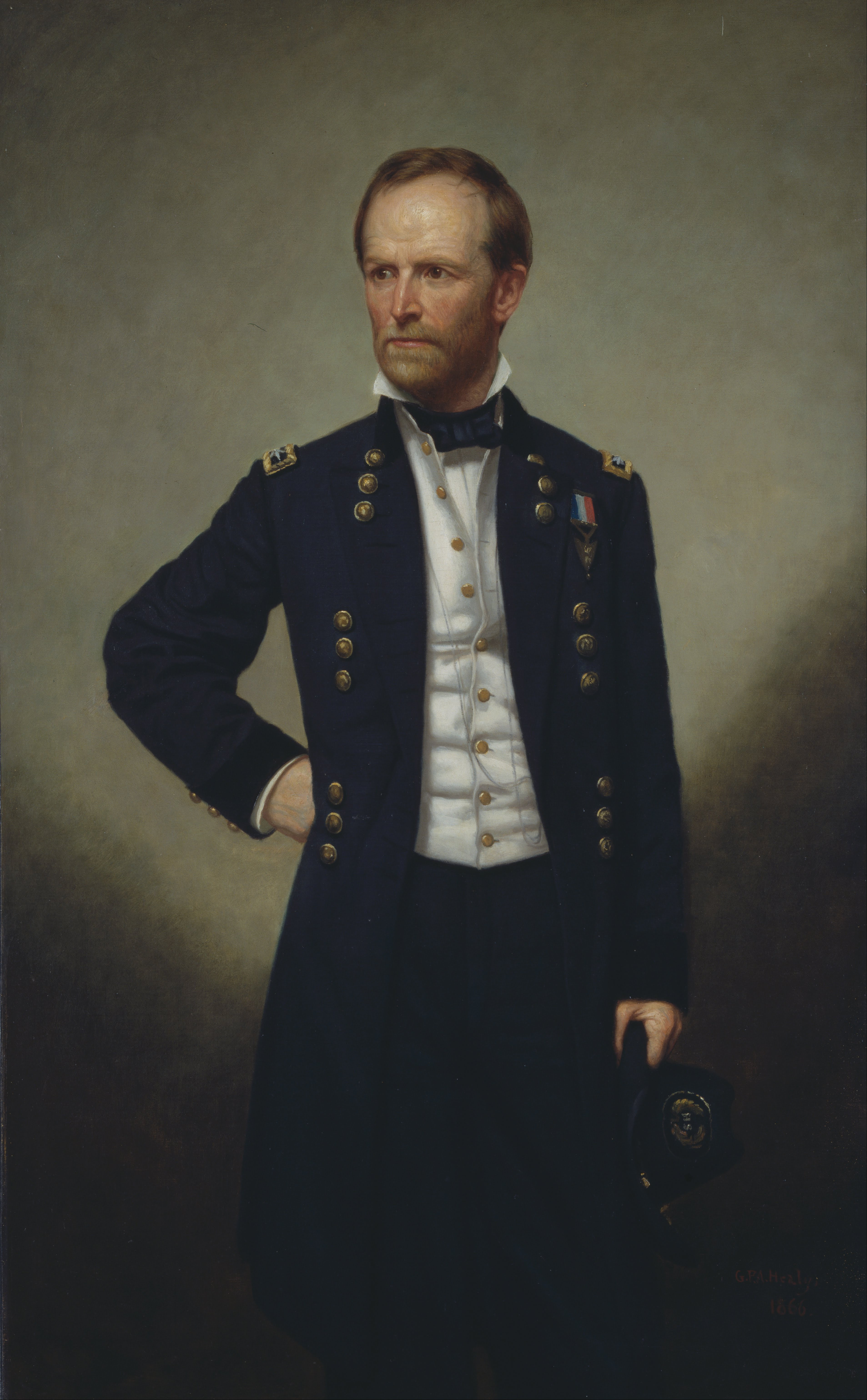
Portrait of William Tecumseh Sherman by George Peter Alexander Healy, 1866

Having succeeded Anderson at Louisville, Sherman now had principal military responsibility for Kentucky, a border state in which the Confederates held Columbus and Bowling Green, and were also present near the Cumberland Gap. (Note: For more detailed discussion of this overall period, see Marszalek, Sherman, pp. 154–167; Hirshson, White Tecumseh, pp. 95–105; Kennett, Sherman, pp. 127–149.) He became exceedingly pessimistic about the outlook for his command and he complained frequently to Washington about shortages, while providing exaggerated estimates of the strength of the rebel forces and requesting inordinate numbers of reinforcements. Critical press reports about Sherman began to appear after the U.S. Secretary of War, Simon Cameron, visited Louisville in October 1861. In early November, Sherman asked to be relieved of his command. He was promptly replaced by Don Carlos Buell and transferred to St. Louis. In December, he was put on leave by Henry W. Halleck, commander of the Department of the Missouri, who found him unfit for duty and sent him to Lancaster, Ohio, to recuperate. While he was at home, his wife Ellen wrote to his brother, Senator John Sherman, seeking advice and complaining of "that melancholy insanity to which your family is subject". In his private correspondence, Sherman later wrote that the concerns of command "broke me down" and admitted to having contemplated suicide. His problems were compounded when the Cincinnati Commercial described him as "insane".

By mid-December 1861 Sherman had recovered sufficiently to return to service under Halleck in the Department of the Missouri. In March, Halleck's command was redesignated the Department of the Mississippi and enlarged to unify command in the West. Sherman's initial assignments were rear-echelon commands, first of an instructional barracks near St. Louis and then in command of the District of Cairo. Operating from Paducah, Kentucky, he provided logistical support for the operations of Grant to capture Fort Donelson in February 1862. Grant, the previous commander of the District of Cairo, had just won a major victory at Fort Henry and been given command of the ill-defined District of West Tennessee. Although Sherman was technically the senior officer, he wrote to Grant, "I feel anxious about you as I know the great facilities [the Confederates] have of concentration by means of the River and R[ail] Road, but [I] have faith in you—Command me in any way."

=== Shiloh ===
After Grant captured Fort Donelson, Sherman got his wish to serve under Grant when he was assigned on March 1, 1862, to the Army of West Tennessee as commander of the 5th Division. His first major test under Grant was at the Battle of Shiloh. The massive Confederate attack on the morning of April 6 took most of the senior Union commanders by surprise. Sherman had dismissed the intelligence reports from militia officers, refusing to believe that Confederate General Albert Sidney Johnston would leave his base at Corinth. He took no precautions beyond strengthening his picket lines, and refused to entrench, build abatis, or send out reconnaissance patrols. At Shiloh, he may have wished to avoid appearing overly alarmed in order to escape the kind of criticism he had received in Kentucky. Indeed, he had written to his wife that if he took more precautions "they'd call me crazy again". Despite being caught unprepared by the attack, Sherman rallied his division and conducted an orderly, fighting retreat that helped avert a disastrous Union rout.

With a heavy rain coming down at the end of the first day of fighting at Shiloh, Sherman came upon Grant standing under a large oak tree, his cigar glowing in the darkness. Heeding, Sherman later said, "some wise and sudden instinct not to mention retreat," he made a noncommittal remark: "Well, Grant, we've had the devil's own day, haven't we?" "Yes," Grant replied, puffing on his cigar. "Lick 'em tomorrow, though."

Sherman proved instrumental to mounting the successful Union counterattack of the following day, April 7. At Shiloh, Sherman was wounded twice—in the hand and shoulder—and had three horses shot out from under him. His performance was praised by Grant and Halleck, and after the battle he was promoted to major general of volunteers, effective May 1. This success contributed greatly to raising Sherman's spirits and changing his personal outlook on the Civil War and his role in it. According to Sherman's biographer Robert O'Connell, "Shiloh marked the turning point of his life."

In late April, a Union force of 100,000 men under Halleck, with Grant relegated to second-in-command, began advancing slowly against Corinth. Sherman commanded the division on the extreme right of the Union's right wing (under George Henry Thomas). Shortly after the Union forces occupied Corinth on May 30, Sherman persuaded Grant not to resign his command, despite the serious difficulties he was having with Halleck. Sherman offered Grant an example from his own life: "Before the battle of Shiloh, I was cast down by a mere newspaper assertion of 'crazy', but that single battle gave me new life, and I'm now in high feather." He told Grant that, if he remained in the army, "some happy accident might restore you to favor and your true place". In July, Grant's situation improved when Halleck left for the East to become general-in-chief. Sherman then became the military governor of occupied Memphis.

=== Vicksburg ===
In November 1862, Grant, acting as commander of the Union forces in the state of Mississippi, launched a campaign to capture the city of Vicksburg, the principal Confederate stronghold along the Mississippi River. Grant made Sherman a corps commander and put him in charge of half of his forces. According to historian John D. Winters's The Civil War in Louisiana (1963), at this stage Sherman

...had yet to display any marked talents for leadership. Sherman, beset by hallucinations and unreasonable fears and finally contemplating suicide, had been relieved from command in Kentucky. He later began a new climb to success at Shiloh and Corinth under Grant. Still, if he muffed his Vicksburg assignment, which had begun unfavorably, he would rise no higher. As a man, Sherman was an eccentric mixture of strength and weakness. Although he was impatient, often irritable and depressed, petulant, headstrong, and unreasonably gruff, he had solid soldierly qualities. His men swore by him, and most of his fellow officers admired him.

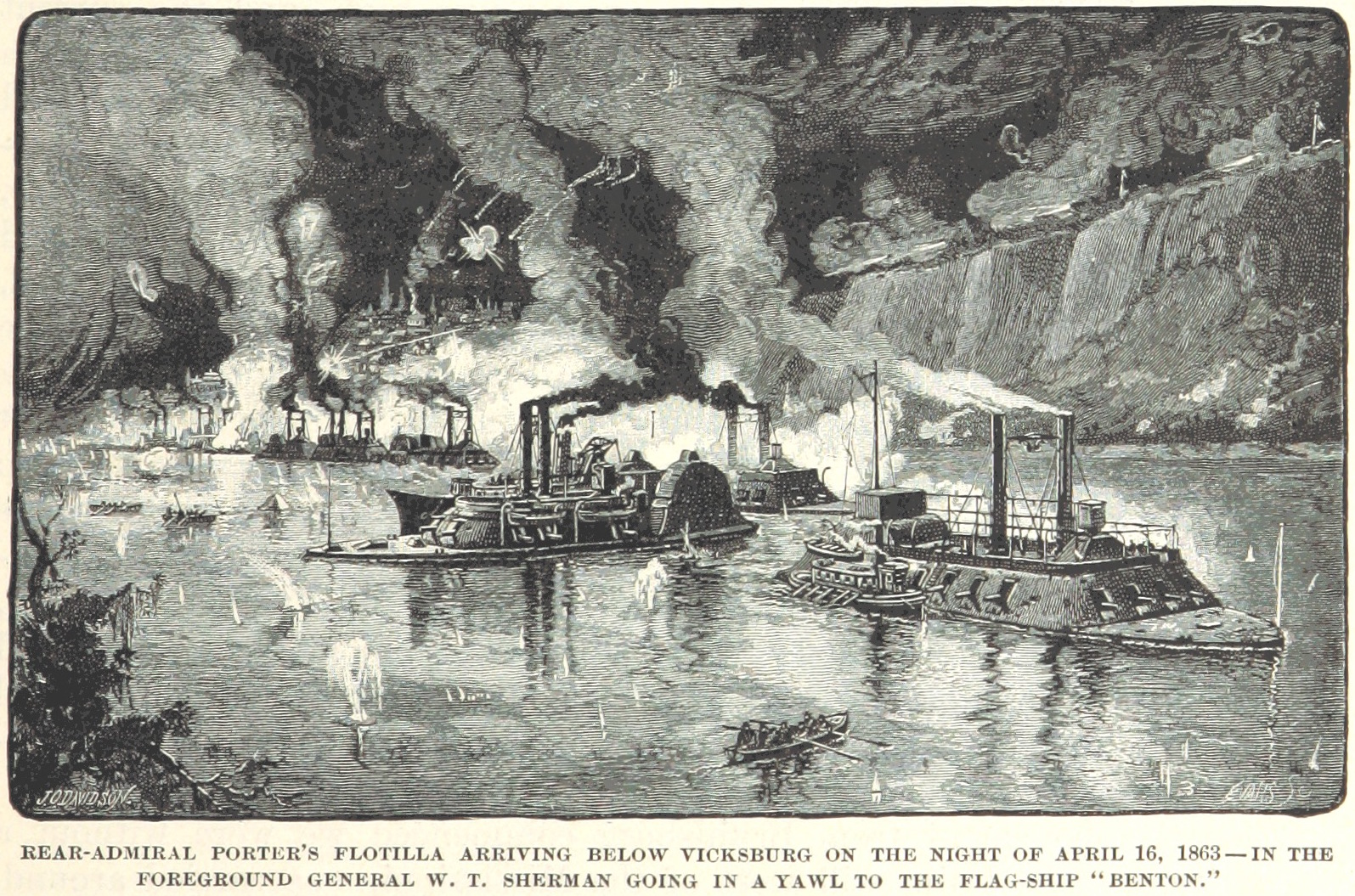
The engraving depicts Admiral Porter's flotilla of gunships and transports arriving below Vicksburg on April 16, 1863, with General Sherman rowing a yawl to the USS Benton.

In December, Sherman's forces suffered a severe repulse at the Battle of Chickasaw Bayou, just north of Vicksburg. Sherman's operations were supposed to be coordinated with an advance on Vicksburg by Grant from another direction. Unbeknownst to Sherman, Grant abandoned his advance, and Sherman's river expedition met more resistance than expected. Soon after, Major General John A. McClernand ordered Sherman's XV Corps to join in his assault on Arkansas Post. Grant, who was on poor terms with McClernand, regarded this as a politically motivated distraction from the efforts to take Vicksburg, but Sherman had targeted Arkansas Post independently and considered the operation worthwhile. Arkansas Post was taken by the Union army and navy on January 11, 1863.

The failure of the first phase of the campaign against Vicksburg led Grant to formulate an unorthodox new strategy, which called for the invading Union army to leave its supply train and subsist by foraging. Sherman initially expressed reservations about the wisdom of these plans, but he soon submitted to Grant's leadership and the campaign in the spring of 1863 cemented Sherman's personal ties to Grant. The bulk of Grant's forces were now organized into three corps: the XIII Corps under McClernand, the XV Corps under Sherman, and the XVII Corps under Sherman's young protégé, Maj. Gen. James B. McPherson. During the long and complicated maneuvers against Vicksburg, one newspaper complained that the "army was being ruined in mud-turtle expeditions, under the leadership of a drunkard [Grant], whose confidential adviser [Sherman] was a lunatic". When Vicksburg fell on July 4, 1863, after a prolonged siege, the Union had achieved a major strategic victory, putting navigation along the Mississippi River entirely under Union control and effectively cutting off the western half of the Confederacy from the eastern half.

During the siege of Vicksburg, Confederate General Joseph E. Johnston had gathered a force of 30,000 men in Jackson, Mississippi, with the intention of relieving the garrison under the command of John C. Pemberton that was trapped inside Vicksburg. After Pemberton surrendered to Grant on July 4, Johnston advanced toward the rear of Grant's forces. In response to this threat, Grant instructed Sherman to attack Johnston. Sherman conducted the ensuing Jackson Expedition, which concluded successfully on July 25 with the re-capture of the city of Jackson. This helped ensure that the Mississippi River would remain in Union hands for the remainder of the war. According to Holden-Reid, Sherman finally "had cut his teeth as an army commander" with the Jackson Expedition.

=== Chattanooga ===
Map of the Battles for Chattanooga in 1863

After the surrender of Vicksburg and the re-capture of Jackson, Sherman was given the rank of brigadier general in the regular army, in addition to his rank as a major general of volunteers. His family traveled from Ohio to visit him at the camp near Vicksburg. Sherman's nine-year-old son, Willie, the "Little Sergeant", died from typhoid fever contracted during the trip.

Ordered to relieve the Union forces besieged in the city of Chattanooga, Tennessee, Sherman departed from Memphis on October 11, 1863, aboard a train bound for Chattanooga. When Sherman's train passed Collierville it came under attack by 3,000 Confederate cavalry and eight guns under James Ronald Chalmers. Sherman took command of the infantrymen in the local Union garrison and successfully repelled the Confederate attack. Following the defeat of the Army of the Cumberland at the Battle of Chickamauga by Confederate general Braxton Bragg's Army of Tennessee, President Lincoln re-organized the Union forces in the West as the Military Division of the Mississippi, placing it under General Grant's command. Sherman then succeeded Grant at the head of the Army of the Tennessee.

At Chattanooga, Grant instructed Sherman to attack the right flank of Bragg's forces, which were entrenched along Missionary Ridge overlooking the city. On November 25, Sherman took his assigned target of Billy Goat Hill at the north end of the ridge, only to find that it was separated from the main spine by a rock-strewn ravine. When he attempted to attack the main spine at Tunnel Hill, his troops were repeatedly repelled by Patrick Cleburne's heavy division, the best unit in Bragg's army. Grant then ordered Thomas to attack the center of the Confederate line. This frontal assault was intended as a diversion, but it unexpectedly succeeded in capturing the enemy's entrenchments and routing the Confederate Army of Tennessee, bringing the Union's Chattanooga campaign to a successful completion.

After Chattanooga, Sherman led a column to relieve Union forces under Ambrose Burnside, thought to be in peril at Knoxville. In February 1864, he commanded an expedition to Meridian, Mississippi, intended to disrupt Confederate infrastructure and communications. Sherman's army captured the city of Meridian on February 14 and proceeded to destroy 105 miles of railroad and 61 bridges, while burning at least 10 locomotives and 28 railcars. The army took 4,000 prisoners and commandeered many wagons and horses. Sherman was formally Thanked by Congress for his services on February 19. Thousands of refugees, both black and white, joined Sherman's columns, which on February 20 finally withdrew toward Canton.

=== Atlanta ===
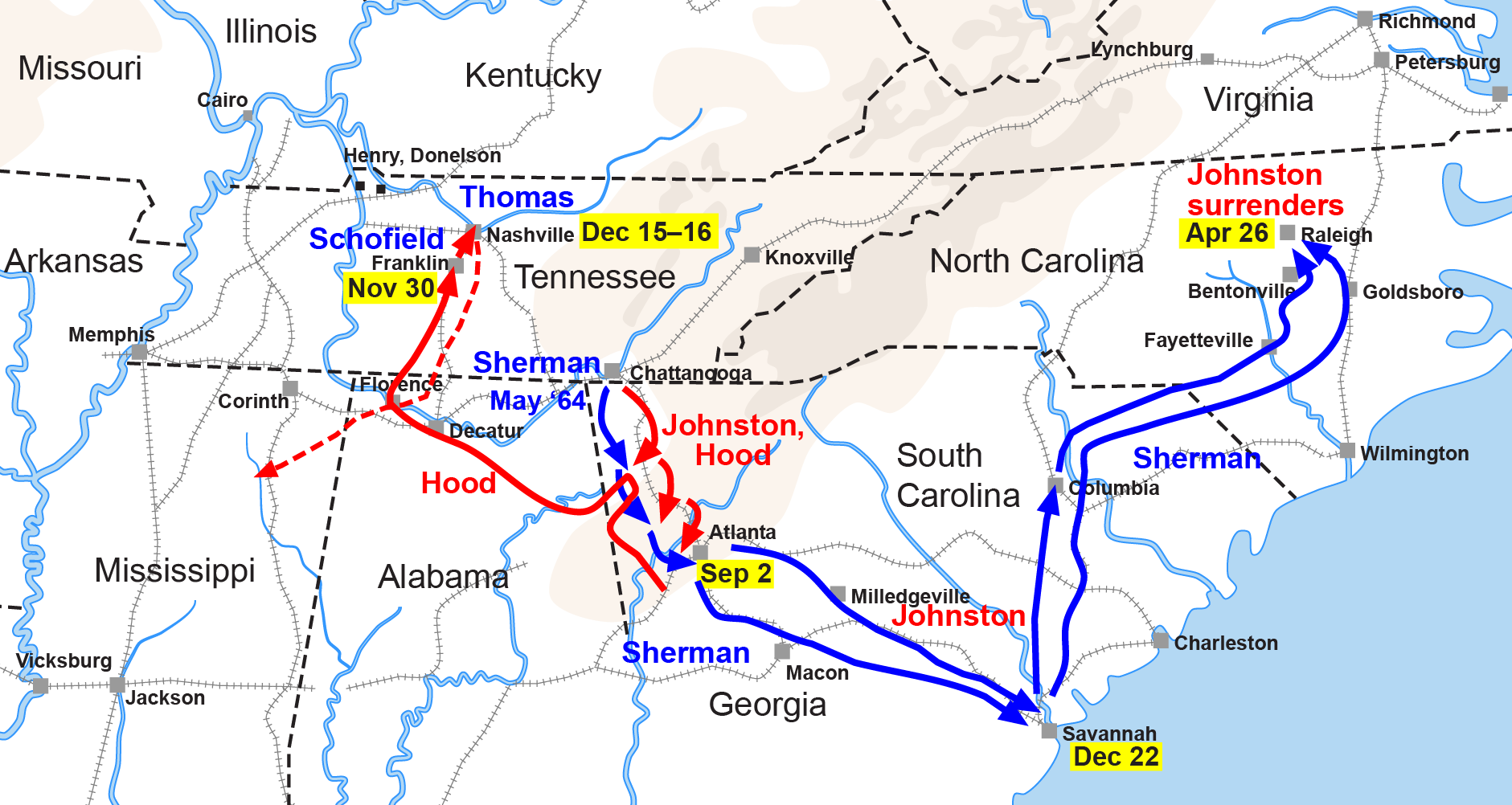
Map of Sherman's campaigns in Georgia and the Carolinas in 1864 and 1865

The Meridian campaign marked the end of Sherman's brief tenure as commander of the Army of the Tennessee. Sherman had, up to that point, achieved mixed success as a general, and controversy attached especially to his performance at Chattanooga. However, he enjoyed Grant's confidence and friendship. When Lincoln called Grant east in the spring of 1864 to take command of all the Union armies, Grant appointed Sherman (by then known to his soldiers as "Uncle Billy") to succeed him as head of the Military Division of the Mississippi, which entailed command of Union troops in the western theater of the war. As Grant took overall command of the armies of the United States, Sherman wrote to him outlining his strategy to bring the war to an end: "If you can whip Lee and I can march to the Atlantic I think ol' Uncle Abe [Lincoln] will give us twenty days leave to see the young folks."

Sherman proceeded to invade the state of Georgia with three armies: the 60,000-strong Army of the Cumberland under Thomas, the 25,000-strong Army of the Tennessee under James B. McPherson, and the 13,000-strong Army of the Ohio under John M. Schofield. He conducted a series of flanking maneuvers through rugged terrain against Confederate general Joseph E. Johnston's Army of Tennessee, attempting a direct assault only at the Battle of Kennesaw Mountain. The Confederate victory at Kennesaw Mountain did little to halt Sherman's advance toward Atlanta. In July, the cautious Johnston was replaced by the more aggressive John Bell Hood, who played to Sherman's strength by challenging him to direct battles on open ground. Meanwhile, in August, Sherman "learned that I had been commissioned a major-general in the regular army, which was unexpected, and not desired until successful in the capture of Atlanta". (Note: The nomination was not submitted to the Senate until December.)

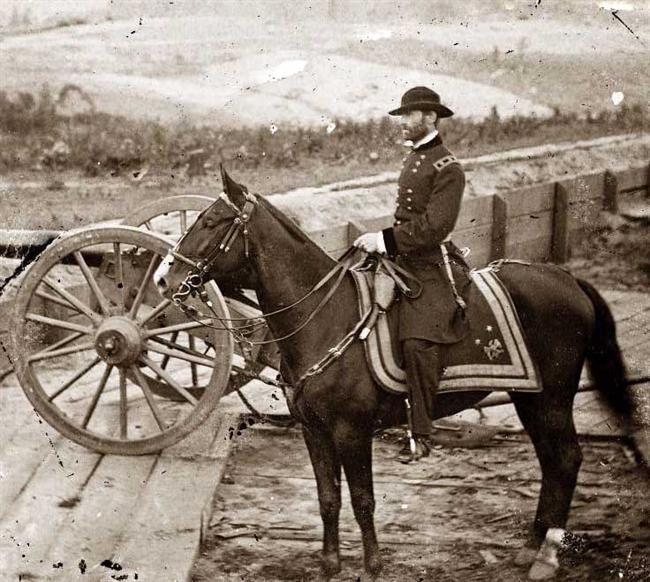
Sherman on horseback at Federal Fort No. 7, after the Atlanta campaign in September 1864

Sherman's Atlanta campaign concluded successfully on September 2, 1864, with the capture of the city, which Hood had been forced to abandon. After ordering almost all civilians to abandon the city in September, Sherman gave instructions that all military and government buildings in Atlanta be burned, although many private homes and shops were burned as well. The capture of Atlanta made Sherman a household name and was decisive in ensuring Lincoln's re-election in November. Sherman's success caused the collapse of the once powerful "Copperhead" faction within the Democratic Party, which had advocated immediate peace negotiations with the Confederacy. It also dealt a major blow to the popularity of the Democratic presidential candidate, George B. McClellan, whose victory in the election had until then appeared likely to many, including Lincoln himself. According to Holden-Reid, "Sherman did more than any other man apart from the president in creating [the] climate of opinion" that afforded Lincoln a comfortable victory over McClellan at the polls.

=== March to the Sea ===
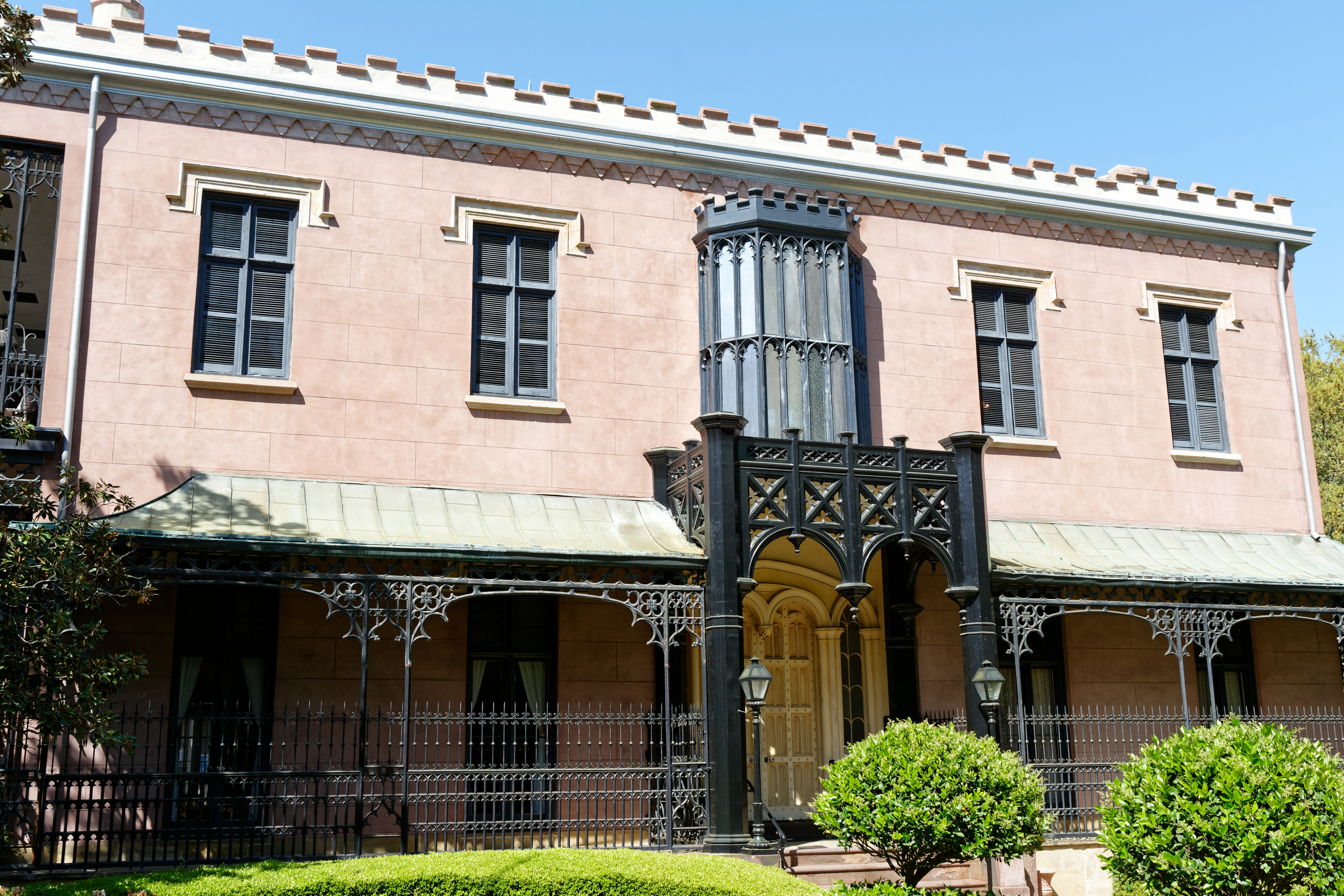
Green–Meldrim House was Sherman's headquarters after his capture of Savannah, in December 1864.

During September and October, Sherman and Hood played a cat-and-mouse game in northern Georgia and Alabama, as Hood threatened Sherman's communications to the north. Eventually, Sherman won approval from his superiors for a plan to cut loose from his communications and march south, having advised Grant that he could "make Georgia howl". In response, Hood moved north into Tennessee. Sherman at first trivialized the corresponding threat, reportedly saying that he would "give [Hood] his rations" to go in that direction, as "my business is down south". Sherman left forces under Major Generals George H. Thomas and John M. Schofield to deal with Hood; their forces eventually smashed Hood's army in the battles of Franklin (November 30) and Nashville (December 15–16).

After the November elections, Sherman began marching on November 15 with 62,000 men in the direction of the port city of Savannah, Georgia, living off the land and causing, by his own estimate, more than $100 million in property damage. At the end of this campaign, known as Sherman's March to the Sea, his troops took Savannah on December 21. Upon reaching Savannah, Sherman appointed Private A. O. Granger as his personal secretary. Sherman then dispatched a message to Lincoln, offering him the city as a Christmas present. (Note: This message was put on a vessel on December 22, passed on by telegram from Fort Monroe, Virginia, and apparently received by Lincoln on Christmas Day itself. See also Official Records, Series I, vol. 44, 783; New York Times, December 26, 1864 Archived February 16, 2017, at the Wayback Machine)

Sherman's success in Georgia received ample coverage in the Northern press at a time when Grant seemed to be making little progress in his fight against General Robert E. Lee's Army of Northern Virginia. A bill was introduced in Congress to promote Sherman to Grant's rank of lieutenant general, probably with a view toward having him replace Grant as commander of the Union Army. Sherman wrote both to his brother, Senator John Sherman, and to General Grant vehemently repudiating any such promotion. According to a war-time account, it was around this time Sherman made his memorable declaration of loyalty to Grant:

General Grant is a great general. I know him well. He stood by me when I was crazy, and I stood by him when he was drunk; and now, sir, we stand by each other always.

While in Savannah, Sherman learned from a newspaper that his infant son Charles Celestine had died during the Savannah campaign; the general had never seen the child.

=== Final campaigns in the Carolinas ===
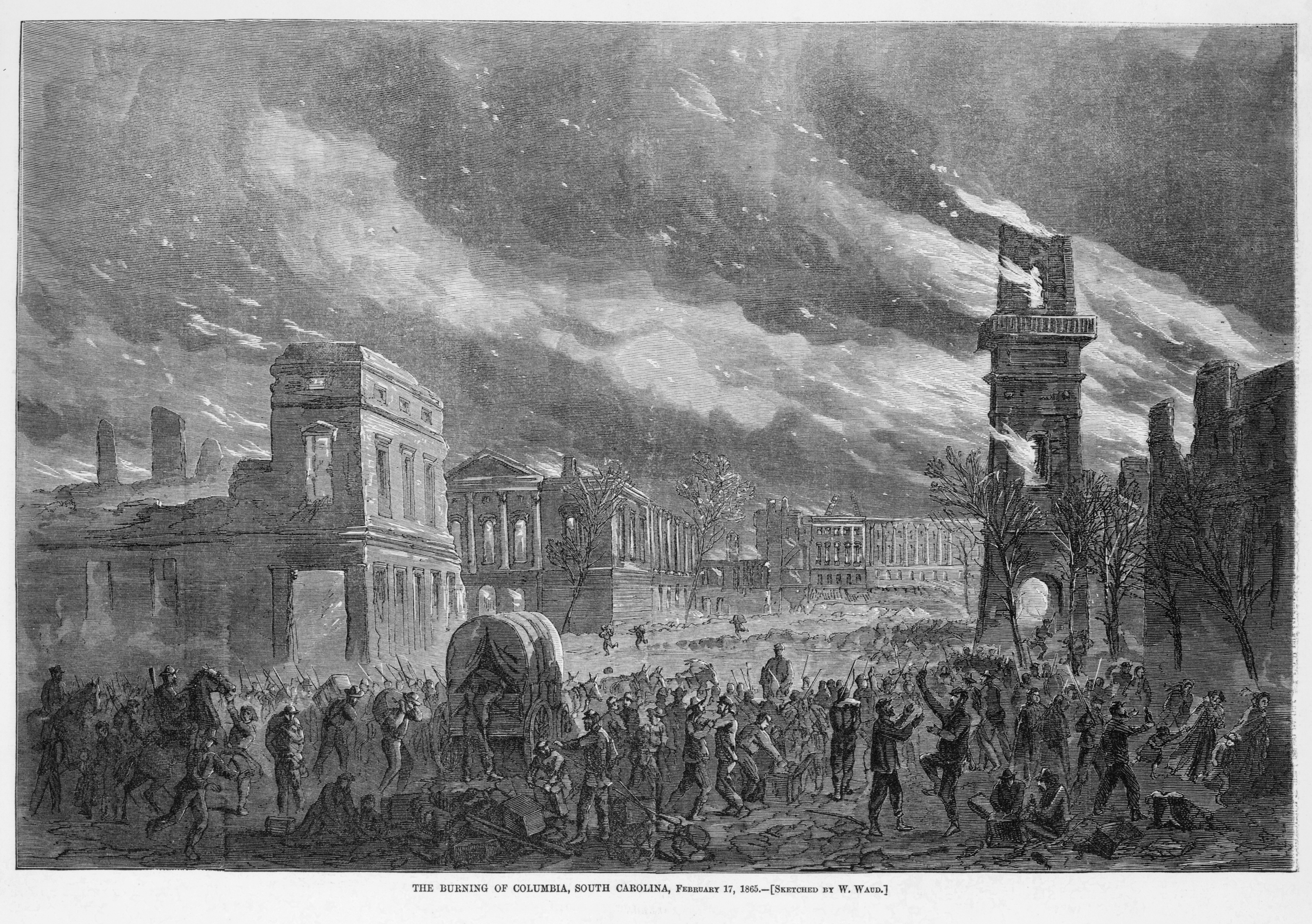
The Burning of Columbia, South Carolina is an 1865 illustration by William Waud for Harper's Weekly

Grant then ordered Sherman to embark his army on steamers and join the Union forces confronting Lee in Virginia, but Sherman instead persuaded Grant to allow him to march north through the Carolinas, destroying everything of military value along the way, as he had done in Georgia. He was particularly interested in targeting South Carolina, the first state to secede from the Union, because of the effect that it would have on Southern morale. His army proceeded north through South Carolina against light resistance from the troops of General Johnston. Upon hearing that Sherman's men were advancing on corduroy roads through the Salkehatchie swamps at a rate of a dozen miles per day, Johnston "made up his mind that there had been no such army in existence since the days of Julius Caesar".

Sherman was again formally Thanked by Congress on January 10, 1865.

Sherman captured Columbia, the state capital, on February 17, 1865. Fires began that night and by next morning most of the central city was destroyed. The burning of Columbia has engendered controversy ever since, with some claiming the fires were a deliberate act of vengeance by the Union troops and others that the fires were accidental, caused in part by the burning bales of cotton that the retreating Confederates left behind them.

Local Native American Lumbee guides helped Sherman's army cross the Lumber River, which was flooded by torrential rains, into North Carolina. According to Sherman, the trek across the Lumber River and through the swamps, pocosins, and creeks of Robeson County was "the damnedest marching I ever saw". Thereafter, his troops did relatively little damage to the civilian infrastructure. North Carolina, unlike its southern neighbor, was regarded by the Union troops as a reluctant Confederate state, having been second from last to secede from the Union, ahead only of Tennessee.

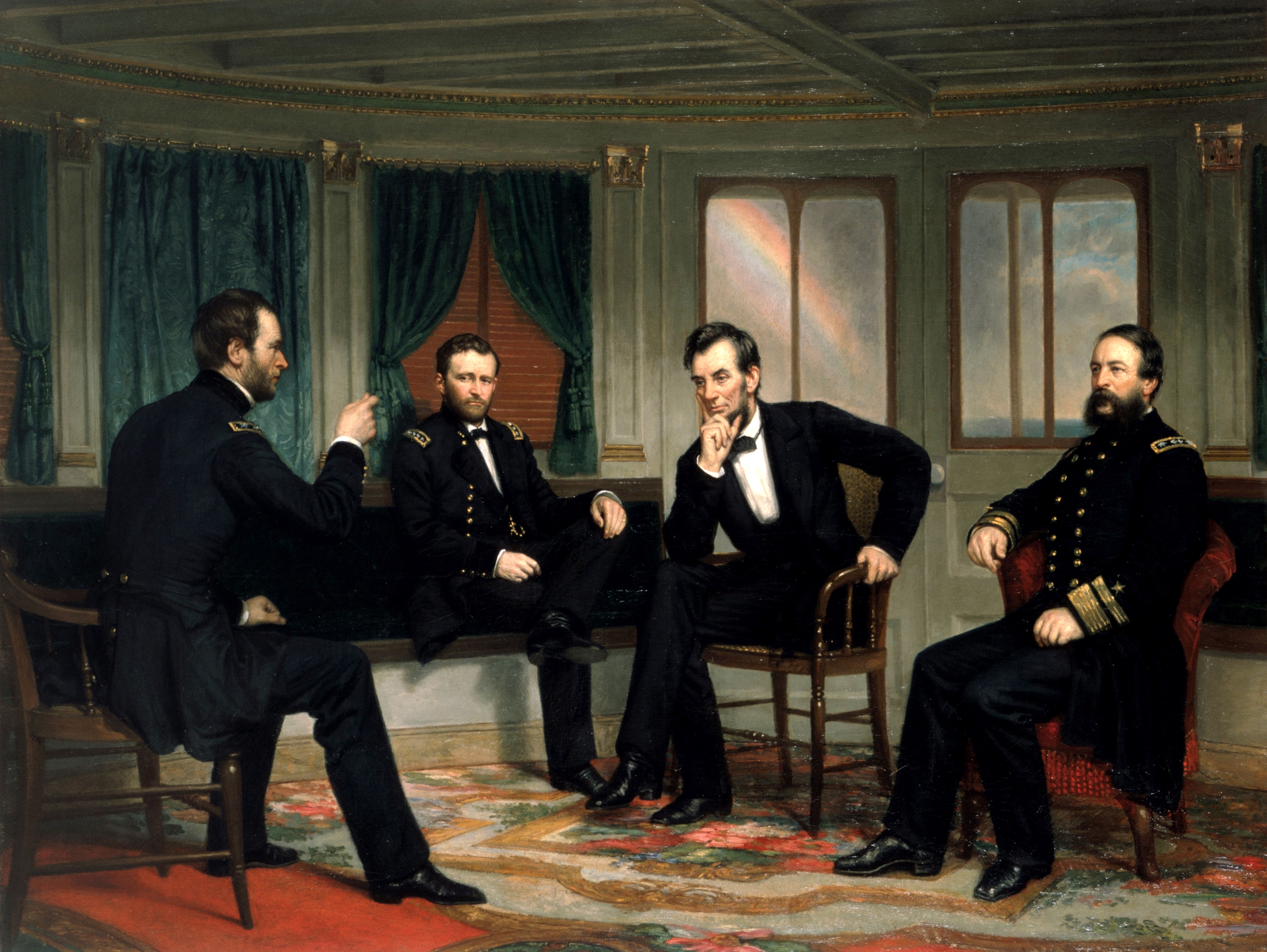
This 1868 oil portrait of Sherman, Grant, Lincoln, and Porter meeting aboard the River Queen on March 27, 1865, near City Point, Virginia, The Peacemakers by G. P. A. Healy, is displayed in the White House.

The only general engagement during Sherman's marches through Georgia and the Carolinas, the Battle of Bentonville, took place on March 19–21. Having defeated the Confederate forces under Johnston at Bentonville, Sherman proceeded to rendezvous at Goldsboro with the Union troops that awaited him there after the captures of the coastal cities of New Bern and Wilmington.

In late March, Sherman briefly left his forces and traveled to City Point, Virginia, to confer with Grant. Lincoln happened to be at City Point at the same time, making possible the only three-way meeting of Lincoln, Grant, and Sherman during the war. Also present at the City Point conference was Rear Admiral David Dixon Porter. This meeting was memorialized in G. P. A. Healy's painting The Peacemakers. After returning to Goldsboro, Sherman marched to the state capital, Raleigh, where Sherman sought to communicate with Johnston's army regarding possible terms for ending the war. He seized the Governor's Palace in April 1865. On April 9, Sherman relayed to his troops the news that Lee had surrendered to Grant at Appomattox Court House and that the Confederate Army of Northern Virginia had ceased to exist.

=== Confederate surrender ===
Following Lee's surrender and the assassination of Lincoln on April 14, 1865, Sherman met with Johnston on April 17 at Bennett Place in Durham, North Carolina, to negotiate a Confederate surrender. At the insistence of Johnston, Confederate President Jefferson Davis, and Secretary of War John C. Breckinridge, Sherman conditionally agreed to generous terms that dealt with both military and political issues. On April 20, Sherman dispatched a memorandum with those terms to the government in Washington.

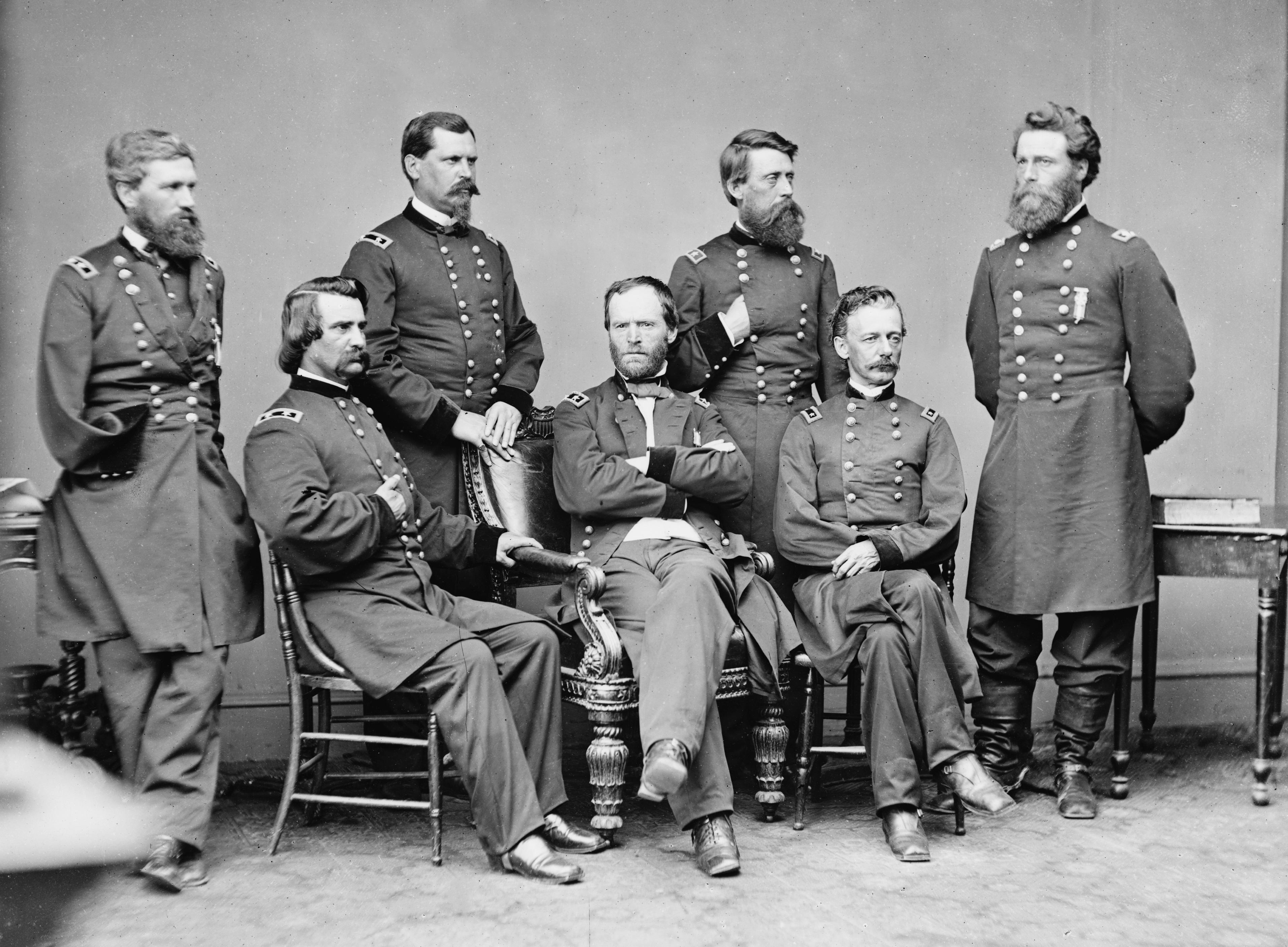
Sherman with Howard, Logan, Hazen, Davis, Slocum, and Mower, photographed by Mathew Brady, May 1865

Sherman believed that the terms that he had agreed to were consistent with the views that Lincoln had expressed at City Point, and that they offered the best way to prevent Johnston from ordering his men to go into the wilderness and conduct a destructive guerrilla campaign. However, Sherman had proceeded without authority from Grant, the newly installed President Andrew Johnson, or the Cabinet. The assassination of Lincoln had caused the political climate in Washington to turn against the prospect of a rapid reconciliation with the defeated Confederates, and the Johnson administration rejected Sherman's terms. Grant may have had to intervene to save Sherman from dismissal for having overstepped his authority. The U.S. Secretary of War, Edwin M. Stanton, leaked Sherman's memorandum to The New York Times, intimating that Sherman might have been bribed to allow Davis to escape capture by the Union troops. This precipitated a deep and long-lasting enmity between Sherman and Stanton, and it intensified Sherman's disdain for politicians.

Grant then offered Johnston purely military terms, similar to those that he had negotiated with Lee at Appomattox. Johnston, ignoring instructions from President Davis, accepted those terms on April 26, 1865, formally surrendered his army and all the Confederate forces in the Carolinas, Georgia, and Florida. This was the largest single capitulation of the war. Sherman proceeded with some of his troops to Washington, where they marched in the Grand Review of the Armies on May 24.

== Slavery and emancipation ==
Portrait of Sherman by Mathew Brady, c. 1869–1880

Sherman was not an abolitionist before the war and, like others of his time and background, he did not believe in "Negro equality". Before the war, Sherman expressed some sympathy with the view of Southern whites that the black race was benefiting from slavery, although he opposed breaking up slave families and advocated that laws forbidding the education of slaves be repealed. Throughout the Civil War, Sherman declined to employ black troops in his armies.

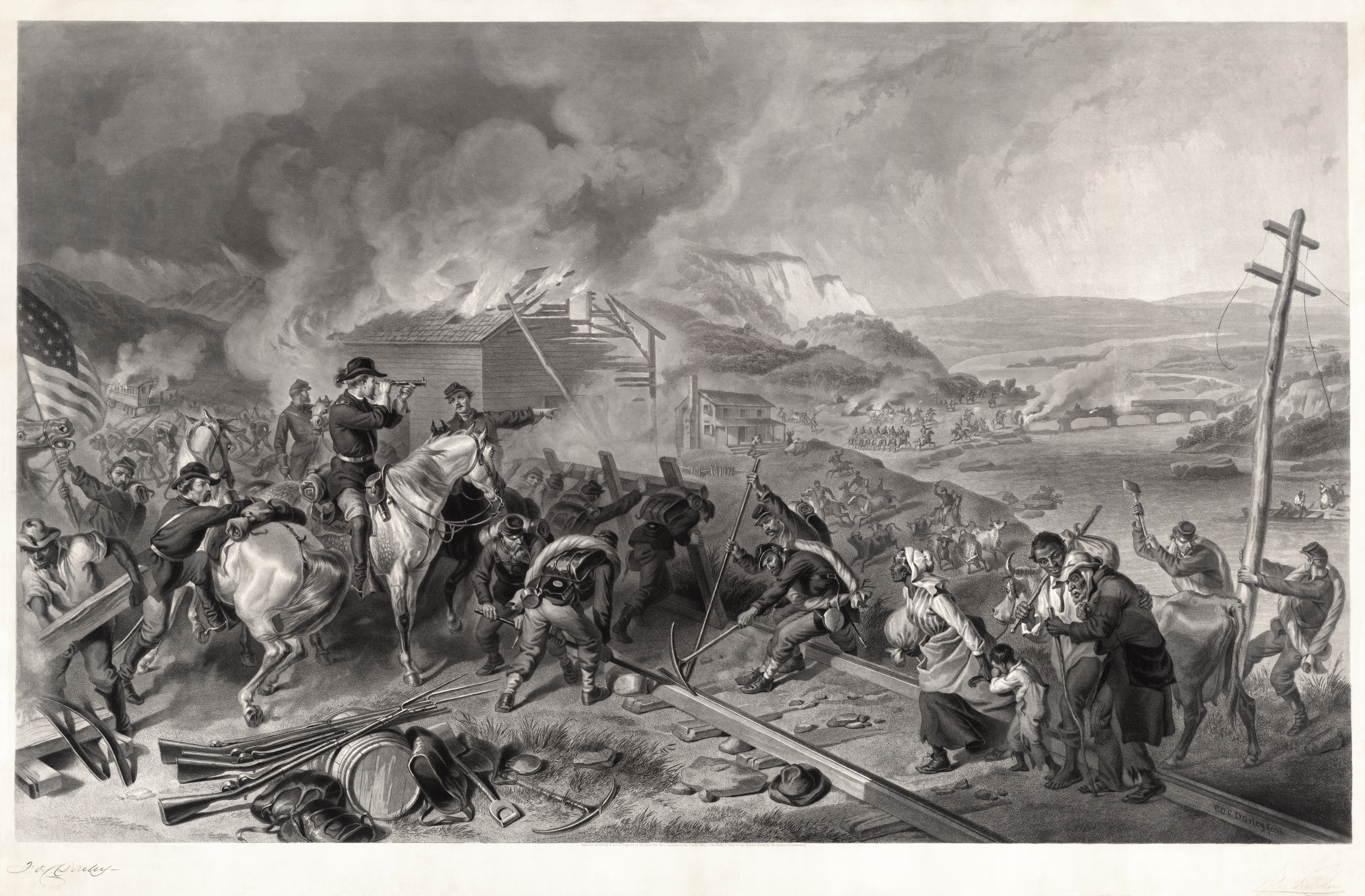
An 1868 engraving by Alexander Hay Ritchie depicts Sherman's March to the Sea with Sherman on the left astride his horse surveying the scene through a hand-held spotting scope as a family of freed slaves approaches him from the right and another freedman on the left carries away a railroad tie.

In his Memoirs, Sherman commented on the political pressures of 1864–1865 to encourage the escape of slaves, in part to avoid the possibility that "able-bodied slaves will be called into the military service of the rebels". Sherman rejected this, arguing that it would have delayed the "successful end" of the war and the "[liberation of] all slaves". According to Sherman:

My aim then was to whip the rebels, to humble their pride, to follow them to their inmost recesses, and make them fear and dread us. "Fear of the Lord is the beginning of wisdom." I did not want them to cast in our teeth what General Hood had once done at Atlanta, that we had to call on their slaves to help us to subdue them.

Tens of thousands of escaped slaves nonetheless joined Sherman's marches through Georgia and the Carolinas as refugees. Their fate soon became a pressing military and political issue. Some abolitionists accused Sherman of doing too little to alleviate the precarious living conditions of these refugees, motivating Secretary of War Stanton to travel to Georgia in January 1865 to investigate the situation. On January 12, Sherman and Stanton met in Savannah with twenty local black leaders, most of them Baptist or Methodist ministers, invited by Sherman. According to historian Eric Foner, "the 'Colloquy' between Sherman, Stanton, and the black leaders offered a rare lens through which the experience of slavery and the aspirations that would help to shape Reconstruction came into sharp focus."

After Sherman's departure the spokesman for the black leaders, Baptist minister Garrison Frazier, declared in response to Stanton's inquiry about the feelings of the black community:

We looked upon General Sherman prior to his arrival as a man in the providence of God specially set apart to accomplish this work, and we unanimously feel inexpressible gratitude to him, looking upon him as a man that should be honored for the faithful performance of his duty. Some of us called upon him immediately upon his arrival, and it is probable he would not meet the Secretary [Stanton] with more courtesy than he met us. His conduct and deportment toward us characterized him as a friend and a gentleman.

Four days later, Sherman issued his Special Field Orders, No. 15. The orders provided for the settlement of 40,000 freed slaves and black refugees on land expropriated from white landowners in South Carolina, Georgia, and Florida. Sherman appointed Brig. Gen. Rufus Saxton, an abolitionist from Massachusetts who had previously directed the recruitment of black soldiers, to implement that plan. Those orders, which became the basis of the claim that the Union government had promised freed slaves "forty acres and a mule", were revoked later that year by President Johnson.

Toward the end of the Civil War, some elements within the Republican Party regarded Sherman as being strongly prejudiced against black people. Sherman's views on race evolved significantly over time. He dealt in a friendly and unaffected way with the black people that he met during his career. In 1888, near the end of his life, Sherman published an essay in the North American Review defending the full civil rights of black citizens in the former Confederacy. In that essay, Sherman called upon the South to "let the negro vote, and count his vote honestly", adding that "otherwise, so sure as there is a God in Heaven, you will have another war, more cruel than the last, when the torch and dagger will take the place of the muskets of well-ordered battalions".

== Strategies ==
Sherman advanced from Atlanta to Goldsboro, North Carolina.

Sherman's military legacy rests primarily on his command of logistics and on his brilliance as a strategist. The influential 20th-century British military historian and theorist B. H. Liddell Hart ranked Sherman as "the first modern general" and one of the most important strategists in the annals of war, along with Scipio Africanus, Belisarius, Napoleon Bonaparte, T. E. Lawrence, and Erwin Rommel. Liddell Hart's views on the historical significance of Sherman have since been discussed and, to varying extents, defended by subsequent military scholars such as Jay Luvaas, Victor Davis Hanson, and Brian Holden-Reid.

=== Maneuver warfare ===
Liddell Hart credited Sherman with mastery of maneuver warfare, also known as the "indirect approach". In maneuver warfare, a commander seeks to defeat the enemy on the battleground through shock, disruption, and surprise, while minimizing frontal attacks on well-defended positions. According to Liddell Hart, this strategy was most clearly illustrated by Sherman's series of turning movements against Johnston during the Atlanta campaign. Liddell Hart also declared that the study of Sherman's campaigns had contributed significantly to his own "theory of strategy and tactics in mechanized warfare", and claimed that this had in turn influenced Heinz Guderian's doctrine of Blitzkrieg and Rommel's use of tanks during the Second World War. (Note: Liddell Hart's claims for his own influence on the German doctrine of Blitzkrieg and on the German use of tanks in World War II, as well as his relations with leaders of the Wehrmacht after the war's end, have attracted criticism and controversy. See, e.g., "Hart, Sir Basil Henry Liddell". Oxford Dictionary of National Biography (online ed.). Oxford University Press. doi:10.1093/ref:odnb/33737. (Subscription, Wikipedia Library access or UK public library membership required.).) Another World War II-era student of Liddell Hart's writings on Sherman was General George S. Patton, who "spent a long vacation studying Sherman's campaigns on the ground in Georgia and the Carolinas, with the aid of [Liddell Hart's] book" and later "carried out his [bold] plans, in super-Sherman style".

=== Hard war ===
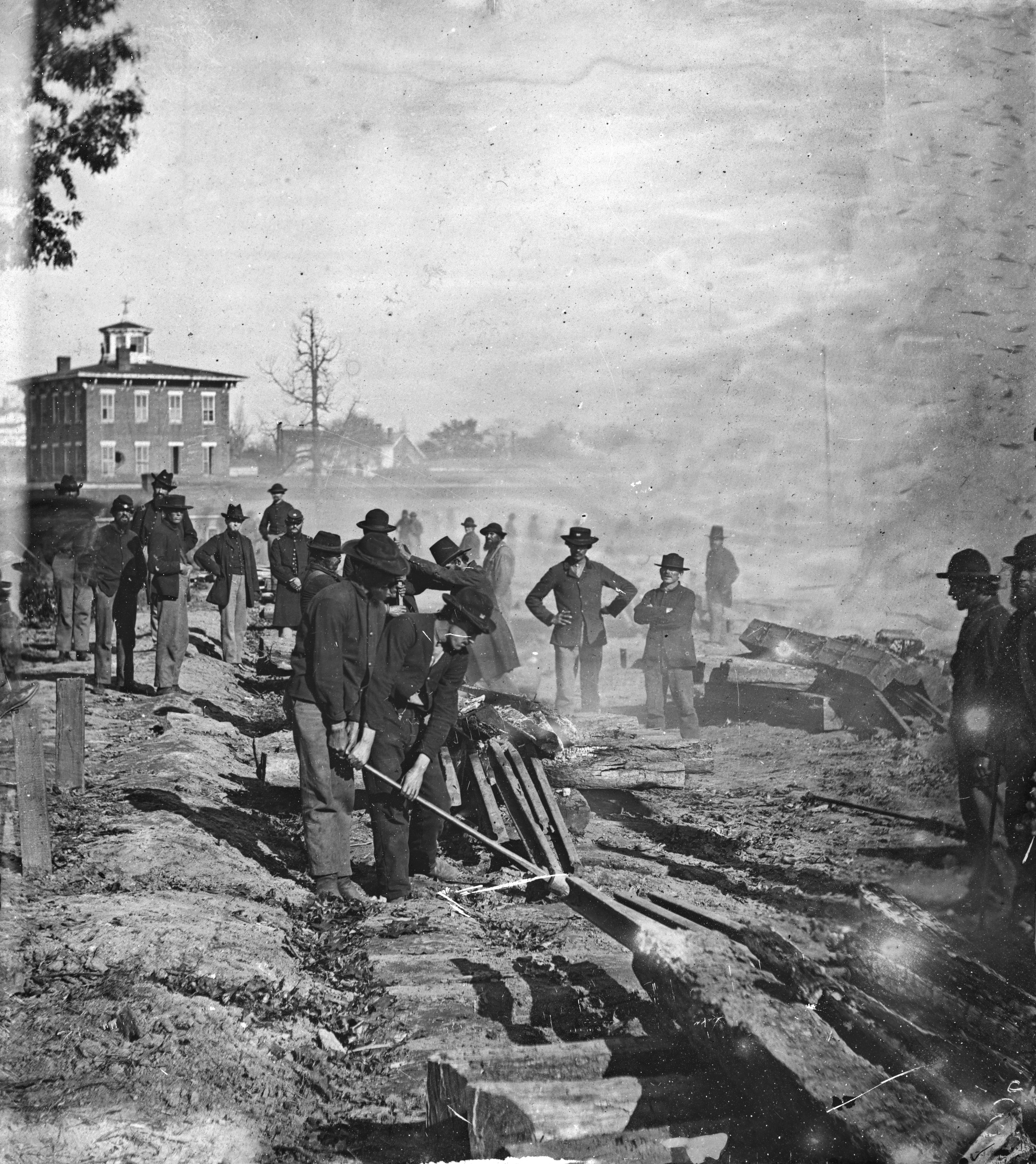
Sherman's troops destroying a railroad in Atlanta, photographed by George N. Barnard, 1864

Like Grant and Lincoln, Sherman was convinced that the Confederacy's strategic, economic, and psychological ability to wage further war needed to be crushed if the fighting were to end. Therefore, he believed that the North had to conduct its campaign as a war of conquest, employing scorched earth tactics to break the backbone of the rebellion. Historian Mark Grimsley promoted the use of the term "hard war" to refer to this strategy in the context of the American Civil War. (Note: Sherman wrote in a letter to Halleck, dated December 24, 1864, "that we are not only fighting hostile armies, but a hostile people, and must make old and young, rich and poor, feel the hard hand of war, as well as their organized armies.") Sherman's advance through Georgia and the Carolinas was characterized by widespread destruction of civilian supplies and infrastructure. This strategy has been characterized by some military historians as an early form of total war, although the appropriateness of that term has been questioned by many scholars. Holden-Reid, for instance, argued that "the concept of 'total war' is deeply flawed, an imprecise label that at best describes the two world wars but is of dubious relevance to the U.S. Civil War."

After the fall of Atlanta in 1864, Sherman ordered the city's immediate evacuation. When the city council appealed to him to rescind that order, on the grounds that it would cause great hardship to women, children, the elderly, and others who bore no responsibility for the conduct of the war, Sherman sent a written response in which he sought to articulate his conviction that a lasting peace would be possible only if the Union were restored, and that he was therefore prepared to do all he could do to end the rebellion:

You cannot qualify war in harsher terms than I will. War is cruelty, and you cannot refine it; and those who brought war into our country deserve all the curses and maledictions a people can pour out. I know I had no hand in making this war, and I know I will make more sacrifices to-day than any of you to secure peace. But you cannot have peace and a division of our country. If the United States submits to a division now, it will not stop, but will go on until we reap the fate of Mexico, which is eternal war ... I want peace, and believe it can only be reached through union and war, and I will ever conduct war with a view to perfect and early success.

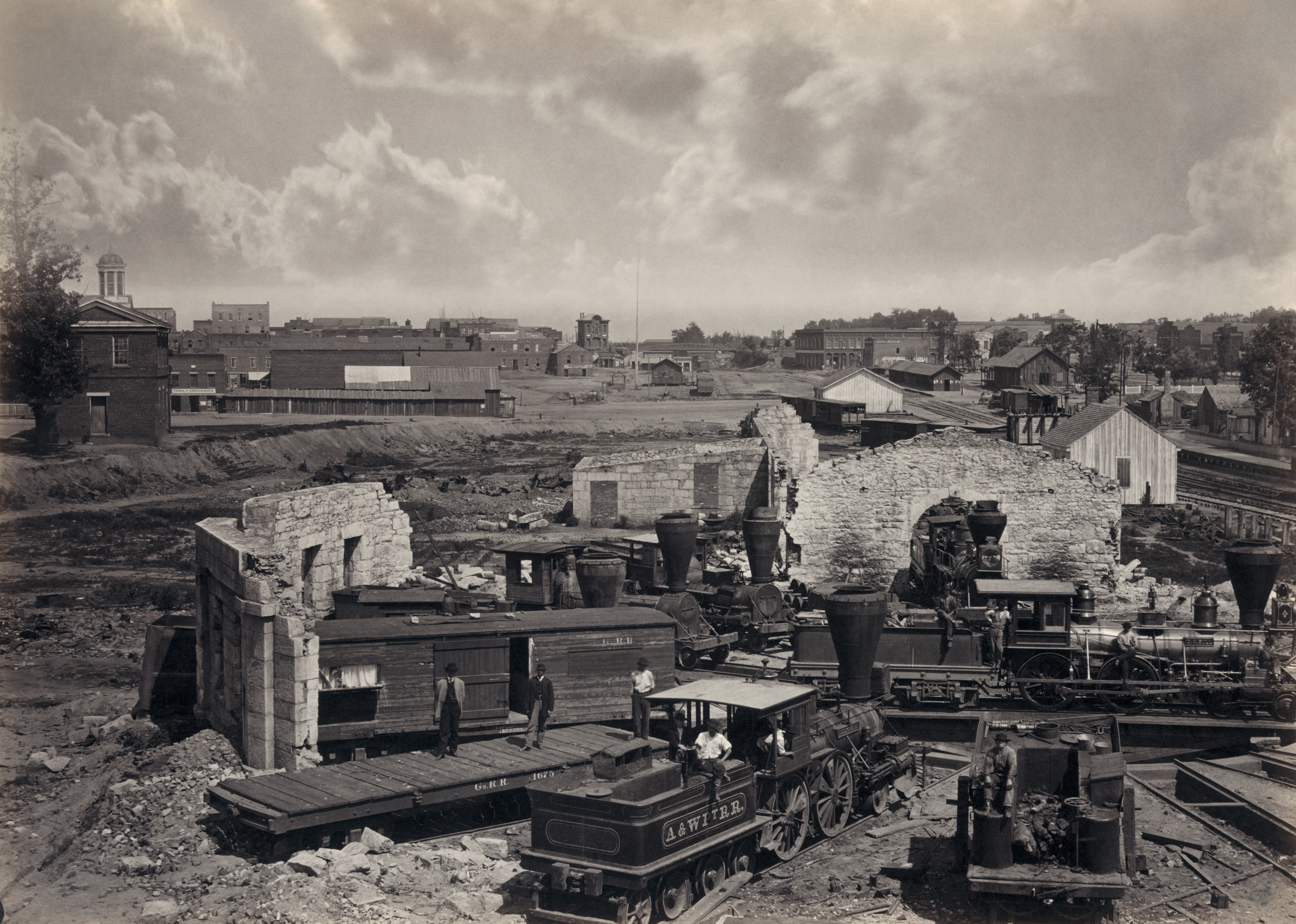
An 1866 albumen print of a railway roundhouse in Atlanta shows extensive damage following the Atlanta campaign.

The damage done by Sherman's marches through Georgia and the Carolinas was almost entirely limited to the destruction of property. Looting was officially forbidden, but historians disagree on how rigorously this regulation was enforced. Though exact figures are not available, the loss of civilian life appears to have been very small. Consuming supplies, wrecking infrastructure, and undermining morale were Sherman's stated goals, and several of his Southern contemporaries noted this and commented on it. For instance, Alabama-born Major Henry Hitchcock, who served in Sherman's staff, declared that "it is a terrible thing to consume and destroy the sustenance of thousands of people", but if the scorched earth strategy served "to paralyze their husbands and fathers who are fighting [...] it is mercy in the end". One of Sherman's tactics was to destroy the railways by pulling up the rails, heating them over a bonfire, and twisting them to leave behind what came to be known as "Sherman's neckties". This made repairs extremely difficult at a time when the Confederacy lacked both iron and heavy machinery.

The severity of the destructive acts by Union troops was significantly greater in South Carolina than in Georgia or North Carolina. This appears to have been a consequence of the animosity felt by Union soldiers and officers for the state that they regarded as the "cockpit of secession". One of the most serious accusations against Sherman was that he allowed his troops to burn the city of Columbia. Some pro-Confederate sources have repeated a claim that Oliver Otis Howard, the commander of Sherman's 15th Corps, said in 1867 that "It is useless to deny that our troops burnt Columbia, for I saw them in the act." Sherman stated that "[i]f I had made up my mind to burn Columbia I would have burnt it with no more feeling than I would a common prairie dog village; but I did not do it". Sherman's official report on the burning placed the blame on Confederate Lieutenant General Wade Hampton, who Sherman said had ordered the burning of cotton in the streets. In his memoirs, Sherman said, "In my official report of this conflagration, I distinctly charged it to General Wade Hampton, and confess I did so pointedly, to shake the faith of his people in him, for he was in my opinion boastful, and professed to be the special champion of South Carolina." Historian James M. McPherson has concluded that:

The fullest and most dispassionate study of this controversy blames all parties in varying proportions—including the Confederate authorities for the disorder that characterized the evacuation of Columbia, leaving thousands of cotton bales on the streets (some of them burning) and huge quantities of liquor undestroyed [...] Sherman did not deliberately burn Columbia; a majority of Union soldiers, including the general himself, worked through the night to put out the fires.

In this general connection, Sherman and his subordinates (particularly John A. Logan) took steps to protect Raleigh, North Carolina, from acts of revenge after the assassination of President Lincoln.

== Postwar service ==
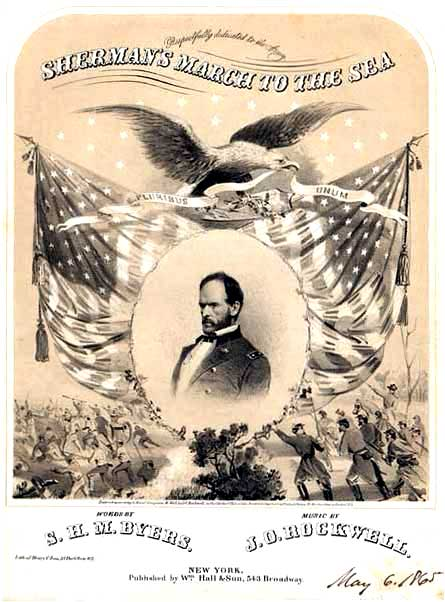
"Sherman's March to the Sea" is a song, with sheet music, celebrating Sherman's military campaign.

In May 1865, after the major Confederate armies had surrendered, Sherman wrote in a personal letter:

I confess, without shame, I am sick and tired of fighting—its glory is all moonshine; even success the most brilliant is over dead and mangled bodies, with the anguish and lamentations of distant families, appealing to me for sons, husbands and fathers ... tis only those who have never heard a shot, never heard the shriek and groans of the wounded and lacerated ... that cry aloud for more blood, more vengeance, more desolation. (Note: This letter was to James E. Yeatman, May 21, 1865, and is excerpted more extensively (and with slight variations) in Bowman and Irwin.)

In June 1865, two months after Lee's surrender at Appomattox, Sherman received his first postwar command, originally called the Military Division of the Mississippi, later the Military Division of the Missouri, which came to comprise the territory between the Mississippi River and the Rocky Mountains. Sherman's efforts in that position were focused on protecting the main wagon roads, such as the Oregon, Bozeman, and Santa Fe Trails. Tasked with guarding a vast territory with limited forces, Sherman grew weary of the multitude of requests for military protection addressed to him. On July 25, 1866, the U.S. Congress created the new rank of General of the Army for Grant, while also promoting Sherman to Grant's previous rank of lieutenant general.

=== Indian Wars ===
There was little large-scale military action against the Indians during the first three years of Sherman's tenure as divisional commander, as Sherman allowed negotiations between the U.S. government and Indian leaders to proceed, while he built up his troops and awaited completion of the Union Pacific and Kansas Pacific Railroads. During this time, he was a member of the Indian Peace Commission. Though the commission was responsible for the negotiation of the Medicine Lodge Treaty and the Treaty of Fort Laramie, Sherman did not have a significant role in drafting those treaties because in both cases he was called away to Washington during the negotiations. In one instance, he was summoned to testify as a witness in the impeachment of Andrew Johnson. He testified in the trial on April 11 and 13, 1868. He successfully negotiated other treaties, such as the removal of Navajos from the Bosque Redondo to traditional lands in Western New Mexico.

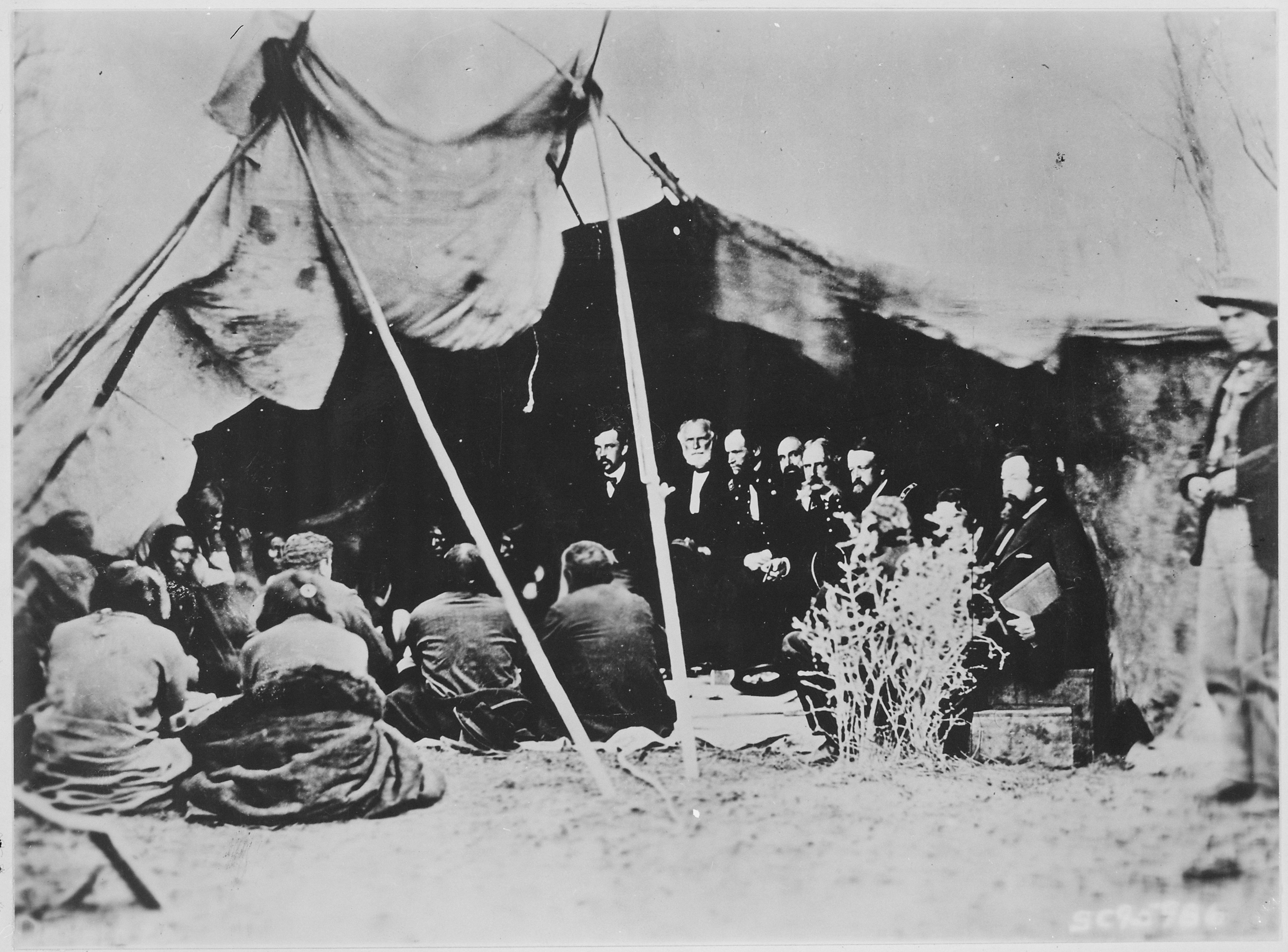
Sherman (third from left) and other Indian Peace Commissioners in council with native chiefs and headmen, at the signing of the Treaty of Fort Laramie in 1868

When the Medicine Lodge Treaty failed in 1868, Sherman authorized his subordinate in Missouri, Major General Philip Sheridan, to lead the winter campaign of 1868–1869, which included the Battle of Washita River. Sheridan used hard-war tactics similar to those he and Sherman had employed in the Civil War. In 1871, Sherman ordered that the leaders of the Warren Wagon Train raid, an attack by a Kiowa and Comanche war party from which Sherman himself had narrowly escaped, be tried for murder in Jacksboro, Texas. The resulting trial of Satanta and Big Tree marked the first occasion in which Native American chiefs were tried by a civilian court in the United States.

Sherman regarded the expansion of the railroad system "as the most important element now in progress to facilitate the military interests of our Frontier". One of the main concerns of his postwar service was, therefore, to protect the construction and operation of the railroads from hostile Indians. Sherman's views on Indian matters were often strongly expressed. Following the 1866 Fetterman Massacre, in which 81 U.S. soldiers were ambushed and killed by Native American warriors, Sherman telegraphed Grant that in order to control the Bozeman Trail, "we must act with vindictive earnestness against the Sioux, even to their extermination, men, women and children". In 1867, he wrote to Grant that "we are not going to let a few thieving, ragged Indians check and stop the progress" of the railroads.

In 1873, at the height of the Modoc War conflict, Sherman wrote in a private letter that "during an assault, the soldiers can not pause to distinguish between male and female, or even discriminate as to age. As long as resistance is made, death must be meted out, but the moment all resistance ceases, the firing will stop and all survivors turned over to the proper Indian agent". This stance is credited with the near extermination and aggressive relocation of the Modoc Tribe. Defying Secretary of Interior Columbus Delano's orders to General Edward Canby to cede ancestral homelands to Kintpuash and his Modoc band, Sherman sent telegrams to Canby to "make an example" of the renegade Modoc.

Displacement of the Plains Indians was facilitated by the growth of the railroads and the eradication of the bison. Sherman believed that bison eradication should be encouraged as a means of weakening Indian resistance to assimilation. He voiced this view in remarks to a joint session of the Texas legislature in 1875, although the U.S. Army under Sherman's command never conducted its own program of bison extermination. Sherman encouraged bison hunting by private citizens and, when Congress passed a law in 1874 to protect the bison from over-hunting, Sherman helped convince President Grant to use a pocket veto to prevent it from coming into force.

=== General of the Army ===
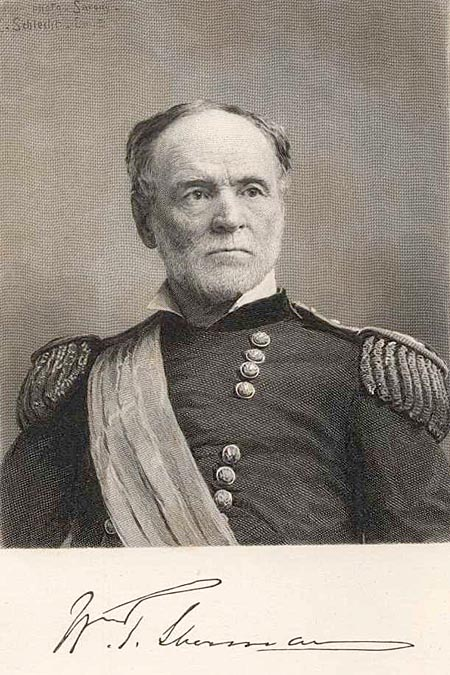
An 1885 portrait of Sherman by Napoleon Sarony in the frontispiece of the second edition of Sherman's Memoirs, published in 1886.

When Grant became president in 1869, Sherman was appointed Commanding General of the United States Army and promoted to the rank of full general. After the death of John A. Rawlins, Sherman also served for one month as acting Secretary of War.

Sherman's early tenure as Commanding General was marred by political difficulties, many of which stemmed from disagreements with Secretary of War Rawlins and his successor, William W. Belknap, both of whom Sherman felt had assumed too much power over the army and reduced the position of Commanding General to a sinecure. Sherman also clashed with Eastern humanitarians who were critical of the army's harsh treatment of the Indians and who had apparently found an ally in President Grant. To escape from these difficulties, Sherman moved his headquarters to St. Louis in 1874. He returned to Washington in 1876, when the new Secretary of War, Alphonso Taft, promised him greater authority.

Much of Sherman's time as Commanding General was devoted to making the Western and Plains states safe for settlement through the continuation of the Indian Wars, which included three significant campaigns: the Modoc War, the Great Sioux War of 1876, and the Nez Perce War. Despite his harsh treatment of the warring tribes, Sherman spoke out against speculators and government agents who abused the Native Americans living within the reservations. During this time, Sherman also reorganized the U.S. Army forts to better accommodate the shifting frontier.

In 1875, ten years after the end of the Civil War, Sherman became one of the first Civil War generals to publish his memoirs. The Memoirs of General William T. Sherman. By Himself, published by D. Appleton & Company in two volumes, began with the year 1846 (when the Mexican War began) and ended with a chapter about the "military lessons of the [civil] war". The publication of Sherman's memoirs sparked controversy and drew complaints from many quarters. (Note: In 1875, Henry V. Boynton published a critical review of Sherman's memoirs "based upon compilations from the records of the war office". A defense of Sherman by C. W. Moulton was also published that year.) Grant, who was president when Sherman's memoirs appeared, later remarked that others had told him that Sherman treated Grant unfairly but "when I finished the book, I found I approved every word; that ... it was a true book, an honorable book, creditable to Sherman, just to his companions—to myself particularly so—just such a book as I expected Sherman would write."

According to critic Edmund Wilson, Sherman:

[H]ad a trained gift of self-expression and was, as Mark Twain says, a master of narrative. [In his Memoirs] the vigorous account of his pre-war activities and his conduct of his military operations is varied in just the right proportion and to just the right degree of vivacity with anecdotes and personal experiences. We live through his campaigns ... in the company of Sherman himself. He tells us what he thought and what he felt, and he never strikes any attitudes or pretends to feel anything he does not feel.

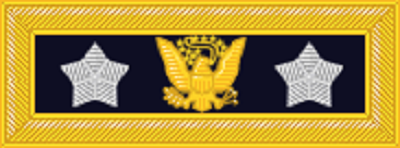
This shoulder strap insignia was introduced by Sherman in 1872 for his use as General of the Army.

During the election of 1876, Southern Democrats who supported Wade Hampton for governor used mob violence to attack and intimidate African American voters in Charleston. Republican Governor Daniel Henry Chamberlain appealed to President Grant for military assistance. In October 1876, Grant, after issuing a proclamation, instructed Sherman to gather all available Atlantic region troops and dispatch them to South Carolina to stop the mob violence.

On June 19, 1879, Sherman delivered a wholly inspirational address to the graduating class of the Michigan Military Academy, in which he did not use the word hell, nor mention the horrors of war. However, on August 12, 1880, he addressed a crowd of more than 10,000 in Columbus, Ohio: "There is many a boy here today who looks on war as all glory, but, boys, it is all hell." One month later a reporter for the Columbus Dispatch simplified those words to "Gen. Sherman said war was hell". By June 1881 it had become mainstream that General Sherman had said "War is hell".

"Sherman's War Report," a caricature of Sherman published in The Wasp shortly after his resignation as Commanding General of the U.S. Army, November, 17 1883

In 1880, Sherman organized and accompanied President Rutherford B. Hayes' tour of the West Coast of the United States, the first undertaken by a president. One of Sherman's significant contributions as head of the Army was the establishment of the Command School (now the Command and General Staff College) at Fort Leavenworth in 1881. Sherman stepped down as commanding general on November 1, 1883, and retired from the army on February 8, 1884, at the then-mandatory retirement age of 64.

== Final years ==
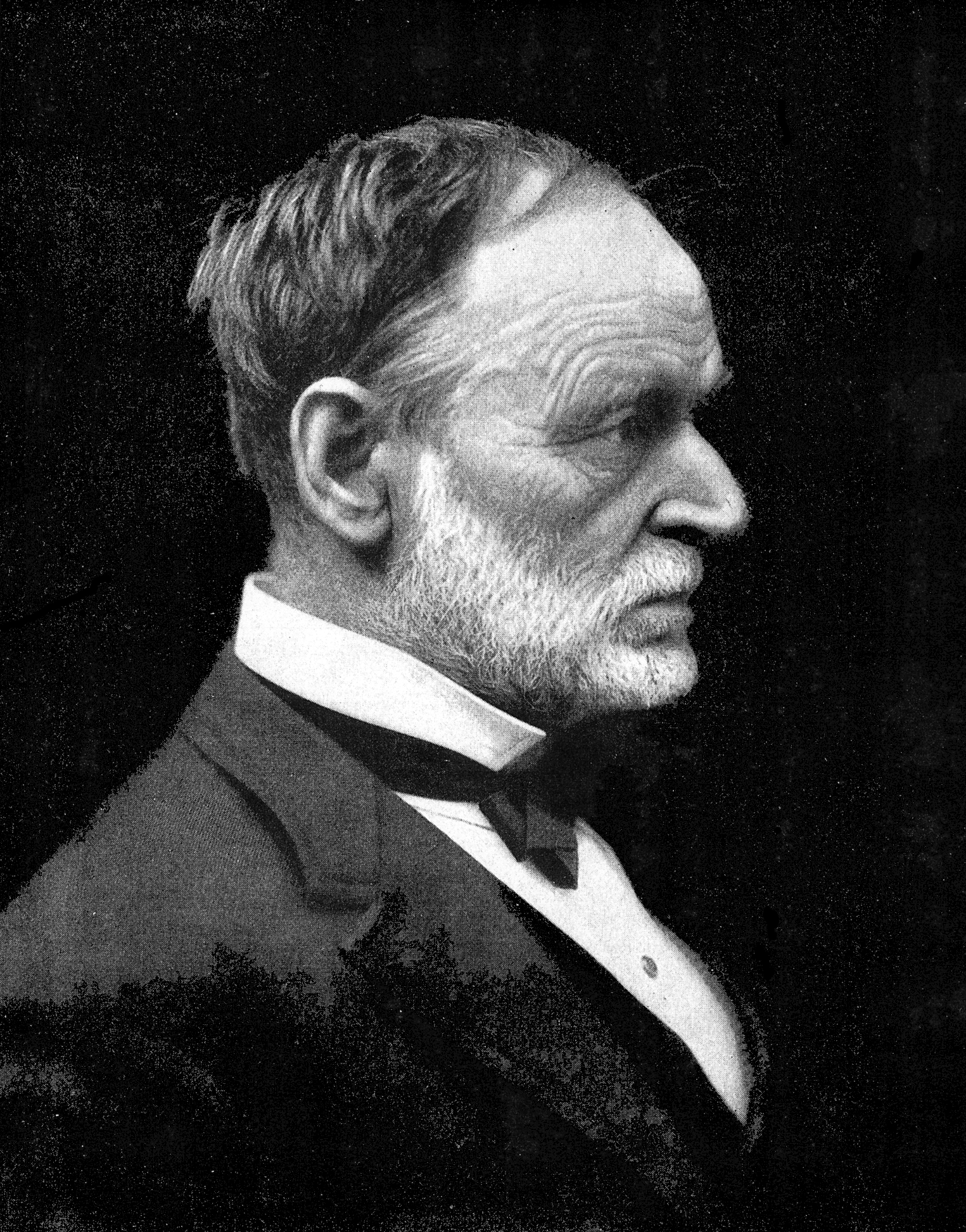
Sherman in his later years, in civilian evening clothes

Sherman lived most of the rest of his life in New York City. He was devoted to the theater and to amateur painting and was in demand as a colorful speaker at dinners and banquets, in which he indulged a fondness for quoting Shakespeare. During this period, he remained in contact with war veterans, and he was an active member of various social and charitable organizations.

Proposed as a Republican candidate for the presidential election of 1884, Sherman declined as emphatically as possible, saying, "I will not accept if nominated and will not serve if elected." Such a categorical rejection of a candidacy is now referred to as a "Shermanesque statement".

In 1886, after the publication of Grant's memoirs, Sherman produced a "second edition, revised and corrected" of his own memoirs. This new edition, published by Appleton, added a second preface, a chapter about his life up to 1846, a chapter concerning the post-war period (ending with his 1884 retirement from the army), several appendices, portraits, improved maps, and an index. For the most part, Sherman refused to revise his original text on the ground that "I disclaim the character of historian, but assume to be a witness on the stand before the great tribunal of history" and "any witness who may disagree with me should publish his own version of [the] facts in the truthful narration of which he is interested". However, Sherman did include the views of some others in the appendices to the new edition. (Note: In one amusing change to his text, Sherman dropped the assertion that John Sutter, of gold-rush fame, had become "very 'tight'" at a Fourth of July celebration in 1848 and stated instead that Sutter "was enthusiastic".) (Note: A "third edition, revised and corrected" of Sherman's memoirs was put out in 1890 by Mark Twain's firm Charles L. Webster & Co., which had published Grant's memoirs. This and other later versions were all printed from the plates of the 1886 or, in some cases, the 1875 edition.)

=== Death ===
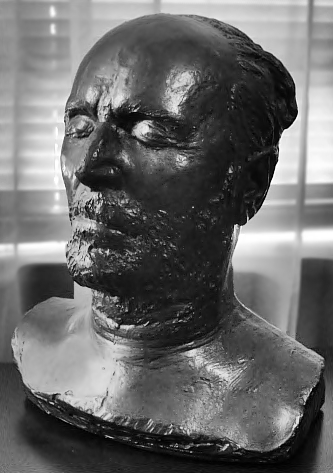
Sherman's death mask

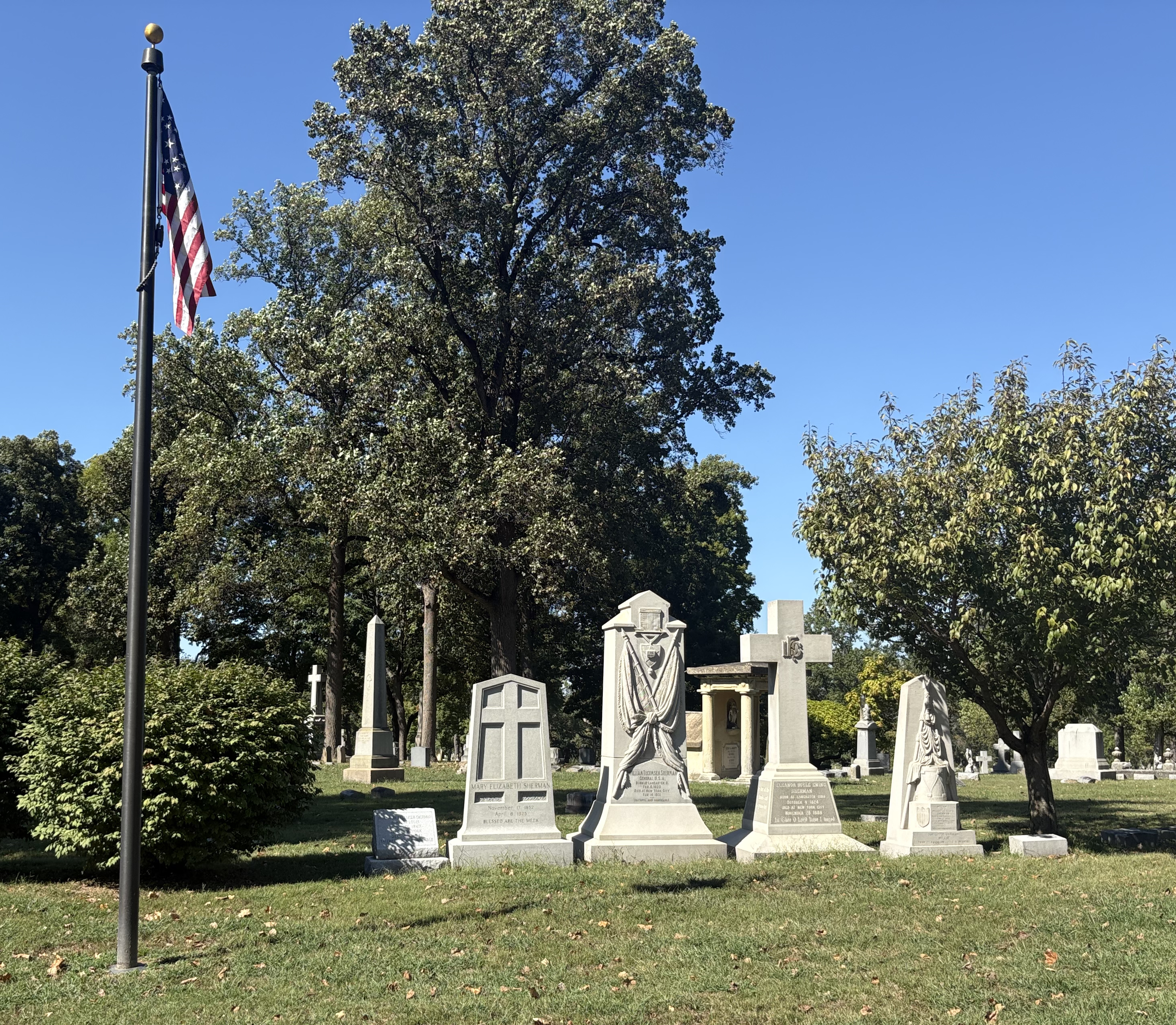
Graves of Sherman and family at Calvary Cemetery

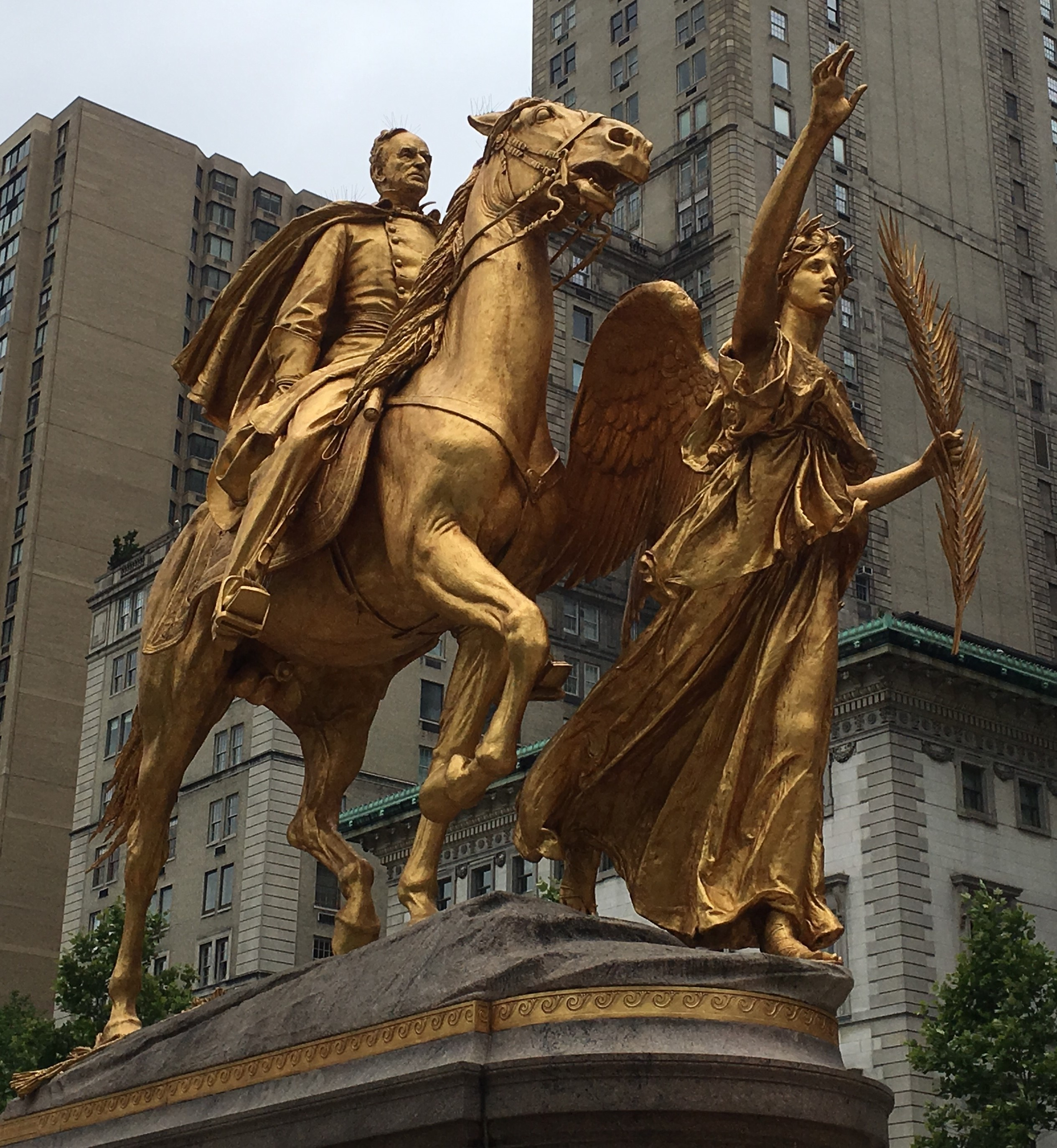
Statue in Grand Army Plaza (Manhattan)

Sherman died of pneumonia in New York City at 1:50 PM on February 14, 1891, six days after his 71st birthday. President Benjamin Harrison, who served under Sherman, sent a telegram to Sherman's family and ordered all national flags to be flown at half staff. Harrison, in a message to the Senate and the House of Representatives, wrote that:

He was an ideal soldier, and shared to the fullest the esprit de corps of the army, but he cherished the civil institutions organized under the Constitution, and was only a soldier that these might be perpetuated in undiminished usefulness and honor.

On February 19, a funeral service was held at his home, followed by a military procession. Joseph E. Johnston, the Confederate officer who had commanded the resistance to Sherman's troops in Georgia and the Carolinas, served as a pallbearer in New York City. It was a bitterly cold day and a friend of Johnston, fearing that the general might become ill, asked him to put on his hat. Johnston replied: "If I were in [Sherman's] place, and he were standing in mine, he would not put on his hat." Johnston did catch a serious cold and died one month later of pneumonia.

Sherman's body was then transported to St. Louis, where another service was conducted at a local Catholic church on February 21, 1891. His son, Thomas Ewing Sherman, who was a Jesuit priest, presided over his father's funeral masses in New York City and in St. Louis. Former U.S. president and Civil War veteran Rutherford B. Hayes, who attended both ceremonies, said at the time that Sherman had been "the most interesting and original character in the world." He is buried in Calvary Cemetery in St. Louis.

== Religious views ==
Sherman's birth family was Presbyterian and he was originally baptized as such. His foster mother, Maria Ewing, was devoutly Catholic and raised her own children in that faith. Sherman was re-baptized as a Catholic, but Maria's husband, Senator Thomas Ewing, insisted that the young Sherman not be compelled to practice Catholicism. Sherman observed but did not join in the religious ceremonies of the Ewing household. He later married his foster sister Ellen, who was also a devout Catholic. In 1864, she took up temporary residence in South Bend, Indiana, in order to have her young family educated at the University of Notre Dame and St. Mary's College, both Catholic institutions.

Sherman wrote to his wife in 1842: "I believe in good works rather than faith." In letters written in 1865 to Thomas, his eldest surviving son, General Sherman said "I don't want you to be a soldier or a priest, but a good useful man", and complained that Thomas's mother, Ellen, "thinks religion is so important that everything else must give way to it". Thomas's decision to abandon his career as an attorney in 1878 to join the Jesuits and prepare for the Catholic priesthood caused Sherman profound distress, and he referred to it as a "great calamity". Father and son, however, were reconciled when Thomas returned to the United States in August 1880, after having travelled to England for his religious instruction.

Some modern historians have characterized Sherman as a deist in the manner of Thomas Jefferson, while others identify him as an agnostic who accepted many Christian values, but lacked faith. Except during the personal crisis triggered by his son Thomas's decision to become a priest, Sherman's personal attitude toward the Catholic Church was tolerant and even friendly at a time when anti-Catholic prejudice was common in the United States. In 1888, Sherman wrote publicly that "my immediate family are strongly Catholic. I am not and cannot be." Upon Sherman's death, his son Thomas publicly declared: "My father was baptized in the Catholic Church, married in the Catholic Church, and attended the Catholic Church until the outbreak of the civil war. Since that time he has not been a communicant of any church."

== Historical reputation ==
Since the public mind has settled to the conclusion that the institution of slavery was so interwoven in our system that nothing but the interposition of Providence and horrid war could have eradicated it, and now that it is in the distant past, and that we as a nation, North and South, East and West, are the better for it, we believe that the war was worth to us all it cost in life and treasure. – W. T. Sherman (1887)

In the years immediately after the war, Sherman was popular in the North and well regarded by his own soldiers. At the same time, he was generally respected in the South as a military man, while his conservative politics were attractive to many white Southerners. By the 1880s, however, Southern "Lost Cause" writers began to demonize Sherman for his attacks on civilians in Georgia and South Carolina. The magazine Confederate Veteran, based in Nashville, dedicated more attention to Sherman than to any other Union general, in part to enhance the visibility of the Civil War's western theater. In this new discourse, Sherman's devastation of railroads and plantations mattered less than his perceived insults to southern dignity and especially to its unprotected white womanhood. Sherman was thus presented by Lost-Cause authors as the antithesis of the Southern ideals of chivalry supposedly embodied by General Lee.

In the early 20th century, Sherman's role in the Civil War attracted attention from influential British military writers, including Field Marshal Lord Wolseley, Maj. Gen. J. F. C. Fuller, and especially Capt. B. H. Liddell Hart. Hart declared that Sherman was "the most original genius of the American Civil War" and "the first modern general". American historian Wesley Moody has argued that these commentators tended to filter Sherman's actions and his hard-war strategy through their own ideas about modern warfare, thereby contributing to the exaggeration of his atrocities and unintentionally feeding into the negative assessment of Sherman's moral character associated with the "Lost Cause" school of Southern historiography. This led to the publication of several works, notably John B. Walters's Merchant of Terror: General Sherman and Total War (1973), that presented Sherman as responsible for "a mode of warfare which transgressed all ethical rules and showed an utter disregard for human rights and dignity". Following Walters, James Reston Jr. argued in 1984 that Sherman had planted the "seed for the Agent Orange and Agent Blue programs of food deprivation in Vietnam". More recently, historians such as Brian Holden-Reid have challenged such readings of Sherman's record and of his contributions to modern warfare.

The influential literary critic Edmund Wilson found in Sherman's Memoirs a fascinating and disturbing account of an "appetite for warfare" that "grows as it feeds on the South". Former U.S. Defense Secretary Robert McNamara refers equivocally to the statement that "war is cruelty and you cannot refine it" in both the book Wilson's Ghost and in his interview for the documentary film The Fog of War (2003). When comparing Sherman's scorched-earth campaigns to the actions of British forces during the Second Boer War (1899–1902)—another war in which civilians were targeted because of their central role in sustaining a belligerent power—South African historian Hermann Giliomee claimed that it "looks as if Sherman struck a better balance than the British commanders between severity and restraint in taking actions proportional to legitimate needs". The admiration of scholars such as B. H. Liddell Hart, Lloyd Lewis, Victor Davis Hanson, John F. Marszalek, and Brian Holden-Reid for Sherman owes much to what they see as an approach to the exigencies of modern armed conflict that was both effective and principled. (Note: According to Victor Davis Hanson, "In the eyes of Lewis and Liddell Hart, Sherman was a great man, who is judged on what he did and not on what he wrote: he saved lives and shortened the war; and he used military science to teach his nation what war is ultimately for.")

== Monuments and tributes ==
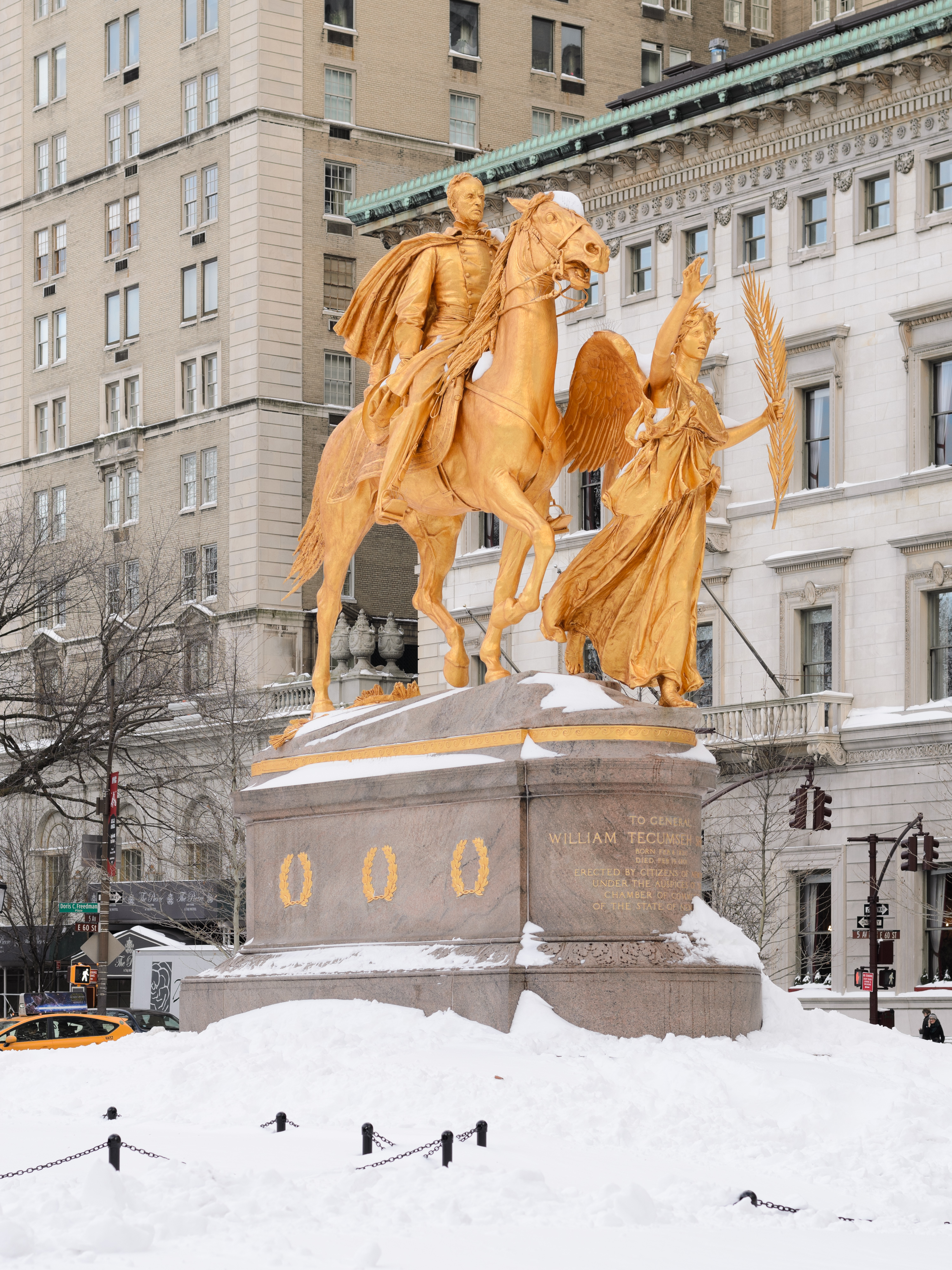
The 1902 Sherman monument by Augustus Saint-Gaudens is in Grand Army Plaza in Manhattan, New York City.

The gilded bronze Sherman Memorial (1902) by Augustus Saint-Gaudens stands at the Grand Army Plaza near the main entrance to New York City's Central Park. Sherman is represented astride his horse Ontario and led by a winged woman representing Victory. Saint-Gaudens's Bust of William Tecumseh Sherman, which he used as the basis for the larger Memorial, is at the Metropolitan Museum of Art. Arlington National Cemetery features a smaller version of Saint-Gaudens's statue of Victory.

The General William Tecumseh Sherman Monument (1903) by Carl Rohl-Smith stands near President's Park in Washington, D.C. The bronze monument consists of an equestrian statue of Sherman and a platform with a soldier at each corner, representing the infantry, artillery, cavalry, and engineer branches of the U.S. Army. The site was chosen because Sherman was reported to have stood there while reviewing returning Civil War troops in May 1865.

Other posthumous tributes include Sherman Circle in the Petworth neighborhood of Washington, D.C., the M4 Sherman tank, which was named by the British during World War II, and the "General Sherman" Giant Sequoia tree, which is the most massive documented single-trunk tree in the world.

There are only a few Generals of the US Army who are honored on a US postage stamp, and even fewer who appear more than twice as General Sherman has. The first postage stamp to honor Sherman was released to the public by the US Post Office on February 22, 1893, a little more than two years after his death, on Washington's birthday.

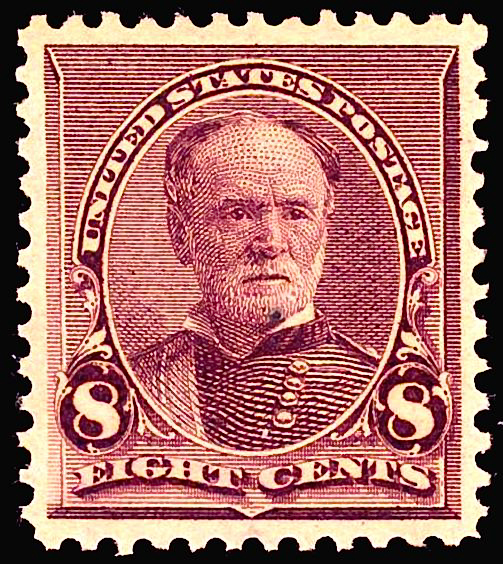
1st Sherman stamp Issue of 1893

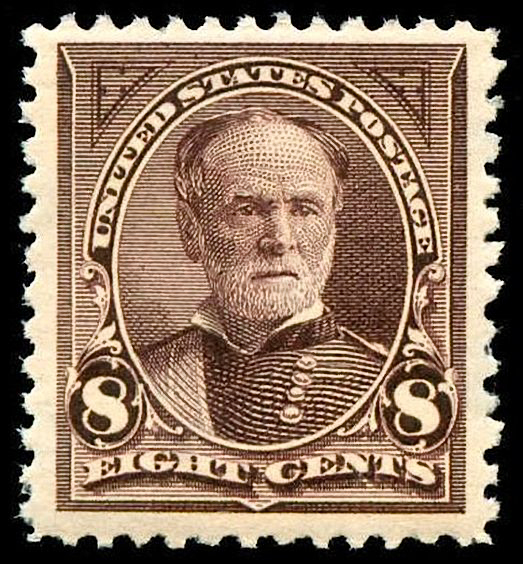
Sherman Issue of 1895

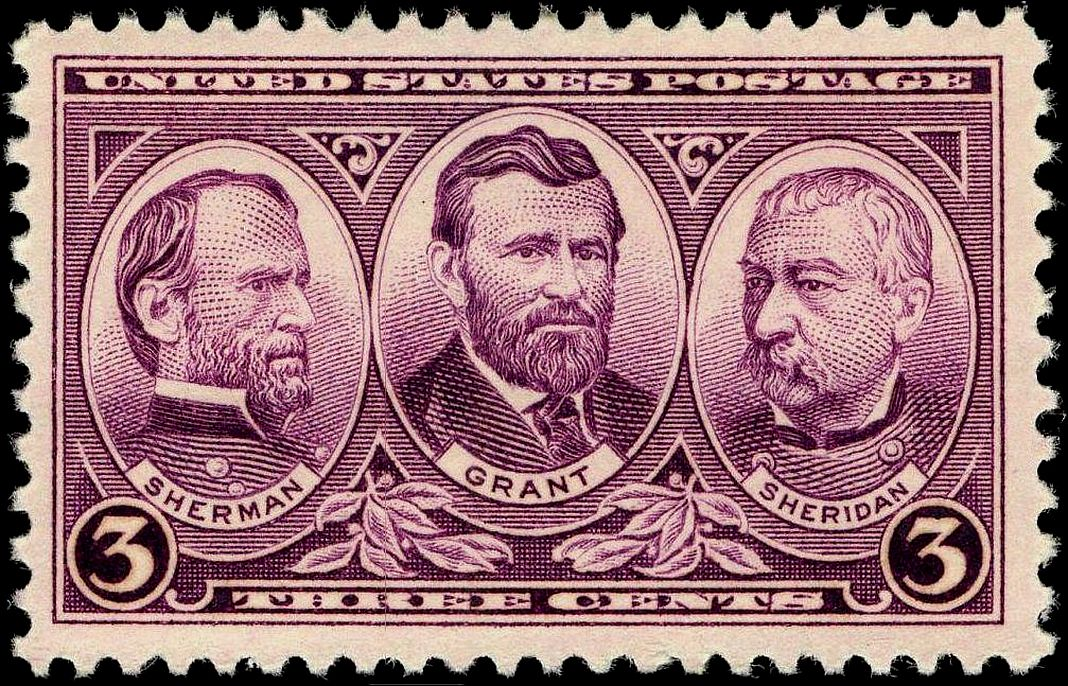
Sherman ~ Grant ~ Sheridan 1937 commemorative issue

== Dates of rank ==
Insignia	Rank	Date	Component
No insignia	Cadet, USMA	July 1, 1836	Regular Army
An insignia with a navy blue background	Second Lieutenant	July 1, 1840	Regular Army
An insignia with a navy blue background and a yellow vertical bar at both ends	First Lieutenant	November 30, 1841	Regular Army
alt=An insignia with a navy blue background and two yellow vertical bars at both ends	Brevet Captain	May 30, 1848	Regular Army
An insignia with a navy blue background and three yellow vertical bars at both ends	Captain	September 27, 1850	Regular Army (Resigned September 6, 1853.)
An insignia with a navy blue background and a silver eagle	Colonel	May 14, 1861	Regular Army
An insignia with a navy blue background and a silver star in the middle	Brigadier General	May 17, 1861	Volunteers
An insignia with a navy blue background and two silver stars	Major General	May 1, 1862	Volunteers
An insignia with a navy blue background and a silver star in the middle	Brigadier General	July 4, 1863	Regular Army
An insignia with a navy blue background and two silver stars	Major General	August 12, 1864	Regular Army
An insignia with a navy blue background and three silver stars	Lieutenant General	July 25, 1866	Regular Army
An insignia with a navy blue background and a silver star, a gold eagle, and another silver star	General	March 4, 1869	Regular Army
An insignia with a navy blue background and a silver star, a gold eagle, and another silver star	General	February 8, 1884	Retired

== Publications ==
=== Books ===
- Personal memoirs of Gen. W.T. Sherman. Vol. 1 (3rd ed.). New York: Charles L. Webster and Company. 1890.
- Personal memoirs of Gen. W.T. Sherman. Vol. 2 (3rd ed.). New York: Charles L. Webster and Company. 1890.

This is actually a re-printing of the second, revised edition of 1889, published by D. Appleton & Company, of New York City. The first edition was published in 1875 by Henry S. King & Co., of London, and by Appleton in New York. All other "editions" of Sherman's memoirs are re-printings of the 1889 or, in some cases, the 1875 edition.

=== Book chapters ===
- Johnson, Robert U.; Buel, Clarence C., eds. (1888). "The Grand Strategy of the Last Year of the War". Battles and Leaders of the Civil War. Vol. IV. The Century Co. pp. 247–259.

=== Articles ===
- "Sherman on Grant". North American Review. 142 (350): 111–113. January 1886. JSTOR 25118577.
- Sherman, W. T. (March 1886). "An Unspoken Address to the Loyal Legion". North American Review. 142 (352): 295–308. JSTOR 25118599.
- Sherman, W.T. (May 1887). "Grant, Thomas, Lee". North American Review. 144 (366). University of Northern Iowa: 437–450. JSTOR 25101219.
- "The Grand Strategy of the War of the Rebellion". Century Magazine. 35: 582–598. February 1888.
- Sherman, W. T. (October 1888). "Old Shady, with a Moral". North American Review. 147 (383): 361–368. JSTOR 25101627.
- Sherman, W. T. (November 1888). "Camp-Fires of the G. A. R." North American Review. 147 (384): 497–502. JSTOR 25101651.
- Sherman, W. T. (December 1888). "Hon. James G. Blaine". North American Review. 147 (385): 616–625. JSTOR 25101676.
- Sherman, W. T. (March 1889). "Old Times in California". North American Review. 148 (388): 269–279. JSTOR 25101733.
- Sherman, William T. (August 1890). "Our Army and Militia". North American Review. 151 (405): 129–125. JSTOR 25102027.

=== Letters and other documents ===
- Who Burnt Columbia?: Official Depositions of Wm. Tecumseh Sherman and Gen. O.O. Howard, U.S.A., for the Defence, and Extracts from Some of the Depositions for the Claimants. Charleston, SC: Walker, Evans & Cogswell. January 1873.
- Sherman, W. T. (March 1891). "Unpublished Letters of General Sherman". North American Review. 142 (352): 371–375. JSTOR 25102150.
- Thorndike, Rachel Sherman, ed. (1894). The Sherman Letters: Correspondence between General and Senator Sherman from 1837 to 1891. New York: Charles Scribner's Sons.
- "General Sherman's Tour of Europe". Century Magazine. 35: 729–740. 1899.
- De Wolfe Howe, M. A., ed. (1909). Home letters of General Sherman. New York: Charles Scribner's Sons.
- Fleming, Walter L., ed. (1912). General W. T. Sherman as College President. The Arthur H. Clark Company. "A Collection of Letters, Documents, and Other Material, Chiefly from Private Sources, Relating to the Life and Activities of General William Tecumseh Sherman, to the Early Years of Louisiana State University, and the Stirring Conditions Existing in the South on the Eve of the Civil War"
- Ewing, Joseph H., ed. (1992). Sherman at War. Morning House, Incorporated. ISBN 978-0-89029-539-7. "An annotated collection of previously unpublished letters written by Sherman to his father-in-law and brother-in-law during the years of the Civil War"
- Simpson, Brooks D.; Berlin, Jean V., eds. (1999). Sherman's Civil War: Selected Correspondence of William T. Sherman, 1860–1865. Civil War in America. Chapel Hill & London: University of North Carolina Press. ISBN 978-0-8078-2440-5.

== See also ==
- List of American Civil War generals (Union)

== Notes ==
Military offices
Preceded by Ulysses S. Grant	Commander of the Army of the Tennessee; 1863–1864	Succeeded by James B. McPherson
Preceded by Ulysses S. Grant	Commander of the Military Division of the Mississippi; 1864–1866	Position abolished
Preceded by John Pope	Commander of the Military Division of the Missouri; 1865–1869	Succeeded by Philip H. Sheridan
Preceded by Ulysses S. Grant	Commanding General of the United States Army; 1869–1883	Succeeded by Philip H. Sheridan
