= Mervyn Frost =

Political scientist

Mervyn Frost FKC (born 1947) is a South African and British political scientist.

== Life ==
Frost was born and brought up in Johannesburg, he studied at Highlands North Boys High School, the Stellenbosch University (BA, MA, DPhil) and as a Rhodes Scholar at the University of Oxford (BPhil).

== Career ==
Initially Frost taught at the University of Cape Town and Rhodes University and was then appointed to the Chair of Political Science at the University of Natal (South Africa). In 1996 he moved to England where he was appointed Professor of International Relations at the University of Kent in Canterbury.

In 2003 he moved to London to his present position as Professor of International Relations in the Department of War Studies, King's College London. From 2007 to 2013 he was Head of the Department of War Studies, KCL (DWS).

He is a past President of the South African Association of Political Studies and former editor of Politikon and currently serves on the editorial board of several journals including Review of International Studies; South African Journal of International Affairs; Politics and Ethics Review; Journal of International Political Theory; International Political Sociology, Politics and Governance; The Scandinavian Journal of Military Studies, Defence Strategic Communications.

Frost was on the Executive Committee of the International Studies Association (ISA) and until 2008 Chairman of the International Ethics Section of the ISA. He was appointed a Fellow of King's College London in 2018.

== Personal life ==
He is married to Lola Frost who is an artist. They have two daughters, Sarah who is a poet living in Durban and Anna who is a doctor in Cape Town. They have four grandchildren: Joseph, Thomas, Samuel and Ella.

== Selected publications ==
Frost developed and elaborated a theory of international relations known as "Constitutive Theory" which he articulated in a number of books and articles including:

- Towards a Normative Theory of International Relation (CUP, 1986)
- Ethics in International Relations (CUP, 1996)
- Constituting Human Rights: Global Civil Society and the Society of Democratic States (Routledge, 2002)
- Global Ethics: Anarchy, Freedom and International Relations (Routledge, 2009)
- Practice Theory and International Relations, co-authored with Silviya Lechner (Cambridge University Press 2018)

He edited a 4 volume reference work entitled International Ethics (Sage 2011). His recent work, with Dr Silviya Lechner, is focused on the "practice turn" in International Relations. They co-authored: "Two Conceptions of International Practice: Aristotelian praxis or Wittgensteinian language-games?" in Review of International Studies Volume 42 / Issue 02 / April 2016, pp 334 – 350 and "Understanding international relations from the internal point of view" July 2015 in Journal of International Political Theory p. 1-21.

His recent publications include:

- "Strategic communications in international relations: practical traps and ethical puzzles" (co-author Nicholas Michelsen) in Defence Strategic Communications, Vol 2, Spring 2017, pp 9-34
- "Ethical traps in international relations" (co-author Richard Ned Lebow), International Relations, (published online) November 2018, hard copy International Relations, 2018
- "Practice Theory and International Relations: a reply to our critics" in Global Constitutionalism (published online), 2020, Vol 9, Issue 1, pp 220–239

Academic offices
Preceded by Brian Holden-Reid	Head of Department of War Studies, KCL; 2007–2013	Succeeded by Theo Farrell
