= Brian Holden Reid =

British military historian (born 1952)

Brian Holden Reid FRHistS, FRGS, FRSA, FKC (born 1952) is a British military historian specializing in the American Civil War and contemporary wars in Europe.

== Career ==
Holden Reid studied at University of Hull, University of Sussex and University of London. He taught at Polytechnic of North London and City University London. In 1982 he joined King's College London and the Department of War Studies, KCL. He was appointed lecturer in 1987, to senior lecturer in 1992 and to chair in 2000. He served as Head of the Department of War Studies 2001–2007, and in 2007 he was awarded the Fellowship of King's College (FKC), the highest honour the college can award its alumni and staff. He was also a member of the College Council 2010–2019.

Holden Reid is also a fellow of the Royal Historical Society, the Royal Geographical Society, the Royal Society of Arts (RSA) and the Royal United Services Institute (RUSI). From 1984 to 1987 he was editor of the RUSI Journal in Whitehall, and he edited the RUSI's publications, including its Defence Studies Series (Macmillan). In 1996 he became a Consultant Editor (Military History) to the RUSI Journal, and has continued to be a member of its editorial board and numerous other journals.

From 1987 to 1997 he served as Resident Historian at Staff College, Camberley. He was the first civilian to serve on the Directing Staff for over a century, and helped set up the Higher Command and Staff Course to prepare selected Colonels and Brigadiers for the most senior appointments. He is an honorary graduate of the School of Advanced Military Studies at the United States Command and General Staff College, Fort Leavenworth

As a historian, he specialises in the American Civil War, which he portrayed in connection with the European wars at the same time. He also looks at 20th century British and American military theory, specifically the work of John Frederick Charles Fuller and Basil Liddell Hart.

In 2019 he was awarded the prestigious Samuel Eliot Morison Prize by the Society for Military History.

== Selected publications ==
As author

- The Scourge of War: The Life of William Tecumseh Sherman. OUP USA, 2020
- The American Civil War and the wars of the nineteenth century. HarperCollins, New York 2006
- America’s Civil War. The operational battlefield, 1861–1863. Prometheus Books, Amherst, N.Y. 2008
- The Origins of the American Civil War. Longman, London 1996
- J. F. C. Fuller. Military thinker. Macmillan, London 1987
- Robert E. Lee. Icon for a nation. Weidenfeld and Nicolson, London 2005
- Studies in British military thought. Debates with Fuller and Liddell Hart. Greenhill, London 1999

As editor

- with John White: American Studies. Essays in Honour of Marcus Cunliffe. Macmillan, London 2015 (EA London 1991)[2]
- with David French: The British General Staff. Reform and innovation c. 1890–1939 (= Military history and policy; 10). Frank Cass, London 1993
- with Susan Mary-Grant: The American Civil War. Explorations and reconsiderations. Longman, New York 2000, (Introduction by James Macpherson).[3]
- Military power. Land warfare in theory and practice. Frank Cass, London 1997 [4]
- The Science of war. Back to first principles (= The operational level of war). Routledge, London 1993
- with Michael Dewar: Military strategy in a changing Europe. Towards the twenty-first century. Brassey's, London 1991
- with Carlo Schaerf und David Carlton: New technologies and the arms race (= Studies in disarmament and conflicts). St. Martin's Press, New York 1989

Academic offices
Preceded by Christopher Dandeker	Head of Department of War Studies, KCL; 2001–2007	Succeeded by Mervyn Frost
