= John Allen Williams =

American political scientist (born 1945)

- Born: 1945 (age 80–81)
- Other name: Jay Williams
- Spouse: Karen Kay Lauterbach

Academic background
- Education: Grinnell College; University of Pennsylvania
- Doctoral advisor: Henry Teune
- Other advisor: Alvin Z. Rubinstein
- Influences: Morris Janowitz; Charles Moskos; Sam C. Sarkesian

Academic work
- Discipline: Political science
- Institutions: Loyola University Chicago
- Main interests: Military issues; civil–military relations; national security strategy
- Military career
- Branch: United States Navy
- Service years: 1969–1999
- Rank: Captain
- Website: jwillia.sites.luc.edu

John Allen Williams (born 1945), also known as Jay Williams, is a professor emeritus of political science at Loyola University Chicago and is the former chair and president of the Inter-University Seminar on Armed Forces and Society (2003–2013). He serves on the editorial board of the National Strategy Forum in Chicago, is editor of the National Strategy Forum Review, and is on the board of directors for the Pritzker Military Museum & Library.

John Williams is a retired captain in the US Naval Reserve, where he served aboard the USS Columbus (CG-12) and at the US Naval Academy. As a strategic plans officer in the US Navy, he also served on active and reserve duty with the Chief of Naval Operations (Strategic Concepts Branch), the Joint Chiefs of Staff (Strategy Branch), the Office of the Secretary of Defense (assistant principal deputy undersecretary for strategy and resources), the Naval War College, and the commander, Second Fleet.

John Williams is notable for his contributions to the study of the military, civil–military relations, and national security strategy. He has published extensively on these topics, co-authoring works with other notable figures in civil–military relations such as Sam C. Sarkesian, Charles C. Moskos, David R. Segal.

== Notable publications ==
- U.S. National Security: Policymakers, Processes, and Politics, 4th Edition (coauthor, with Sam C. Sarkesian and Stephen J. Cimbala), Boulder, Colorado: Lynne Rienner Press, 2008, ISBN 978-1588264169.
- The Postmodern Military: Armed Forces After the Cold War (coeditor and contributor, with Charles C. Moskos and David R. Segal) (New York: Oxford University Press, 2000).
- Soldiers, Society, and National Security (coauthor, with Sam C. Sarkesian and Fred B. Bryant) (Boulder, CO: Lynne Rienner Press, 1995).
- "The U.S. Military: Balancing Old and New Challenges," National Strategy Forum Review (Winter, 2009), pp. 31–38.
- "The Military and Society Beyond the Postmodern Era," Orbis: A Journal of World Affairs 52, No. 2 (Spring 2008), pp. 199–216.
- "Understanding Asymmetric Warfare: Threats and Responses," National Strategy Forum Review (Summer 2007), pp. 23–26.
- "The U.S. Naval Academy: Stewardship and Direction," U.S. Naval Institute Proceedings, 123, No. 5 (May 1997), pp. 67–72.
- "The New Military Professionals," U.S. Naval Institute Proceedings, 122, No. 5 (May 1996), pp. 42–48.
- "Civil-Military Relations and the American Way of War", in Stephen J. Cimbala, ed., Civil-Military Relations in Perspective: Strategy, Structure and Policy (Farnham, UK: Ashgate, forthcoming 2011).
- "Civil-Military Relations in the Second Bush Administration," in Stephen J. Cimbala, ed., The George W. Bush Defense Program: Policy, Strategy, & War (Washington, DC: Potomac Books, 2010), pp. 101–111.
- "Educating Military Officers for an Ambiguous Strategic Future," Testimony before the US House of Representatives Armed Services Committee, Subcommittee on Oversight and Investigations, September 10, 2009.
- "Anticipated and Unanticipated Consequences of the Creation of the All-Volunteer Force," in The U.S. Citizen-Soldier at War: A Retrospective Look and the Road Ahead (Chicago: McCormick Foundation, 2008).
- "Political Science Perspectives on the Military and Civil-Military Relations," in Giuseppe Caforio, ed., Social Sciences and the Military: An Interdisciplinary Overview (London and New York: Routledge, 2007).
- "Do Military Policies on Gender and Sexuality Undermine Combat Effectiveness?" (with Laura L. Miller), in Peter D. Feaver and Richard H. Kohn, eds., Soldiers and Civilians: The Civil-Military Gap and American National Security (Cambridge: MIT Press, 2001), pp. 361–402.

Professional and academic associations
Preceded by David R. Segal	President of the Inter-University; Seminar on Armed Forces and Society; 2003–2013	Succeeded by James Burk
