= Thomas Crosbie (sociologist) =

Canadian military sociologist

Thomas Crosbie is a Canadian sociologist who studies military sociology, civil-military relations, military politics, and Professional Military Education (PME). Crosbie is an Associate Professor of Military Operations at the Center for Joint Operations in the Department of Military Operations at the Royal Danish Defence College.

== Background ==
Thomas Crosbie earned his B.A. in English at Memorial University of Newfoundland in Canada, his M.A. in Literary Studies at La Trobe University in Australia, and his M.A., M.Phil., and Ph.D. in Sociology at Yale University in New Haven, Connecticut. While at Yale, he was a Junior Fellow at the Center for Cultural Sociology and at the Center for Comparative Research, and he taught classes on the Sociology of Crime and Deviance and on state-building in the Middle East.

== Career ==
Crosbie began his career at the University of Maryland, College Park, in 2014, before moving to the Royal Danish Defense College in 2017. Crosbie was hired as an Assistant Professor of Military Operations and Military Studies before being promoted to an associate professor in 2019.

During his time at the Royal Danish Defense College, he served as the Course Director for Joint Warfare on the Military-Strategic and Operational Level; an editorial board member for the journals Armed Forces & Society and the Scandinavian Journal of Military Studies; the Chief Editor of the Scandinavian Journal of Military Studies, and the Editor of the Military Politics book series with Berghahn Books.

Additionally, he is a council member of the Inter-University Seminar on Armed Forces and Society (IUS). Crosbie has also appeared on Denmark’s TV 2, The New York Times, and the Navy Times.

== Research and work ==
Crosbie’s research focuses on a broad range of topics, including civil-military relations, military politics, media-military relations, and Professional Military Education (PME). His work on military politics explores the use of the military in domestic politics, senior military officers’ roles in democracies, and the role of private military contractors in conflict regions. Speaking to Denmark’s TV 2, Crosbie discussed the ramifications for U.S. generals who might not want to involve themselves in domestic politics. Additionally, he advised a New York Times Magazine article on U.S. Military Contractors left behind or killed in Kuwait.

Crosbie’s scholarship on media-military relations highlights how the military has dealt with integrating the media’s considerations into its operations. His book, The Political Army: How the U.S. Military Learned to Manage the Media and Public Opinion, examines the U.S. Army’s deepening involvement with media opinion and engagement over the last 60 years.

Finally, his research on Professional Military Education (PME) has focused on officer education in NATO countries. His article, "NATO Professional Military Education at 75: Rethinking the Competency-Development Process", co-authored with Simon Smith and Holger Lindhardtsen, looks at the way NATO and its member nations can ensure that their military officers are properly prepared for future wars.

== Media Appearances ==
Crosbie had made numerous media appearances on outlets like Time Magazine, The New York Times, Fortune, PBS, and the Danish news outlet Berlingske. Throughout these appearances, he's spoken on President Trump's rhetoric towards Greenland, the implications a possible escalation could have had, and how civil-military norms may be changing under President Trump.

== Notable publications ==
- Crosbie, Thomas (2023). Military Politics: New Perspectives. Berghahn Books. ISBN 978-1-80539-023-7.
- Crosbie, Thomas (11 March 2025). The Political Army: How the U.S. Military Learned to Manage the Media and Public Opinion. Columbia University Press. ISBN 978-0-231-56289-8.
- Smith, Simon J.; Crosbie, Thomas; Lindhardtsen, Holger (3 July 2025). "NATO professional military education at 75: rethinking the competency-development process". Defence Studies. 25 (3): 740–748. doi:10.1080/14702436.2025.2474066. ISSN 1470-2436.
- Coletta, Damon; Crosbie, Thomas (2022). "Janowitz and Huntington—Better Together: A Response". Armed Forces & Society. 48 (3): 723–729. doi:10.1177/0095327X20988556. ISSN 0095-327X.
- Coletta, Damon; Crosbie, Thomas (2021). "The Virtues of Military Politics". Armed Forces & Society. 47 (1): 3–24. doi:10.1177/0095327X19871605. ISSN 0095-327X.
- Crosbie, Thomas (2021). "Clausewitz and Military Politics: Theoretical Reflections on a Strong Program Approach to War and the Military". Militarization and the Global Rise of Paramilitary Culture. Singapore: Springer Singapore. doi:10.1007/978-981-16-5588-3_2. ISBN 978-981-16-5587-6.
- Crosbie, Thomas; Kleykamp, Meredith (2020). "Civilian Military Experts: Findings from the 2017 Survey of American Military Experts". Rethinking Military Professionalism for the Changing Armed Forces. Cham: Springer International Publishing. doi:10.1007/978-3-030-45570-5_9. ISBN 978-3-030-45569-9.
- Swed, Ori; Kwon, Jae; Feldscher, Bryan; Crosbie, Thomas (2020). "The Corporate War Dead: New Perspectives on the Demographics of American and British Contractors". Armed Forces & Society. 46 (1): 3–24. doi:10.1177/0095327X18811375. ISSN 0095-327X.
