= Wilbur Scott =

Wilbur Scott is an American sociologist known for contributions to military sociology and the sociology of veterans’ issues. He is Professor Emeritus at both the University of Oklahoma and the U.S. Air Force Academy, having served on the faculty of these institutions for 30 years and 15 years, respectively.

== Background ==
In May 1967, Scott received his B.A. degree in sociology/psychology from St. John’s University and was commissioned 2nd Lieutenant in the U.S. Army. He served a tour of duty in Vietnam as an infantry platoon leader with the 4th Infantry Division in 1968 and 1969.

He enrolled in graduate school, receiving his M.A. in sociology from the University of Texas-El Paso in 1972, and his doctoral education at Louisiana State University in the tradition of political sociology developed there by noted German émigré and scholar, Professor Rudolf Heberle. Scott’s 1976 dissertation documented seismic shifts in New Orleans’ political landscape after the 1965 Voting Rights Act enfranchised African Americans. This work presaged the election of Ernest Morial as the city’s first Black mayor in 1977.

== Career ==
Scott held the positions of Instructor in the Sociology Department at the University of Oklahoma in 1975, Assistant Professor from 1976 to 1982, and Associate Professor from 1982 to 1992. In these years, he published analyses of many other elections and political controversies. He was promoted to Full Professor in 1992 and was Chair of the Sociology Department from 1996 to 2003.

Also during these years he served on the Governing Board of the Inter-University Seminar on Armed Forces and Society (IUS) from 1993 to 1997, the Advisory Board of the National Veterans' Legal Services Project, Washington, D.C., from 1994 to 2001, the President's Advisory Committee on Gulf War Veterans' Illnesses, Washington, D.C., from 1995 to 1996, and the President George H. W. Bush Oral History Project, University of Virginia, 2001. He was the book review editor for the journal Armed Forces & Society from 1995 to 1998.

In 2004, Scott moved to the U.S. Air Force Academy’s Department of Behavioral Sciences and Leadership, first as Distinguished Visiting Professor, then from 2006 to 2019 as Resident Sociologist. In these years, he also served on the Operation Enduring Memory Oral History Project, Fort Carson, Colorado, 2004 to 2006, on the Army Capstone Project, U.S. Army Training and Doctrine Command, Ft. Monroe, Virginia, 2010, and on the U.S. Department of Defense Comprehensive Review Working Group on Implementation of the Repeal of Don’t Ask, Don’t Tell, 2010.

== Research ==
Scott’s research after receiving tenure focused on making sense of his own experiences in Vietnam and as a veteran thereafter. The first phase culminated in the work, The Politics of Readjustment: Vietnam Veterans Since the War. This 1993 book has been hailed as a definitive treatise on the sociology of veterans’ issues. It was reissued in 2004 as Vietnam Veterans Since the War: the Politics of PTSD, Agent Orange, and the National Memorial. In 1995, he and Sandra Carson Stanley published the volume, Gays and Lesbians in the Military: Issues, Concerns, and Contrasts, addressing the U.S. military’s then newly adopted “Don’t Ask, Don’t Tell” policy.

At the Air Force Academy, Scott’s expertise expanded to include leader decision-making in complex socio-cultural war environments and the sociologies of irregular warfare and remotely piloted aircraft (RPAs). He led research teams that surveyed and collected oral histories from active-duty soldiers at Fort Carson, Colorado, National Guard soldiers from seven states who served in Iraq and Afghanistan, and the families of RPA pilots stationed at Creech Air Force Base, Nevada. He also developed dilemma-training scenarios at Ft. Carson and the Air Force Academy for analyzing and inculcating ethical behaviors in combat zones. Scott’s courses developed a popular following among cadets at the Academy, especially his Sociology of Violence and War class.

In 2023, Scott, with Karin De Angeles and David R. Segal, published what is only the second textbook in military sociology, Military Sociology: A Guided Introduction. (The first was published in 1965 by Charles H. Coates and Roland J. Pellegrin.)

== Awards and recognition ==
Throughout his career, Scott has received numerous accolades. In 1974, he was a visiting scholar at the Inter-University Consortium for Political and Social Research, University of Michigan. He received the University of Oklahoma Distinguished Lectureship Award in 1986. In 1991 and 1992, he was invited visiting scholar at U.F.R. de Psychologie et Sciences Sociales, Université Blaise Pascal, Clermont-Ferrand, France, where he conducted a research project on French veterans of the war in Algeria. And, in 2012 he was invited to be a senior research scholar at the Center for Research on Military Organization at the University of Maryland.

In August 2007, Scott received the American Psychological Association’s Special Recognition Award, presented each year by the APA for “exceptional contributions to military psychology by a non-psychologist.” In 2008, he received the Outstanding Academy Educator Award, the Air Force Academy’s highest award for teaching excellence. Upon retirement in 2019, he received the U.S. Air Force Civilian Career Achievement Award and, that same year, IUS presented him the Morris Janowitz Lifetime Achievement Award, an honor accorded by IUS “to a limited number of senior scholars whose careers most demonstrate excellence in the study of armed forces and society and important service to the discipline.”

== Notable publications ==
- Wilbur J. Scott. “PTSD and Agent Orange: Implications for a Sociology of Veterans' Issues.” Armed Forces and Society, vol. 18 (Summer 1992), pp. 592–612.
- Wilbur J. Scott. The Politics of Readjustment: Vietnam Veterans Since the War. Hawthorne, N.Y.: Aldine de Gruyter Publishing Company, 1993. Reissued in 2004 as Vietnam Veterans Since the War: The Politics of PTSD, Agent Orange, and the National Memorial, Norman, Okla.: University of Oklahoma Press.
- Wilbur J. Scott and Sandra Carson Stanley (eds.), Gays and Lesbians in the Military: Issues, Concerns, and Contrasts. Hawthorne, N.Y.: Aldine de Gruyter Publishing Company, 1995.
- Wilbur J. Scott, David R. McCone, and George R. Mastroianni. “Psychological Contracts in Two U.S. Combat Units in Iraq: What Happens When Expectations and Realities Diverge?” Sociological Focus, vol. 39 (November 2006), pp. 301–318.
- Wilbur J. Scott, David R. McCone, and George R. Mastroianni. “The Deployment Experiences of Ft. Carson’s Soldiers in Iraq: Thinking About and Training for Full-Spectrum Warfare.” Armed Forces and Society, vol. 35 (April 2009), pp. 460–476.
- George R. Mastroianni and Wilbur J. Scott. “Reframing Suicide in the Military,” Parameters, vol. 41 (Summer 2011), pp. 6–21. Featured in Mark Thompson, “A Scary New Way of Looking at Military Suicides – In the Mirror,” Battleland, November 10, 2011. http://battleland.blogs.time.com/2011/11/10/a-scary-new-way-of-looking-at-military-suicides-%e2%80%93-in-the-mirror-2/
- Wilbur J. Scott et al. “Mixed-Methods in a Post-Deployment Study of U.S. Army National Guard Soldiers,” Journal of Workplace Behavioral Health, vol. 26 (Fall 2011), pp. 275–295.
- Wilbur J. Scott, Damian McCabe, and David R. McCone. “Teaching Cultural Competencies for Complex Socio-Cultural Contexts: Evidence from a Realistic Decision-Making Field Simulation,” Res Militaris, vol. http://resmilitaris.net/3 (Winter-Spring/Hiver-Printemps 2013).
- Wilbur J. Scott. “Veterans and Veterans’ Issues.” Pp. 127-146 in David Kieran and Edwin A. Martini (eds.), At War: Militarism and U.S. Culture in the 20th Century and Beyond, Pescataway, N.J.: Rutgers University Press, 2018.
- Wilbur J. Scott, Karin Modesto De Angeles, and David R. Segal. Military Sociology: A Guided Introduction. London and New York: Routledge, Taylor & Francis Group, 2023.
- David McCone, Wilbur Scott, and Joseph Soeters. “The Inter-University Seminar on Armed Forces and Society 70 Years Later: Alive and Kicking,” Armed Forces & Society 50th Anniversary Issue, vol. 51 (April 2024), pp. 427–458.
