= Brenda L. Moore =

Military Sociologist/Scholar

Brenda L. Moore is an American Sociologist. She is currently an Associate Professor of Sociology at the University at Buffalo, known for her contributions to military sociology, particularly in the areas of race and ethnic relations, gender studies, and sexual trauma.

== Background ==
Moore earned her B.A. in Sociology from the State University of New York at Stony Brook in 1980 after completing her service as an Equal Opportunity Specialist in the Army. Moore earned her M.A. and Ph.D. in Sociology at the University of Chicago in 1984 and 1987, respectively. Her dissertation was entitled "Effects of the All-Volunteer Force on Civilian Status Attainment".

== Career ==
Moore began her career as a Visiting Assistant Professor at Indiana University Northwest before joining the University at Buffalo as an Assistant Professor in the Department of Sociology in 1988, before being promoted to Associate Professor in 1996. While at Buffalo she also held the position of the Director of Undergraduate Studies; and served on and chaired over twenty committees, including the Faculty Senate Committee on Affirmative Action, the Law and Society Search Committee, the Race and Ethnicity Search Committee, and the Search Committee for College of Arts and Sciences Dean.

Moore also served as a Research Associate in the New York Veterans’ Affairs System; a Visiting Scholar at Cornell University’s Peace Studies Program; and as a Faculty Fellow at the University of Maryland at College Park.

She is a member of the American Sociological Association, Association of Black Sociologists, and has been a member of the Joint Center for Political Studies Associates Program, the Congressional Black Caucus Veterans Braintrust, Inc., and the Women's Army Corps Veterans Association.

Additionally, she is the Associate Editor for the journals Armed Forces & Society and the Second World War Series and is the Secretary of the Inter-University Seminar on Armed Forces and Society (IUS). She teaches graduate and undergraduate courses in the areas of race and ethnic relations, military sociology, social stratification, and a special topic on women working in non-traditional roles.

== Research ==
Moore’s research includes topics such as race, gender, and sexual harassment in the armed forces. Her work on race explores racial and ethnic differences in veterans’ health, racial equality, and diversity in the military.

In 2001, Moore testified before the Congressional Black Caucus on the impact military downsizing would have on African American men and women. In 2003, she authored a report to the Defense Equal Opportunity Management Institute at Patrick AFB detailing the path to full integration for African Americans in the U.S.

Additionally, much of her research has focused on women in the military, specifically African American women. In 1996, Moore published her book, To Serve My Country, To Serve My Race, the first comprehensive study of the only all-Black female battalion to serve overseas during World War II.

She is also the author of the book Serving Our Country, Japanese American Women in the Military during World War II, published by Rutgers University Press in 2003.

She served as the editor for Armed Forces & Society’s 2017 Special Issue on Women in the Military and has authored numerous articles and reports on sexual trauma and harassment among U.S. service members and veterans.

== Impact and accomplishments ==
Brenda Moore has been widely recognized for her contributions to the field of military sociology.

In 1994, Moore was appointed by President Clinton to the American Battle Monuments Commission, the agency that maintains and promotes America’s overseas commemorative cemeteries and memorials.

In September 1995, Moore served as a United Nations Delegate through the Women in International Security (WIIS) organization and participated in the NGO Forum on Women during the UN’s Fourth World Conference on Women in Beijing, China. This conference brought together over 17,000 participants from around the world to advance gender equality and women's empowerment globally. As a delegate, Moore engaged in international dialogue, policy discussions, and strategy workshops focused on peace, security, and the status of women.

In 1998, she advised the Department of Defense on equal opportunity in the military.

On March 24, 1999, Moore organized and hosted a community dialogue as part of the White House Initiative on Race, under the “One America” program. Sponsored by the University at Buffalo’s College of Arts and Sciences, the event was held on the university’s North Campus. It brought together senior leaders from the University at Buffalo and the City of Buffalo to engage in open dialogue on race relations and explore actionable strategies for addressing racial inequality. This local dialogue was supported by President Clinton’s Executive Order 13050, which created the President’s Advisory Board on Race, chaired by historian John Hope Franklin. The broader aim of the “One America” initiative was to promote interracial dialogue across the country and move toward a unified, equitable society in the 21st century.

In September 2005, Moore co-organized, along with the late Professor Isabel Marcus, and chaired a two-day international conference titled “Military Culture and Gender.” The event brought together a group of internationally recognized scholars, practitioners, and advocates in the fields of military studies, gender relations, and human rights. The conference was sponsored by the Baldy Center for Law and Social Policy in the University at Buffalo School of Law, reflecting UB’s commitment to interdisciplinary inquiry and social justice.

The keynote address, “Women in the Military and Cultures of Militarization,” was delivered by Cynthia Enloe, Research Professor of International Development and Women’s Studies at Clark University, whose work has shaped global feminist analyses of militarization.

Other presenters included:

- Elizabeth Hillman, Professor of Law, Rutgers University
- Carole Burke, Associate Professor, University of California–Irvine
- Katia Sorin, Laboratoire Georges Friedmann, France
- Laura Miller, Senior Social Scientist, RAND Corporation
- Christine Hansen, Executive Director, The Miles Foundation
- Rani Desai, Associate Professor of Psychiatry, Epidemiology, and Public Health, Yale University
- Bevanne Bean-Mayberry, Associate Professor of Medicine, University of Pittsburgh
- Brenda L. Moore, University at Buffalo
- Ron Armstead, Executive Director, Congressional Black Caucus Veterans Braintrust
- Lepa Mlajenovic, Director, Autonomous Women's Center, Serbia
- Ariane Brunet, Women's Rights Coordinator, Rights and Democracy, Montreal
- Judith Stiehm, Professor, and Rhonda Copelon, Professor, CUNY School of Law

The conference drew a broad audience, including students, faculty, active-duty military personnel, veterans, and human rights advocates. The discussions explored intersections of gender, power, and military culture, addressing issues such as sexual violence in the armed forces, the challenges of reintegration for women veterans, and global movements for gender justice within military institutions. The event was regarded as a landmark gathering, fostering critical dialogue across disciplines and national borders, and solidifying Moore’s reputation as a leading scholar and convener in the field of gender, military, and society.

In 2019, she testified in front of the Congressional Black Caucus about African American female veterans.

She completed three years of service as a member of the Defense Advisory Committee on Women in the Services (DACOWITS), advising the Secretary of Defense on military matters concerning active-duty women.

She also served as a member of the Veterans’ Rural Health Advisory Committee, providing advice to the Secretary of Veterans Affairs on health care issues affecting Veterans residing in rural areas.

== Awards ==
Her awards include:

- National Defense Service Medal for her military service
- Outstanding Veteran Achievement Award
- Congressional Certificate of Merit from the 3rd District of New York
- The Morris Janowitz Career Achievement Award from the Inter-University Seminar on Armed Forces & Society (IUS).

== Notable publications ==
- Moore, Brenda L. 2025., “Commentary on: Military Institutions and Citizenship in Western Societies.” Armed Forces and Society. Vol.51 (2) 532–545
- Seelig, A., A. C. Rivera, C. A. LeardMann, S. Daniel, I.G. Jacobson, V. Stander, B.L. Moore, D. C. Millard, E. J. Boyko, and the Millennium Cohort Team, 2023, “Individual and Military Factors that Modify the Association Between Recent Sexual Trauma and Health Outcomes Among U.S. Service Members and Veterans.” Journal of Interpersonal Violence. Vol. 38 (17–18) 10150-10181.
- Rubino, C., Avery, D. R., McKay, P. F., Moore, B. L., Wilson, D. C., Van Driel, M. S., Witt, L. A., & McDonald, D. P. “And justice for all: How Organizational Justice Climate Deters Sexual Harassment.” Personnel Psychology, 71(4):519–544.
- Moore, Brenda L. "African American Women in the U.S. Military," Armed Forces and Society, 17:363–384.
- Moore, Brenda L. “The Propensity of Junior-Enlisted Personnel to Remain in Today’s Military,” Armed Forces and Society 28, 2:257–278
- Moore, Brenda L. Serving Our Country: Japanese American Women in the Military during World War II, Rutgers University Press.
- Moore, Brenda L. (ed.) “Introduction to Special Issue on Women in the Military” In Armed Forces and Society, 43 (2): 191–201.
- Moore, Brenda L. and Schuyler Webb. "Equal Opportunity in the U.S. Navy: Perceptions of African-American Women," Gender Issues 16,3:99–119.
- Sheehan, Connor M., Robert Hummer, Brenda L. Moore, Kimberly Huyser, and John Sibley Butler. “Duty, Honor, Country, Disparity: Race/Ethnic Differences in Health and Disability among Male Veterans,” In Population Research and Policy Review, Vol. 34, Issue 6, December 2015:785–804.
