= Mady Wechsler Segal =

American sociologist

Mady Wechsler Segal is an American sociologist known for her contributions to military sociology, particularly in the areas of gender integration in the armed forces, military families, and civil-military relations. Segal spent several years at the Walter Reed Army Institute of Research (WRAIR) and was a long-time Professor of Sociology at the University of Maryland.

== Background ==
Born on April 29, 1945, in New York City, Segal received her B.A. from Queens College, City University of New York in 1965. She then pursued graduate studies at the University of Chicago, where she would meet her husband, David R. Segal, and be mentored by Morris Janowitz.

== Career ==
While in her Ph.D. program at the University of Chicago, she would be hired as a lecturer of sociology at Eastern Michigan University. She would serve as a Senior Research Scientist at the Army Research Institute for the Behavioral and Social Sciences before joining the Sociology Department at the University of Maryland.

In 1982, Mady Segal took a position as a Guest Scientist at the Walter Reed Army Institute of Research (WRAIR), where she would spend time at Army posts interviewing service members and their families. This applied research helped her understand military families, and soon after, she would write her most well-known article, “The Military and the Family as Greedy Institutions,” which she published in Armed Forces & Society.

During her career, Segal has served as chair of the Scientific Advisory Committee for the U.S. Army Research Institute's Army Family Research Program; as a member of the National Academy of Sciences Committee on the Performance of Military Personnel; as a Human Resource Consultant to the Secretary of the Army; as a Special Assistant to the Chief of Staff of the U.S. Army; as a consultant to the Army's Senior Review Panel on Sexual Harassment; as a member of the Board of Visitors of the U.S. Military Academy; as a member of the Congressional Commission on Military Training and Gender-Related Issues; as a member of the Naval Research Advisory Committee Panel on Quality of Life; and as Chair of the Section on Peace, War, and Social Conflict of the American Sociological Association.

== Research ==
Mady Segal's research has focused on military personnel issues, with particular attention to military women, military families, and race/ethnicity in the military. Her research and work on military families have been influential in the field of military sociology.

In her article “The Military and the Family as Greedy Institutions,” she developed the concept of the military and family as "greedy institutions," which has become a foundational theory in understanding the demands placed on service members and their families. Copies of her article would even be handed out to deployed servicemembers.

Additionally, offering guidance on how military leaders and organizations can assist families facing deployment challenges, she co-authored “How to Support Families During Overseas Deployments: A Sourcebook for Service Providers”, which would be issued to deployed peacekeepers in Bosnia. This report was distributed to multiple government agencies, including the DoD Quality of Life Office, U.S. Army Europe and 7th Army, National Guard Bureau, U.S. Army Community and Family Support Command, Army Forces Command, Army Family Liaison Office, and the U.S. Army Chaplains' Support Agency.

== Awards and recognition ==
Throughout her career, she received numerous awards for her work, including the Outstanding Civilian Service Medal, the Robin M. Williams, Jr. Award for Distinguished Contributions to Research, Teaching, and Service from the American Sociological Association Section on Peace, War, and Social Conflict, and the Morris Rosenberg Merit Award for Recent Achievement from the District of Columbia Sociological Society.

Segal has been recognized as an expert on military families and on women in the military. She is a Professor Emerita of Sociology at the University of Maryland, Distinguished Scholar Teacher, faculty affiliate of the Women's Studies Department, and Associate Director of the Center for Research on Military Organization.

== Notable publications ==
- Mady W. Segal. "Women's Military Roles Cross-Nationally: Past, Present, and Future." Gender & Society, Vol. 9, No. 6 (December 1995), pp. 757–775.
- Mady W. Segal. "The Military and the Family as Greedy Institutions." Armed Forces & Society, Vol. 13, No. 1 (Fall 1986), pp. 9–38.
- David R. Segal and Mady W. Segal. 2004. “America’s Military Population.” Population Bulletin 59, No. 4 (December): 1–40.
- Mady W. Segal. "Alphabet and Attraction: An Unobtrusive Measure of the Effect of Propinquity in a Field Setting." Journal of Personality and Social Psychology, Vol. 30, No. 5 (November 1974), pp. 654–657.
- D. Bruce Bell, Mary L. Stevens, and Mady W. Segal. How to Support Families during Overseas Deployments: A Sourcebook for Service Providers. Alexandria, VA: U.S. Army Research Institute for the Behavioral and Social Sciences. January 1996.
- Mary C. Bourg and Mady W. Segal. 1999. “The Impact of Family Supportive Policies and Practices on Organizational Commitment to the Army.” Armed Forces & Society, 25 (Summer): 633–652.
- Cooney, Richard T., Mady W. Segal, David R. Segal, and William W. Falk. 2003. “Racial Differences in the Impact of Military Service on the Socioeconomic Status of Women Veterans.” Armed Forces & Society 30, No.1 (Fall): 53–86.
- Bradford Booth, William W. Falk, David R. Segal, and Mady W. Segal. 2000. “The Impact of Military Presence in Local Labor Markets on the Employment of Women.” Gender & Society 14 (April): 318–332.
