= Moskos =

Moskos is a surname. Notable people with the surname include:

- Charles Moskos (1934–2008), American sociologist
- Daniel Moskos (born 1986), American baseball player
- Elias Moskos (1620/1629–1687), Greek educator, shipping merchant, and painter
- Peter Moskos (born 1971), American academic
