= John Sibley Butler =

American sociologist

- Born: July 19, 1947 (age 79); New Orleans, Louisiana, U.S.
- Education: Louisiana State University (BA); Northwestern University (PhD)
- Awards: Washington Monthly Best Book Award
- Scientific career
- Fields: Sociology, management, entrepreneurship, military sociology
- Workplaces: University of Texas at Austin; Aoyama Gakuin University
- Doctoral advisor: Charles Moskos

John Sibley Butler is an American sociologist, management scholar, and international expert on minority business and entrepreneurship. He is professor emeritus of management in the McCombs School of Business at The University of Texas at Austin and holds the J. Marion West Chair for Constructive Capitalism in the Graduate School of Business (emeritus). Butler is recognized for his research on organizational behavior, entrepreneurship, and the dynamics of minority and immigrant business development, as well as his work in military sociology.

== Background and education ==
John Sibley Butler was born on July 19, 1947, in New Orleans, Louisiana. Butler served in Vietnam, earning the Bronze Star for Valor in Combat. In 1969, he earned his B.A. degree from Louisiana State University. Studying under Charles Moskos, Butler received his Ph.D. in sociology in 1974 at Northwestern University.

== Academic positions and research ==
Butler began his career at the University of Texas (UT) at Austin, where he would go on to be the director of UT's Innovation, Creativity, and Capital Institute and the chair of the Department of Management in the Graduate School of Business. In 1986, Butler founded the National Journal of Sociology, which focused on African American topics.

Starting in 1996, he would spend the summers teaching at the Aoyama Gakuin University in Tokyo, Japan, becoming a distinguished visiting professor and lecturing on new venture start-ups and general entrepreneurship. He has also been named a Distinguished Libra Professor at the University of Southern Maine.

== Consulting ==
Professor Butler has consulted for many firms and the U.S. Military. Currently, he is a management consultant for State Farm Insurance at their corporate headquarters in Bloomington, Illinois. In this capacity, he has given lectures on general management issues of corporate America. He is also one of the professors who composed the Economic Advisory Team of then-Governor George W. Bush’s 2000 Presidential Campaign.

In 2002, he became the Director of the IC2 Institute, an organization dedicated to the creation of new ventures throughout the world, where he also held the Herb Kelleher Chair for Entrepreneurship and Business and was the Sam Barshop Research Fellow. Butler served on the board of directors for Morehouse Research Institute in Atlanta, Georgia, and the Langston University National Institute for the Study of Minority Enterprise. In 2006, Butler was appointed by President Bush to the J. William Fulbright Scholarship Board; he was reappointed in 2007.

== Research and work ==
Butler's research has focused on entrepreneurship, organizational design, small businesses, African-American studies, and military sociology. Butler, called "America’s leading black business historian,'' published his book, Entrepreneurship and Self-Help Among Black Americans: A Reconsideration of Race and Economics, detailing the history and development of African-American business and enterprise.

=== Collaboration with Charles Moskos ===
In his book with the late Charles Moskos, All That We Can Be: Black Leadership and Racial Integration the Army Way, Butler examines the processes and outcomes of racial integration in the U.S. Army, providing a detailed analysis of how military structures foster leadership and opportunity for African Americans. The book is widely cited for its insights into the mechanisms of integration and its implications for broader societal change, winning the Washington Monthly Best Book Award.

Butler also collaborated with Moskos on a Symposium on Race in the U.S. Military, in which they examined racial disparities in the armed forces.

== Media appearances ==
Butler has appeared on over 30 radio and television programs, including "Eye On America" (CBS Nightly News), "The NewsHour With Jim Lehrer," CBS radio, "The Osgood Report," and public radio. His research has appeared in The Wall Street Journal, The New York Times, The Chicago Tribune, Time magazine, U.S. News & World Report, and other newspapers and magazines across America.

== Notable publications ==
- Butler, John Sibley. Entrepreneurship and Self-Help among Black Americans: A Reconsideration of Race and Economics. Rev. ed. Albany, NY: State Univ. of New York, 2005.
- Moskos, Charles C, and John S Butler. All That We Can Be : Black Leadership and Racial Integration the Army Way. First edition. Basic Books, 1996.
- Swed, O., & Butler, J. S. (2013). Military Capital in the Israeli Hi-tech Industry. Armed Forces & Society, 41(1), 123–141. https://doi.org/10.1177/0095327X13499562 (Original work published 2015)
- Butler, J. S., & Herring, C. (1991). Ethnicity and Entrepreneurship in America: Toward an Explanation of Racial and Ethnic Group Variations in Self-Employment. Sociological Perspectives, 34(1), 79–94. https://doi.org/10.2307/1389144 (Original work published 1991)
- Butler, J. S. (2024). The Science of Charles C. Moskos: From Institution to Occupation. Armed Forces & Society, 51(2), 476–481. https://doi.org/10.1177/0095327X241262206 (Original work published 2025)
