= Morten Ender =

Military sociologist

Morten Gaston Ender is an American sociologist and Professor of Sociology in the Department of Behavioral Sciences and Leadership at the United States Military Academy, West Point, New York, USA, and is known for his contributions to the teaching of undergraduate sociology and military sociology, particularly in the areas of military families, youth, and death and dying.

== Background ==
Ender grew up in southern California and graduated from high school in Leavenworth, Kansas. Ender moved to Germany and attended the University of Maryland European Division in Munich, Germany, where he received an AA in General Education. He received a BA in Sociology with Distinction and a post-undergraduate Certification in the Administration of Non-Profit Organizations from Sonoma State University.

After graduation, Morten did service work with Holocaust survivors in San Francisco, mentored at-risk youth, ran a shelter for the mentally ill homeless in Santa Rosa, California, and worked in conservation and trail construction in the North Cascades high country in Washington State and the Bavarian National Forest in Germany. He returned to his studies and completed his MA and PhD in Sociology at the University of Maryland, College Park.

== Career ==
Ender began his career teaching as a graduate student, and in 1995, took a position as Assistant Professor of Sociology and Peace Studies at the University of North Dakota in Grand Forks. In 1998, he transitioned to the Department of Behavioral Sciences and Leadership at the United States Military Academy, West Point, where he sits as Professor of Discipline. At West Point, he has served on multiple committees, including the Editorial Board for West Point Press.

He also mentors faculty, staff, and cadets and has created and led alternative Spring Breaks with cadets, including revitalization work in New Orleans following Hurricane Katrina. Ender has held visiting professor positions at the American College of Norway in Moss, Norway, and at the University of the Bundeswehr Munich in Munich, Germany. During his time at West Point, Ender championed the social sciences.

His courses include: The Sociology of Cadets; Sociological Theory through Film; The Military in Popular Culture; Military Families; Cinematic Images of War and the Military; and Armed Forces & Society. His newest course is titled Military Service and Nation. Over the course of his career, Morten Ender has been a reviewer for just over four dozen scholarly journals, including the American Journal of Sociology, Conflict Management and Peace Science, Military Psychology, Michigan Journal of Community Service Learning, and College Teaching. Additionally, he has been an editorial board member for the journals Armed Forces & Society, Res Militaris, and Teaching Sociology.

Ender has published over one hundred book chapters, research articles, opinion pieces, and books. He has delivered numerous invited lectures at universities and has given over 100 media interviews in the press, such as the New York Times, NPR, Stars & Stripes, and USAToday.

== Research and work ==
Morten Ender’s research in the field of teaching includes articles on undergraduate sociology, such as critiques of the national Introductory Sociology course and the advancement of experiential learning methods, including service-learning and game simulations. He is the editor of the volume Teaching and Learning the West Point Way: Educating the Next Generation of Leaders, featuring both his Armed Forces & Society course and his modified Monopoly family game.

His research line in military sociology spans topics such as military families, college youth, war and society, the experiences of “military brats,” and inclusion in the armed forces, among others. His work on military families explores the psychosocial impacts of deployment, family separation, and reintegration, as well as the coping mechanisms employed by military families, featured in his book Army Spouses: Military Families during the Global War on Terror.

His scholarship in military sociology has been widely recognized, with Ender receiving the Elaine Johnson Coates ('59) Award for national contributions to inclusion by a University of Maryland graduate; a 2022 Secretary of the Army Award; a Meritorious Civilian Service Medal; the Robin M. Williams, Jr. Award for Distinguished Contributions to Scholarship, Teaching, and Service; and back-to-back Outstanding Book Awards from the American Sociological Association's Peace, War, and Social Conflict Section for his books The American Soldier in Iraq and The Routledge Handbook of War and Society: Iraq and Afghanistan with Steve Carlton-Ford. At West Point, he is the recipient of The Dean's Award for Career Teaching Excellence; The Dean's Distinguished Scholarship Award; and the USMA’s Phi Kappa Phi Chapter Peter L. Zhu Scholastic Achievement Award.

== Notable publications ==
• Ender, Morten G. (2023). Army Spouses: Military Families during the Global War on Terror (Charlottesville and London: University of Virginia Press).

• Gosnell, Courtney L., Dennis R. Kelly, Morten G. Ender, and Michael D. Matthews (2020). “Character strengths and performance outcomes among military brat and non-brat cadets,” Military Psychology, 32(2):1-12.

• Belkin, Aaron, Morten G. Ender, Nathaniel Frank, Stacie Furia, George R. Lucas, Gary Packard, Steven M. Samuels, Tammy S. Schultz, and David R. Segal (2013). “Readiness and DADT repeal: Has the new policy of open service undermined the military?,” Armed Forces & Society, 39(4):587-601.

• Ender, Morten G. (2009) American Soldiers in Iraq: McSoldiers or Innovative Professionals? (NY and London: Routledge).

• Dolan, Carol A. and Morten G. Ender. (2008). “The coping paradox: Work, stress, and coping in the U.S. Army.” Military Psychology, 20(3):151-169.

• Ender, Morten G. (ed.) (2002). Military Brats and Other Global Nomads: Growing Up in Organization Families. (Westport, CT: Praeger).

• Hagen, Carol, Morten G. Ender, Kathleen A. Tiemann, and Clifford O. Hagen. (1999). “Graffiti on the plains: The Red River Valley flood of 1997.” Applied Behavioral Science Review, 7(2):145-158.

• Ender, Morten G. (1995). “G.I. phone home: The use of telecommunications by the soldiers of Operation Just Cause.” Armed Forces & Society, 21(3):335-334.
