= Swed =

Swed is a surname of English origin. Notable people with the surname include:

- Mark Swed (born 1945), American music critic
- Ori Swed, American professor
