= Military sociology =

Subfield within sociology which studies the military as a social group

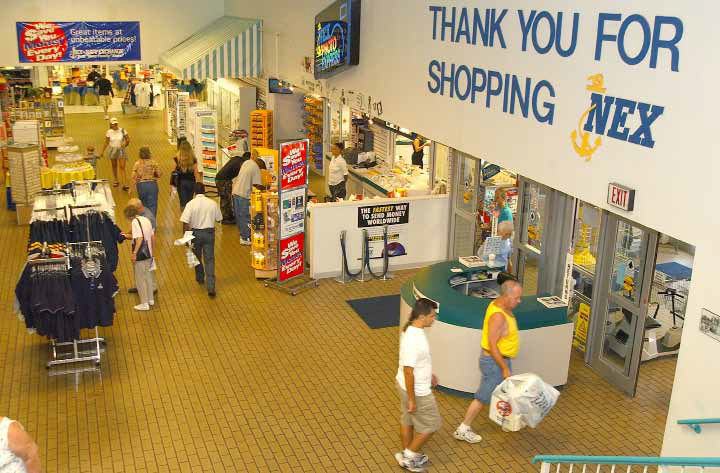
Inside a US Navy exchange within Guantanamo.

Military sociology is a subfield within sociology. It corresponds closely to C. Wright Mills's summons to connect the individual world to broader social structures. Military sociology aims toward the systematic study of the military as a social group rather than as a military organization. This highly specialized sub-discipline examines issues related to service personnel as a distinct group with coerced collective action based on shared interests linked to survival in vocation and combat, with purposes and values that are more defined and narrow than within civil society. Military sociology also concerns civil-military relations and interactions between other groups or governmental agencies.

== Theory and methodology ==
Military sociology reflects the diversity of methods employed by sociology itself. These include large-scale data analysis, participant observation, social network analysis, survey research, comparative history, case studies etc. The methods of military sociology also include philosophical perspectives and arguments.

== Contemporary military sociology ==
Contemporary military sociology is primarily a result of World War II and the Cold War. These events initiated the systematic study of military sociology, though it stands to reason that the relationship between the military and society would predate these events. The dismantling of the Soviet Union, the trauma of the terrorist attack on 11 September 2001 and the subsequent wars in Afghanistan and Iraq also dramatically affected the field of military sociology. There are numerous topics within military sociology and its scope is not exclusively limited to the military institution itself or to its members. Military sociology encompasses areas such as civilian-military relations and the relationship between the military and other military groups or governmental agencies.

Other topics within military sociology include:

- The dominant assumptions held by those in the military
- Military members' willingness/motivation to fight
- Unionization in the military
- Military professionalism
- Transition of veterans to civilian life
- The increased utilization of women
- The military industrial-academic complex
- The military's dependence on research
- The institutional and organizational structure of military

== Military as a society ==
=== Military as profession ===
Two leading scholars, Samuel Huntington and Morris Janowitz, influence the notion of military professionalism in military sociology. Political scientist, Huntington argued that there should be a high degree of autonomy within the military profession over military matters, because civilians did not possess the necessary corporate quality or expertise to oversee military matters. He called this objective control. Janowitz, on the other hand, asserted that the role of the military in modern society was so complex, and with such high stakes that the duty of the professional soldier went well beyond the execution of violence. The elite of the military had an obligation to maintain stable international relations, and this required management expertise and political skills in addition to the classical military officer skillset. Janowitz was concerned that the military profession could become a self-perpetuating, self-serving clique. Therefore, it was important that the military be socially representative of the citizen it served. According to Sam C. Sarkesian and Robert E. Connor, the military profession holds the view that it is a unique profession.

There are six key elements that are paramount in shaping the character of the military profession:

1. The profession has a defined area of competence based on expert knowledge;
2. there is a system of continuing education designed so as to maintain professional competence
3. The profession has an obligation to society and must serve it without concern for remuneration
4. It has a system of values that perpetuate professional character and establish and maintain legitimate relationships with society
5. There is an institutional framework within which the profession functions
6. The profession has control over the system of rewards and punishments and is in a position to determine the quality of those entering the profession

=== Military as an occupation ===
Shortly after the United States ended conscription and initiated the All Volunteer Force, sociologist, Charles Moskos introduced the Institutional/Occupational model of military organizations. He asked whether the military should be seen as more of an occupation rather than an institution. Although the military still retains institutional principles (patriotic values, historic traditions, etc.) the military is becoming oriented to the principles of business and economics and can be fairly categorized as a profession. This can be explored in relating to other professions in the grouping of power and compensation. There are different ranks within the military, granting some people more power. Many young people look to the military for compensation benefits and the opportunity to attend college without enormous loans.

Moskos used the United States as his point of reference. The militaries of countries such as France, Great Britain, Germany, Netherlands, and Australia also have elements of institutionalism. Moskos's model has influenced the scholarship of enlistment/reenlistment, which looks at how occupational and institutional factors shape a recruit's enlistment intention or the reenlistment decisions of active duty personnel.

=== Recruitment practices ===
Perhaps no other institution places as much emphasis on procedures for assimilating new members as does the armed forces. Assimilation involves the continuous process of recruitment, selection, training, and career development. Not only must the new recruit, officer, or enlisted officer learn new and difficult skills. He or she is also expected to master an elaborate code of professional behavior and etiquette, since membership in the military means participation in an organizational community which regulates behavior both on and off the "job". The American Military utilizes the citizen-soldier concept to gather military personnel from across the country. This term means the ability to quickly round up or call up troops for war or military tour at a virtual moment's notice. But once the assignment or tour is over, the military personnel are returned to civilian life.

According to Norman A. Hilman 2.5 million men were enlisted into military during the peacetime draft. During that rapid transitional period, many soldiers may have felt lost or confused by the differences in their previous life (civilian) and their new military life, which calls for a demand to conform to new orders that are expected to be followed without question. Although, there were many men and now women who have voluntarily joined in the armed forces, there are those who view joining the military and working for the government as selling out. The negative characterization of military life can be a real turn off for most people looking from the outside. Despite the negative thoughts about military life and the incentives of economic security, military recruitment practices changed from a means to help one's country into a way to attain an education back to a need to serve one's country, in recent years. Throughout its changes the enlisting numbers have not declined, they have stayed steady, if not increasing over the years.

=== The effects of military life on dependents (and the influence of military dependent subcultures) ===
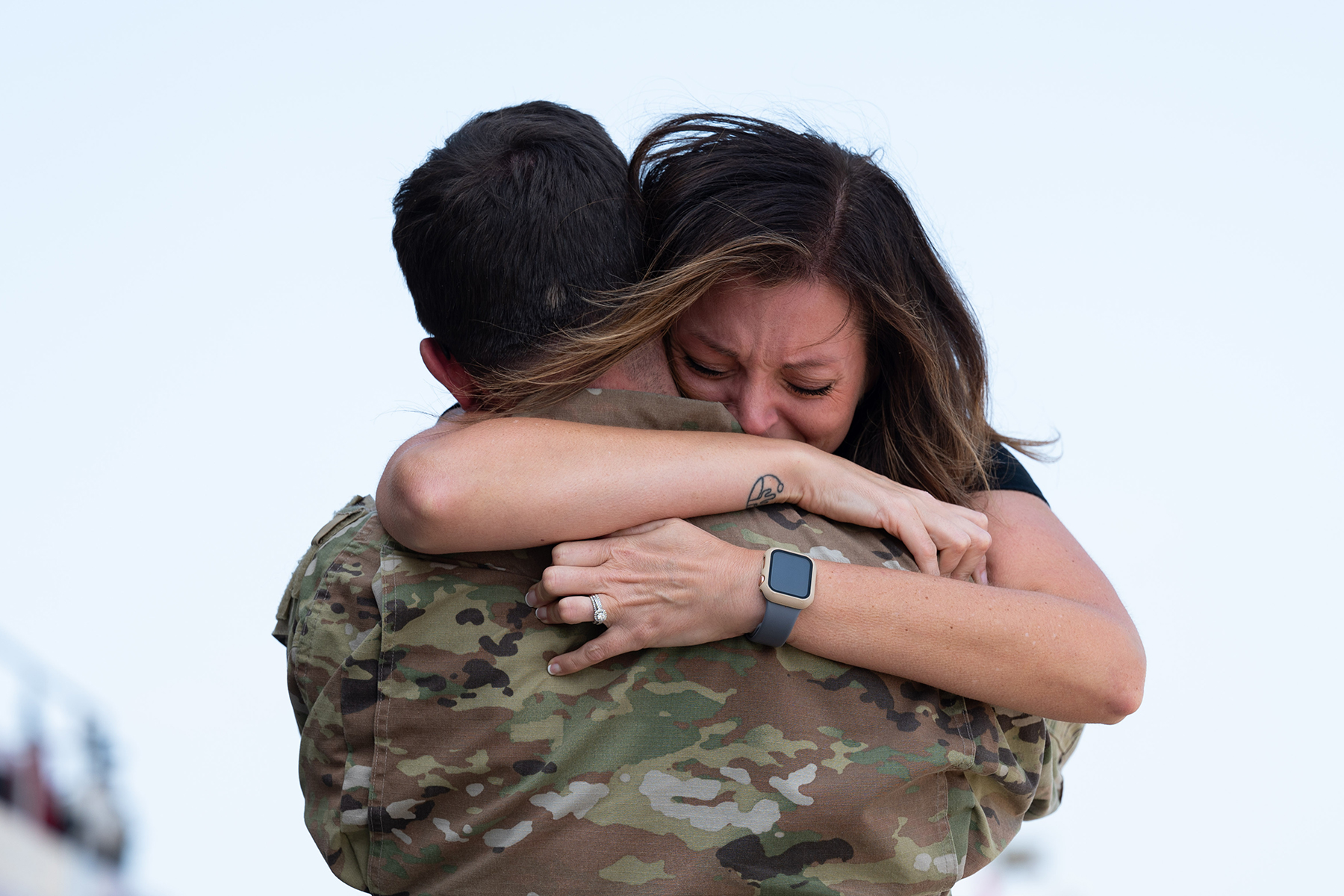
A U.S. Air Force Airman is welcomed home after deployment by a family member at Joint Base Charleston, South Carolina, October 2023.

A military family by definition is a unit that may consist of husband and wife and children (in many English-speaking countries, called military brats, which is a term of respect and endearment, not an insult); with either the husband and/or wife as the primary military enlisted. The emotional stress that a partner can experience, before, during and after a soldier, sailor, marine or airman's deployment is perhaps just as bad mentally, as the one who is fighting in the military. Those whose husbands or wives were deployed for the first time, rated their feelings about the whole experience as being very sad, and found it difficult to cope with the sudden absence of their loved one. However, women or men whose spouses have been deployed prior, coped with the present deployment with more positive reactions. They felt that they had a job to do away from home that was important and they and the rest of their family (children) had to be supportive and take care of things while the family member was away. Children begin taking on more adult responsibilities like: cooking, cleaning, getting groceries, etc. Despite the positive coping skills of some military families, some do not do well on their own coping with the long separation from their family and family members. Stressors and stress reactions of spouses vary over time. What is perceived as stressful before the deployment differs from what is perceived as stressful during and after the deployment. Deployments can last anywhere from 90 days to 15 months, and during this time, the role that the members of the family believe they should hold changes. This often makes it difficult for all members of the family.

Approximately one-fifth of all enlisted 18-year-olds and one-third of all junior personnel in the United States Army are married, compared to less than 5% of civilian 18-year-olds. As a result, young military families experience many of the same hardships that can accompany the start of a family in greater numbers than young civilian families. Like young civilian families, young military families may also experience maturity issues, life inexperience, low incomes, and living away from home. But these issues are compounded by the fact that young military families also experience special hardships not experienced by young civilian families. For example, while many young families, both military and civilian, often endure difficulties, civilian families are more likely to have the support of family and friends which is less likely to be an option for military families (e.g. on a military base stationed in a foreign country).

Another hardship experienced more commonly by military families (compared with civilian families) is frequent relocation. Approximately 33% of military families relocate every year compared to only 5% of civilian families. Special planning must be undertaken by families in which both parents are on active duty, as either could be (re)deployed at any time. (Planning for this contingency can be especially difficult.) In other military families with only one active-duty-parent, the other parent is less likely to stay at home with children as in the past. Rather, they are more likely to find employment and/or attend college, and therefore find constant relocations more stressful due to the commitments to working and studying, respectively.

Military families have the option of living at the parents' place of employment. For families living in an on-base house, they must follow the rules of the base command and the housing office on how to maintain their property and are afforded little privacy. In short, they may experience pressure to conform to the base's standards of behavior. Some families may opt not to live on base, but off-base housing is usually more expensive and can be inconvenient.

=== Stress and military service ===
De Soir suggests there are seven stages in the way partners of married personnel experience stress before, during and after deployment.

Initial Shock and Protest
This period usually lasts about two weeks. In this stage family members are upset and angry at the news of deployment. This is usually a time of heightened emotions. In the past many families were only given a month's notice to get ready for deployment, but recently many families have been given a year or more of notice of deployment, which might make the stressful time of anticipation even worse. Many recent reports suggest the ideal preparation time for deployment would be 3–5 months.

Disengagement and Alienation
During the last days prior to departure, couples enter this stage. They experience periods of distancing because of their feelings uncertainty about the future of the mission, but also during that stage, a lot of latent problems or concern may surface that could add more potential stress, such as arguments and confessions that can't be address fully in those last moments before a person's deployment. These moments create a lot of emotional distress.

Emotional Disorganization
Shortly after the family member has been deployed, there are feelings of sadness and it is possible that symptoms of clinical depression may begin, along with issues with sleeping and problems getting back into the rhythm of life (eating disorders). These issues last for about six weeks, perhaps longer, especially, if the deployment doesn't go well or there are reports of bad news to the family. The best way to get family and spouses over this period, is for the deployed personnel to contact their family as soon as they arrive at their destinations as soon as military authority permits. This can help the family feel less stress over the deployment duration. Constant contact is a key part to decreasing a stressful family life.

Recovery and Stabilization
Usually after six weeks the family will fall back into a more distressed family pattern, and recover by becoming accustomed to the situation of a missing family member who has been deployed. Starting and maintaining a daily routine at this stage is the best way to keep the mind off of what the deployed may be doing or where the deployed may be at this point. The involvement of "home front groups" are essential to military families who need to share and enjoy time with others who have military spouses and partners deployed for long periods of time. Seeking support groups are one of many ways people cope with stressful issues.

=== Age as a factor ===
In the United States, almost half of the enlisted force is below 25 for both men and women with the average age being 27. The trend of youth is perpetuated by the fact that most people enter into the service at 18 years of age and leave after only a few years. This creates a situation in which those with college experience are underrepresented in military as they only make up 8.5% of the military force. Youth inclusion in armed conflict is not a new concept or one restricted to large well organized forces such as the United States military. In various societies over time, youth has been prized in armed conflict. Such instances include the Dinka of the Sudan, boys who received spears as an initiation rite between sixteen and eighteen years of age, the nineteenth-century Cheyenne who joined their first war parties when they were about fourteen, and the female warriors of Dahomey who were recruited between nine and fifteen. During the American Civil War, it has been estimated that between 250,000 and 420,000 soldiers under 18 years of age served in Union and Confederate armies, which yields somewhere between 10 and 20 percent of recruits. During these earlier periods youth was not looked upon in the context of innocence as it is framed today, rather children were seen as naturally existing with adults, as they frequently coexisted with them through apprenticeships and other work. It was not until formal education became more widespread that a change in attitudes towards youth develop, and consequently a prolongation of the perceived youth period.

=== Religion in the military ===
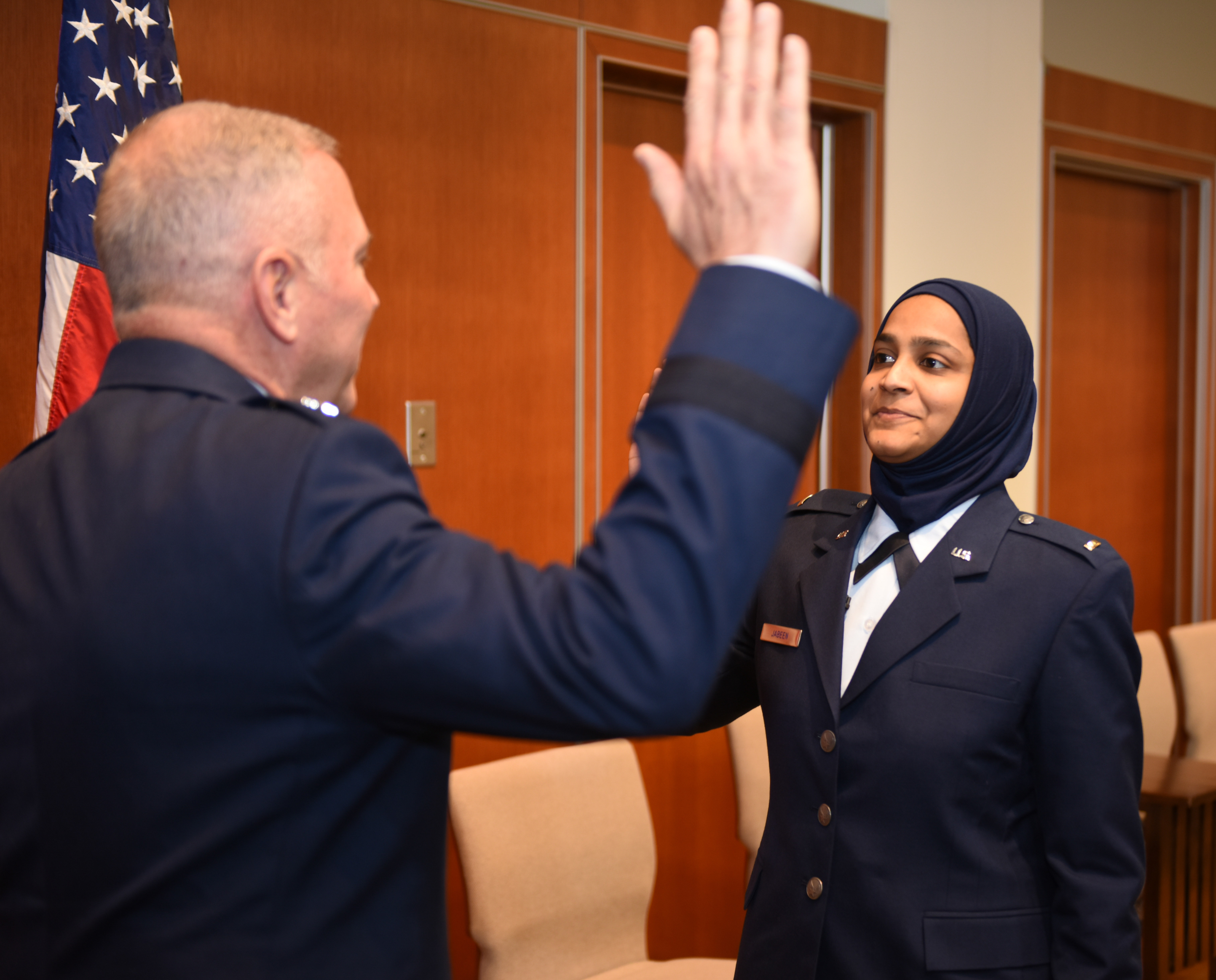
A U.S. Air Force chaplain candidate is commissioned at the Catholic Theological Union, Chicago, Illiniois, December 2019.

In the past, all U.S. service academies required attendance to religious services which in 1972 was found to be unconstitutional by the U.S. Court of Appeals for the District of Columbia Circuit in Anderson v. Laird. Despite this, the Naval Academy still has prayer before meals and attendance is required at these meals. This has caused some students at the Naval Academy to seek legal help from the American Civil Liberties Union. A comparable practice of pre-meal prayers for compulsory meals at the Virginia Military Institute was found unconstitutional by the 4th U.S. Circuit Court of Appeals in Mellen v. Bunting in 2003.

The religious spectrum of the United States military is comparable to that of the general population. In comparison with the nearest available age group, a demographic of 20- to 39-year-olds that make up eighty percent of the military, there are slight variations. Mainline Protestants, Catholics, Jews, Muslims, and Buddhists are underrepresented, but other Christian religions (such as the Christian and Missionary Alliance, Church of God, Seventh Day Adventists, Assemblies of God, and others) disproportionately overrepresented, at nearly three times the percentage in the applicable demographic. Those reporting atheism or no religion are very slightly overrepresented. None of these differences account for more than a 10% spread, Christians self-identifying as Protestant only constituting the largest discrepancy. The data and other studies suggest that servicemembers may be less likely to identify with mainstream religious organizations than the country's general population.

=== Minorities in the military ===
Throughout history non-indigenous members of minority groups have been absorbed into military service. Examples of this practice in ancient armies include Hannibal's use of Ethiopian soldiers, the Roman Auxilia, the Byzantine Empire's recruitment of the Middle Eastern population, and the Ottoman Empire's use of religious minorities through the Millet system. In these cases where military service was voluntary, minorities saw it as an opportunity to progress socially in the society, and perhaps achieve citizenship for themselves and by extension, to their children. For most of the history of minority groups in military organizations, minorities were often segregated from the dominant racial group by forming separate contingents for such groups. This was true in ancient military organizations, but also in a more recent historical context through the French-Canadian regiments of Canada during World War I, and World War II, the British army and their conscription of various minority groups from their conquests during colonialism, and the segregation of minority groups into Caucasian commanded, minority composed, regiments during similar time periods as mentioned previously. In the case of the United States, African-American participation in the military after World War II was high due to the better treatment afforded African-Americans in the military by Caucasian members. With the end of job exclusion by 1954 reenlistment rates increased on average until they were close to double that of Caucasian servicemen. A similar situation arose in the United Kingdom with minority participation, but both situations saw a sharp disparity in upper rank distribution, as both had, and to a lesser extent, still have a disproportionately low level of upper ranked minorities.

| | Countries with special programmes for minorities in the military | Countries with parallel military structures for its two or more groups of equal status | Countries with no special programmes for minorities in the military |
|---|---|---|---|
| Example Countries | USA, Australia and New Zealand | Canada, UK, Switzerland and Belgium | France, Germany, Spain, Romania and Bulgaria |
| Characteristics | There are active measures taken to ensure balanced representation, the lower ranks are integrated much more than officers | Units constituted on the basis of identity, usually the different groups have played a role in the founding of the nation | Units constituted without regard to minority status, emphasises the interests of the dominant national community and there may be many minorities in the military but very few as officers |
| Possible advantages | Have policies to ensure equal opportunity in the military | Parallel structures help during an internal crisis where units are identified with the local population and during foreign war, highlight the contribution of minorities to a national military effort | Greater cohesion in the military |
| Possible disadvantages | May lead to minorities being over represented | Requires more money for training and administration | Minority rights are treated as a non-issue or are violated |

=== Women in the military ===
Military and gender issues is a diverse and plural field within military sociology. The roles of women can include being the transmitter of cultural values to children, reproducers of boundaries and active militants in national struggles. Women have served in the military throughout history. Women's military recruitment rejects the idea that 'women should be protected'. Recruitment is very important in Latin America, Israel, Nicaragua, Rwanda and Northern Ireland. In Turkey, the wife of the chief commander represents the mother of the military family. Some states in the developing world are egalitarian and many women are recruited into the military to achieve the modern ideal. With women's customary role as a nurturer and mother, the increased equality and inclusion of women in the military could change the reason for war or raison d'être of wars.

Sexual assault in the United States military is an issue for military women. In 2021, 8% of female military personnel experienced unwanted sexual contact. This was the highest percentage since the DoD began this data collection in 2004. Of an estimated 35,900 total sexual assaults, only 7,260 were reported. The reporting rate was 20%, which had fallen from 30% in 2018. Only 42% of cases resulted in court-martial proceedings. The confidence of female personnel in being treated "with dignity and respect" by their chain of command after reporting an assault was 39%, a decrease from 66% in 2018.

During World War II women served in the Women's Army Auxiliary Corp (WAAC) which was later renamed Women's Army Corps (WAC). In addition, there was WAVES, or Women Accepted for Volunteer Emergency Services.

Jane Addams and Cynthia Enloe have been identified as women who have contributed key ideas to military sociology. Addams's influence stems from her feminist perspectives on peace and its influence on peacekeeping. Enloe's influence is traced to her feminist view of the military.

=== Homosexuality and the military ===
Homosexuals were not recruited but have served in the U.S. military from World War II (and most likely every war) to the Clinton presidency. In 1993, the Clinton administration began the policy of "Don't ask, Don't tell, Don't pursue", meaning that military personnel will be neither compelled ("Don't ask") nor allowed ("Don't tell") nor harassed ("Don't pursue") to disclose or discuss their sexual identity while serving in the military. The "Don't ask, Don't tell, Don't pursue" policy actually had the effect of increasing discharges due to homosexuality from 617 in 1994 to 1,273 in 2001. Estimates have been made that in 2000 there were 1 million gay and lesbian veterans in the U.S. population as based on census information. Homosexual women with partners reported higher rates of military service than other women, while homosexual male veterans served for a similar amount of time as heterosexual male veterans.

== Military and society ==
=== Political control of the military ===
In the modern relationship between the military and the state, the state relies on the military to protect it from external threats as well as violence between various internal groups. Concurrently, the military draws so-called 'violent resources' from the state and from society. Such resources can include money, technology, raw materials, and manpower. The relationship has changed somewhat from the 16th and 17th centuries, however, where internal centers of power and specific sectors of society (e.g., skilled builders or guilds) were somewhat more autonomous than the rest. These sectors were not under the direct control of the sovereign power and could avoid feeding resources to the state. This meant that pre-modern militaries were 1) somewhat weaker than the modern version due to a lack of state-funded resources but also 2) powerful sectors of society that controlled certain privately funded resources and which could raise their own mercenary forces if needed. As this system began to evolve, states started to exert more control over society by exploiting 'existential fears' which led to the creation of various bureaucratic methods including mass conscription, tax systems, and territorial centralization. The result is that various civil sectors began to work exclusively for the state, which in turn desired a stronger military, and which used these sectors to extract more resources and more manpower for exclusive military use. This 'modern' military now was reliant on the state for its very existence, whereas, in pre-modern times, the military could be the tool of various autonomous sectors of society.

=== Military's use of research and industry ===
Burkard Schmitt a Research Fellow for the EU Institute for Security Studies identifies two types of research. Pure research is done from the bottom-up with no specific demand and are long term oriented. Capability research is done from the top down, most research of this type is defined for mostly military use with a specific goal in mind.

Europe

Few European countries have had significant investments in research and technology. National sensitivities and defense companies that are hesitant to share research findings has long hindered research in Europe. This is beginning to change with the formation and strengthening of the EU and the Common Security and Defence Policy (CSDP). The EU is currently implementing its "Agenda for advanced research relating to global security" which is crucial to the future of European security. The idea in Europe is that research should be undertaken by all member states. A goal for member states and something to aid future research is a "harmonization" of military requirements.

United States

The American model for research is based on the old German standard, which the Americans emulated starting from the founding of the American Chemical Society in 1876. The use of research and industry to develop new and more deadly chemical and biological weapons is an intriguing aspect of the modern military. German universities were involved in early chemical gas development for use in World War I. German universities "carefully cultivated the ideal of science as an emphatically value-free activity; they bestowed upon their wards the right and the duty to serve the interests of knowledge and to brush aside other interests with which the welfare of scientific pursuits might clash." American universities also had chemical labs, Harvard University began work on poison gas in 1917. By World War I, the chemical industry began to influence politics because of the great interdependence between industry, military and politics.

The amount of research that is done relates to the U.S. economy, which includes the largest military budget in the world. This has created a strong link between military, the state, and corporate America. This has been called the "military industrial complex", but the military has also dominated large university science departments. This concept is the military industrial academic complex, or MIA.

== Notable scholars ==
The following scholars have published widely in military sociology. Many have held editorial responsibilities for the journal Armed Forces & Society and leadership positions in the professional organization the Inter-University Seminar on Armed Forces and Society (IUS).

- Morris Janowitz, founder Inter-University Seminar on Armed Forces and Society and founder and Editor-in-Chief Armed Forces & Society
- David R. Segal, Editor-in-Chief Armed Forces & Society, President and Chair Inter-University Seminar on Armed Forces and Society
- James Burk, Editor-in-Chief Armed Forces & Society, President and Chair Inter-University Seminar on Armed Forces and Society
- Charles Moskos, President and Chair Inter-University Seminar on Armed Forces and Society
- Mady Wechsler Segal (Military Families and Women in the Military)
- Brenda Moore (Women and Minorities), editorial board Armed Forces & Society
- Joseph Soeters (Peacekeeping and Methods) editorial board Armed Forces & Society
- Giuseppe Caforio
- John Sibley Butler (minority participation in the military)
- Bernard Boene, editorial board Armed Forces & Society
- Morton Ender, editorial board Armed Forces & Society
- Meredith Kleycamp (recruitment)
- Nicholas Jans (Professionalism), editorial board Armed Forces & Society
- Christopher Dandeker (Veterans), editorial board Armed Forces & Society
- Gerhard Kümmel, editorial board Armed Forces & Society
- Paul Camacho (veterans), editorial board Armed Forces & Society
- Guy Siebold (cohesion)
- Thomas Crosbie, editorial board Armed Forces & Society
- Anthony King (combat and cohesion), editorial board Armed Forces & Society
- Yagil Levy, Editorial board Armed Forces & Society
- Patricia M. Shields, Editor-in-Chief, Armed Forces & Society
- Ori Swed, Editor-in-Chief, Armed Forces & Society
- George Kaffes, Professor of Military Sociology at the Hellenic Army Academy, https://sse.army.gr/wp-content/uploads/2022/12/CVeng-1.pdf

== See also ==
- Bullying in the military

== Recommended reading ==
- Armed Forces & Society
- Caforio, Giuseppe, (ed.), Handbook of the Sociology of the Military, Kluwer Academic/Plenum Publishers, 2006
- Grandstaff, Mark. "Military Sociology" in Charles Messenger, ed. Reader's Guide to Military History (2001) pp 363–64 online; evaluates major books
- Kaffes, George. 2024 "Dictionary of Military Sociology". USA, Dorrance Publishing Co.
- Malesevic, Sinisa. 2010. The Sociology of War and Violence. Cambridge: Cambridge University Press.
- Paparone, Chris. 2013. The Sociology of Military Science. NY: Bloomsbury.
- Sarkesian, Sam C., Williams, John Allen, Bryant, Fred B., Soldiers, Society, and National Security, Lynne Rienner Publishers, Boulder, 1995
