= Sam C. Sarkesian =

Scholar on the military (1927–2011)

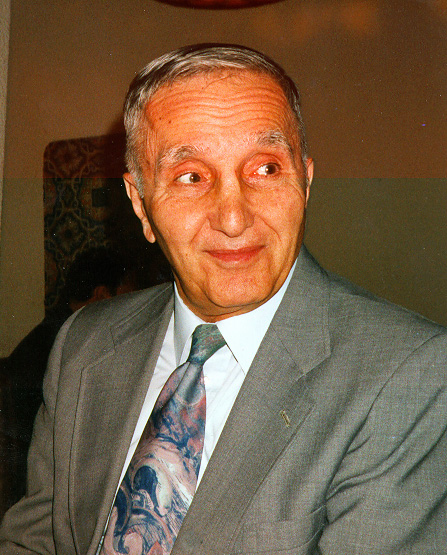
- Born: November 7, 1927; Chicago, Illinois, U.S.
- Died: September 26, 2011 (aged 83)

Philosophical work
- Main interests: Military sociology, civil–military relations

Sam Charles Sarkesian (November 7, 1927 – September 26, 2011) was a prominent scholar of civil-military relations and national security, who published numerous books and articles concerning various topics in these areas. He was also a member of the military, serving in Korea and Vietnam. He retired from the U.S. Army (Airborne/Special Forces/Infantry) as a Lieutenant Colonel. He was also a professor emeritus of political science at Loyola University Chicago, where he was the chair of the political science department and influenced many new scholars in the field. He also served as the second president of the Inter-University Seminar on Armed Forces & Society (IUS). His memory is strong in the IUS, as many of its fellows were his students.

== Biography ==
Sarkesian was known among the members of the IUS as the embodiment of the soldier-scholar, serving in the armed forces for twenty-two years. Born in Chicago, Illinois, he enlisted in the U.S. Army on November 11, 1944, at the age of seventeen. His service in the U.S. Armed Forces began as a member of the 14th constabulary force in Germany after the end of World War II. He returned to the U.S. to study at The Citadel. After graduating with honors in 1951, he was commissioned as a Second Lieutenant in the U.S. Army and became one of the first men selected by the legendary Colonel Aaron Bank to join the 10th Special Forces, led by Bank himself whose wartime mission would be to operate behind the Iron Curtain. In this capacity he also served on an island above the 38th parallel on the west coast of North Korea during the Korean War. Sarkesian's experiences in the Korean War were formative in the development of his ideas concerning the opportunities and limitations of unconventional warfare. He then joined the 11th Airborne Division for service in Germany and the First Infantry Division in Vietnam. He then taught in the Social Sciences department of the U.S. Military Academy at West Point. Sarkesian's personal decorations include the Bronze Star Medal with Combat V Device and Oak Leaf Cluster, the Legion of Merit, and the Army Commendation Medal. He was one of the last combat infantry men to receive glider qualification and was a master parachutist with 85 jumps. He received his master's in 1962 and doctorate in 1969 from Columbia University in political science. After returning to Chicago he met Morris Janowitz, the founder of the Inter-University Seminar on Armed Forces and Society, who handpicked Sarkesian to be the next IUS president. He served for five years (1982–1989). He was awarded the Morris Janowitz Career Achievement Award in 2005 by the IUS.

== Scholarly contributions ==
Sam Sarkesian's major contributions to civil-military relations and national security studies can be found in key publications. In The Professional Army Officer in a Changing Society (1975) Sarkesian provides a valuable supplement to Janowitz's The Professional Soldier published fifteen years earlier. This work filled a "persisting gap" in the literature of military sociology, providing a description of the operations of U.S. military system, as well as a description of the "shadow world" of the service family. In Beyond The Battlefield (1981) Sarkesian examines what military professionalism means in the post-Vietnam era, arguing for a reconceptualization of professionalism beyond technical skill, including "political humanistic dimensions." Moreover, the U.S. military is a political institution; the changing nature of warfare, from total war to limited war, necessarily implies that revolutionary 3rd world missions are political and must be dealt with as such. In America's Forgotten Wars (1984) Sarkesian argued that low-intensity conflicts would "dominate the future" rather than large conventional wars. Moreover, Sarkesian argued that U.S. strategic thought largely failed to learn the lessons of low-intensity conflicts. In The U.S. Military Profession into the Twenty-First Century (2006) Sarkesian and Connor explored ways in which the U.S. military could cope with the 21st century threat environment. This new environment poses specific challenges to the professionalism of the U.S. military, which requires the U.S. military to embrace a dual role of both traditional war-fighting, as well as other activities such as peacekeeping and nation building.

== Notable publications ==
Sam C. Sarkesian has published 63 works in 172 publications in 3 languages and 70,68 library holdings. According to WorldCat, Sarkesian's most widely held library publications are:

- The Military-Industrial Complex: A Reassessment
- U.S. National Security: Policymakers, Processes, and Politics
- America's Forgotten War: The Counterrevolutionary Past and Lessons for the Future
- Revolutionary Guerrilla Warfare
- Beyond the Battlefield: The New Military Professionalism
- The Professional Army Officer in a Changing Society
- Defense Policy and the Presidency: Carter's First Years
- Presidential Leadership and National Security: Style, Institutions, and Politics
- Combat EffectivenessL Cohesion, Stress, and the Volunteer Military
- The U.S. Military Profession into the Twenty-First Century War, Peace and Politics
- U.S. National Security Policy and Strategy: Documents and Policy Proposals
- U.S. Policy and Low-Intensity Conflict: Potentials for Military Struggles in the 1980s
- Nonnuclear Conflicts in the Nuclear Age
- The Army in a New Security Era
- The U.S. Military Profession into the Twenty-First Century: War, Peace, and Politics
