= David R. Segal =

American sociologist (born 1941)

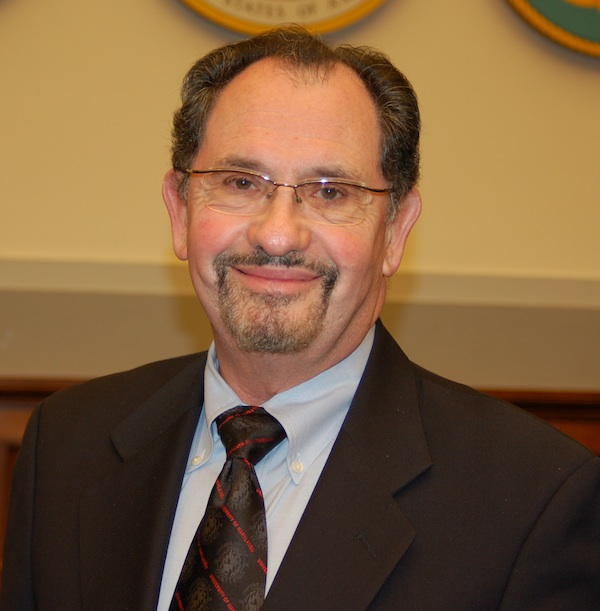
- Segal in 2008
- Born: 1941 (age 83–84)

Philosophical work
- Main interests: Military sociology; Civil-military relations

David R. Segal (born 1941) is an American sociologist who specializes in civil-military relations, military sociology, and military organization, in the tradition of Morris Janowitz. He is a distinguished scholar-teacher and professor emeritus of sociology at the University of Maryland. He is the founding director of the Center for Research on Military Organization, and is a former president of the Inter-University Seminar on Armed Forces and Society, as well as a former editor of the journal Armed Forces & Society. He has also served as president of the District of Columbia Sociological Society and of the Section on Armed Forces and Conflict Resolution of the International Sociological Association, and chair of the Section on Peace, War, and Social Conflict of the American Sociological Association. He attended public school in Brooklyn, New York, and earned his B.A. from Harpur College, Binghamton University. He earned a PhD in sociology at University of Chicago. He began his academic career in the sociology department at the University of Michigan in 1966, and served as director of graduate studies, associate chair of the department, and director of the Center for Research on Social Organization. in 1973, he took a leave of absence from Michigan to direct the sociology program at the U.S. Army Research Institute for the Behavioral and Social Sciences.

== Notability ==
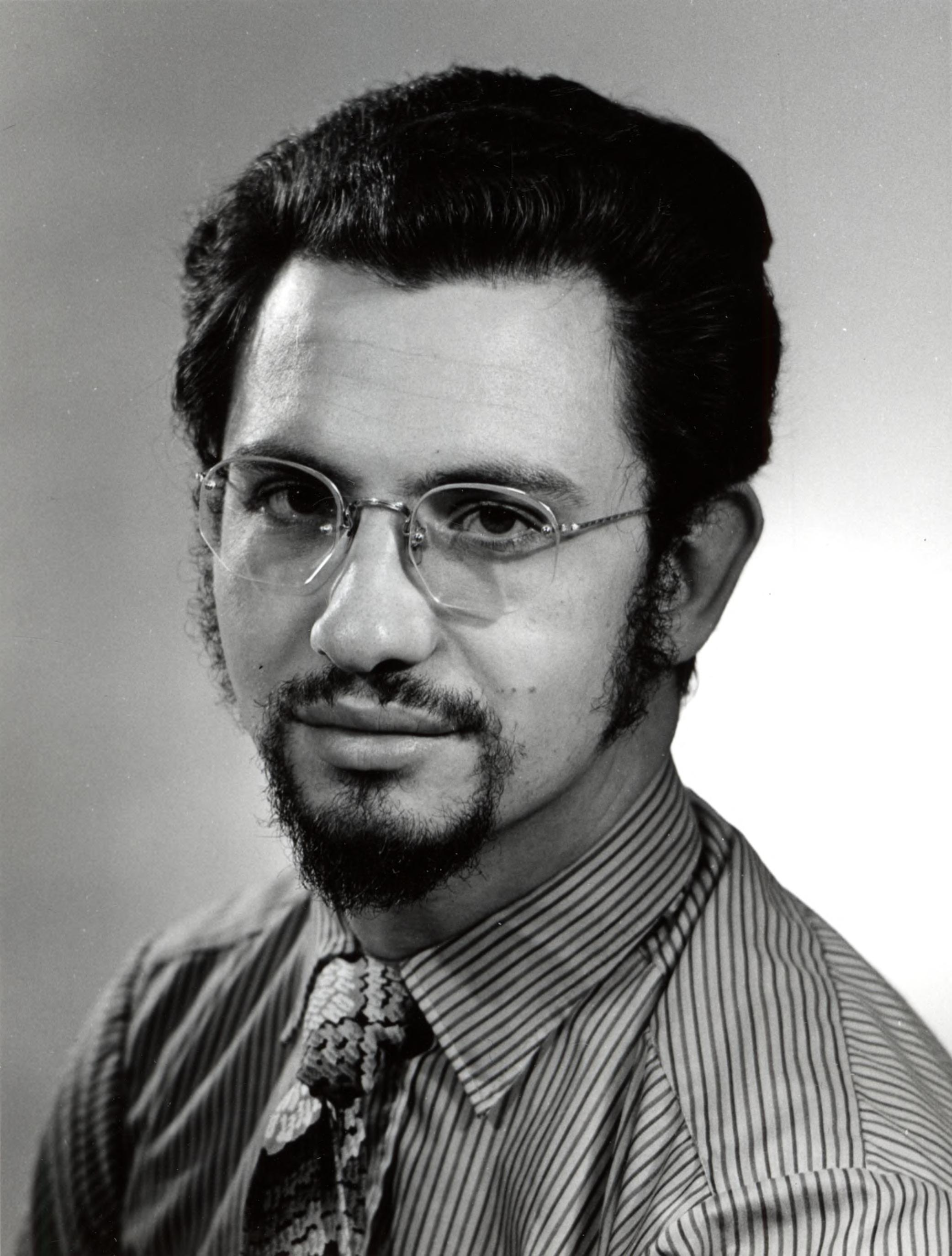
Segal in 1971

David Segal has influenced defense policy through research, consultation, and service work, having twice been awarded the Department of the Army Medal for Outstanding Civilian Service in 1989 and 2000. In the early years of the all-volunteer force (1973–75) he directed the army's sociological research program. In the late 1980s he was a distinguished visiting professor at West Point. in the mid-1990s he was a special assistant for peace operations to the Army Chief of Staff. In 2007, he won the Morris Janowitz Career Achievement Award from the Inter-University Seminar on Armed Forces & Society. His most notable works include Recruiting for Uncle Sam, The Postmodern Military (co-authored with Charles Moskos and John Allen Williams), Peacekeepers and Their Wives (coauthored with Mady Wechsler Segal), and the four volume anthology, Military Sociology (co-authored with James Burk)

He worked with the White House during the Obama administration on military spouse issues, has frequently testified to Congress on diversity in the military and social science contributions to national security, and has been a consultant to several federal agencies. Since retirement, he has served as a Selective Service Board member, as a member of the Army Educational Advisory Committee, and as a consultant to NATO on the nature of the military profession.

== Notable publications ==
- The Postmodern Military (co-editor with Charles Moskos and John Allen Williams). New York: Oxford University Press. 2000
- Peacekeepers and their Wives (with Mady Wechsler Segal). Westport: Greenwood Press.1993.
- The Transformation of European Communist Societies (co-editor with Louis Kriesberg). Greenwich: JAI Press, 1992.
- Recruiting for Uncle Sam: Citizenship and Military Manpower Policy. Lawrence: University Press of Kansas, 1989.
- Life in the Rank and File: Enlisted Men and Women in the Armed Forces of the United States, Australia, Canada, and the United Kingdom (co-editor with H. W. Sinaiko). New York:Pergamon, 1986.
- The All-Volunteer Force: A Study of Ideology in the Military (with Jerald G. Bachman and John D. Blair). Ann Arbor: University of Michigan Press, 1977.
- The Social Psychology of Military Service (co-editor with Nancy Goldman). Beverly Hills; Sage Publications, 1976.
- Society and Politics. Glenview, Ill.; Scott, Foresman, 1974
