= Ori Swed =

Ori Swed is an associate professor at the Department of Sociology, Anthropology, and Social Work at Texas Tech University. Swed is a political sociologist and an organization scholar who studies the role of organizations in human security and the privatization of aid and security. He is the Director of the Peace, War, and Social Conflict Laboratory (PWSCL) at Texas Tech, and he is the Director of the Texas Security Center (TEXSEC). In 2024, he replaced Pat Shields as the Editor-in-Chief of the interdisciplinary journal Armed Forces & Society.

== Background ==
Ori Swed earned his BA in History and Sociology and MA in History from the Hebrew University in 2007 and 2010, respectively. In 2016, Swed earned his Ph.D. in Sociology at the University of Texas at Austin, where his dissertation focused on the role of nongovernmental organizations in conflict areas and their impact on human rights violations.

== Career ==
While working as a Lecturer at the University of Texas, he established the Peace, War, and Social Conflict Laboratory (PWSCL). In 2018, he joined the Department of Sociology, Anthropology, and Social Work at Texas Tech as an assistant professor, bringing the Peace, War, and Social Conflict Laboratory with him. In 2024, Swed served as the Chair of the Peace, War, & Social Conflict Section at the American Sociological Association, after several years of holding different leadership positions within the association.

== Research ==
Swed’s research spans a diverse range of topics and uses a broad variety of research methods and approaches. His work brings together sociological foundations and points of view on emerging security phenomena. His work includes the study of organizational culture and change, the outsourcing of war, violent non-state actors (VNSAs), the role of nongovernmental organizations (NGOs) in spreading international norms and standards, and cyber and influence operations.

However, Swed’s primary areas of research are VNSAs’ adoption of drone technology and the increased prevalence of private military contractors. He published several UN reports, in collaboration with Dr. Daniel Burland, on the private military and security industry, an edited volume on the topic, and many other articles and essays. Additionally, in some of his PWSCL’s projects, he has been focusing on mapping private military security companies around the world, examining who they are, where they operate, and their capabilities and roles. This information makes up a dataset of over 1,700 companies across the globe.

Swed has also conducted extensive research on VNSAs’ adoption of drone technology. He, along with Dr. Kerry Chavez, explored this using a dataset of nearly 1,000 armed nonstate actors, examining how this technology came to be utilized by VNSAs, the security threat emerging out of this trend, and how states mimic this usage.

Lastly, Swed studies online spaces in the context of armed conflict, terrorism, and propaganda, looking at disinformation and influence operations. His work examines the emerging role of AI in those fields as well as the increasing role of violent nonstate actors in this domain.

== Armed Forces & Society Editorship ==
In 2024, following the retirement of past Editor-in-Chief Pat Shields, the Inter-University Seminar on Armed Forces and Society (IUS) announced that Dr. Ori Swed would become the next Editor-in-Chief of the journal Armed Forces & Society. Swed had been an IUS fellow and an editorial board member, contributor, and reviewer for the journal for over 10 years.

Swed's interdisciplinary background and expertise in civil-military relations, innovative research methods, and military organizations were considered during the selection process. The journal is now housed at Texas Tech University under the Texas Security Center.

== Notable Publications ==
- Swed, Ori. “The Afghanistan War’s Legacy: The Reimagining of the Outsourcing of War and Security.” Armed Forces and Society 49, no. 4 (2023): 1027–34. https://doi.org/10.1177/0095327X221101340.
- Chávez, Kerry, and Ori Swed. “The Empirical Determinants of Violent Nonstate Actor Drone Adoption.” Armed Forces and Society 50, no. 4 (2024): 883–912. https://doi.org/10.1177/0095327X231164570.
- Swed, Ori, and Daniel Burland. “Contractors in Iraq: Exploited Class or Exclusive Club?” Armed Forces and Society 48, no. 1 (2022): 3–24. https://doi.org/10.1177/0095327X20927471.
- Crosbie, Thomas, and Ori Swed. The Sociology of Privatized Security. Palgrave Macmillan, 2019.
- Chávez, Kerry, and Ori Swed. “The Proliferation of Drones to Violent Nonstate Actors.” Defence Studies 21, no. 1 (2021): 1–24. https://doi.org/10.1080/14702436.2020.1848426.
- Swed, Ori, and John Sibley Butler. “Military Capital in the Israeli Hi-Tech Industry.” Armed Forces and Society 41, no. 1 (2015): 123–41. https://doi.org/10.1177/0095327X13499562.
- Chávez, Kerry, and Ori Swed. “Emulating Underdogs: Tactical Drones in the Russia-Ukraine War.” Contemporary Security Policy 44, no. 4 (2023): 592–605. https://doi.org/10.1080/13523260.2023.2257964.
- Swed, Ori, Jae Kwan, Bryan Feldscher, and Thomas Crosbie. “The corporate war dead: New perspectives on the demographics of American and British Contractors.” Armed Forces & Society 46, no. 1 (2020): 3-24
- Swed, Ori, Sachith, Dassanayaka,and Dimitri Volchenkov. “Keeping it authentic: the social footprint of the trolls’ network.” Social Network Analysis and Mining 14, 38 (2024) https://doi.org/10.1007/s13278-023-01161-1
