= Charles Moskos =

American sociologist (1934–2008)

- Born: Charles Constantine Moskos, Jr. May 4, 1934; Chicago, Illinois
- Died: May 31, 2008 (aged 74); Santa Monica, California
- Education: Princeton University (BA); University of California, Los Angeles (MA, PhD)
- Occupations: Sociologist and professor

Charles Constantine Moskos Jr. (May 20, 1934 – May 31, 2008) was an American sociologist of the United States military and a professor at Northwestern University. Described as the nation's "most influential military sociologist" by The Wall Street Journal, Moskos was often a source for reporters from The New York Times, The Washington Post, Los Angeles Times, Chicago Tribune, USA Today, and other periodicals. He was the author of the "don't ask, don't tell" (DADT) policy, the compromise which allowed homosexual service members to serve, but prohibited them from acknowledging their sexual orientation from 1994 to 2011.

== Biography ==
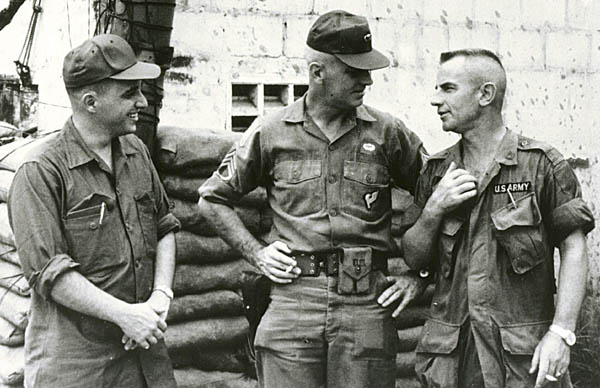
Charles Moskos (left) with Army Staff Sgt. Donald Pratt (center) and an unidentified soldier during a 1967 trip to Vietnam

Moskos was born May 20, 1934, in Chicago, Illinois, to ethnic Greek parents who migrated to the U.S. from the Greek-inhabited village of Çatistë, Ottoman Empire (modern-day Albania). In his book Greek Americans: Struggle and Success, which he jokingly called "his bestseller" bought only by Greek Americans, he recalled that his father, christened Photios, adopted the name Charles after pulling it out of a hat full of "slips with appropriately American-sounding first names."

He attended Princeton University, where he graduated cum laude in 1956, on tuition scholarship and waited tables to pay for room and board. He was drafted into the U.S. Army right after graduation in 1956. Moskos served with the Army's combat engineers in Germany where he wrote his first article, "Has the Army Killed Jim Crow?" for the Negro History Bulletin. After leaving the military, he enrolled at UCLA, where he earned his master's and doctoral degrees in 1963.

== Career ==
His first teaching job was at the University of Michigan, but he was soon recruited to Northwestern University, where he was one of the most popular sociology professors in the school. "Students rush to his classes to hear enthralling lectures peppered with cheesy jokes and anecdotes," the Daily Northwestern recalled in a May 2008 editorial, written the month before his death. "They may be drawn by his famed don't-ask-don't-tell military policy, but they stick around to experience his grandfather-like interactions that make every student feel personally addressed."

Along with a number of other notable Greek Americans, he was a founding member of the Next Generation Initiative, a leadership program aimed at getting students involved in public affairs.

Moskos took many research trips to war-torn countries. He visited American troops in Vietnam (1965 and 1967); the Dominican Republic (1966); Honduras (1984); Panama (1989); Saudi Arabia (1991); Somalia (1993); Haiti (1994); North Macedonia (1995); Hungary (1996); Bosnia and the Serb Republic (1996 and 1998); Kosovo (2000); Kuwait, Qatar, and Iraq (2003). Non-American military visits include: United Nations Force in Cyprus (1969–70), Italian Army in Albania (1994), Greek Army in Bosnia (1998), British Army in Iraq (2003).

Moskos also advocated restoring the military draft. He insisted that enforcing a shared military experience for Americans of different classes, races and economic backgrounds forged a sense of common purpose. "This shared experience helped instill in those who served, as in the national culture generally, a sense of unity and moral seriousness that we would not see again -- until after September 11, 2001," he wrote in a November 2001 article in Washington Monthly (with Paul Glastris). "It's a shame that it has taken terrorist attacks to awaken us to the reality of our shared national fate."

Charles Moskos was a respected source for the military and the media and his influence in the military went very high. Military commanders such as Gen. James L. Jones, the U.S. Marine Corps commandant, and Gen. Gordon R. Sullivan, former U.S. Army chief of staff, regularly sought his advice. In 2005 Moskos completed a study for the Joint Chiefs of Staff on international military cooperation.

He was author of several books, including The American Enlisted Man, The Military - More Than Just A Job?, Soldiers and Sociologists, The New Conscientious Objection, A Call To Civic Service, and Reporting War When There Is No War. He was also the author of All That We Can Be: Black Leadership And Racial Integration The Army Way, which won the Washington Monthly award for the best political book of 1996. In addition, he published well over one hundred articles in scholarly journals and news publications such as The New York Times, The Washington Post, Chicago Tribune, Atlantic Monthly, and the New Republic. His work has been translated into nineteen languages. He was a leading figure in the field of civil-military relations.

In addition, he was consulted by Presidents Bill Clinton and George H.W. Bush and testified before Congress on issues of military personnel policy several times. In 1992, he was appointed by Bush to serve on the Presidential Commission on the Assignment of Women in the Military. He was decorated by the governments of the United States, France, and the Netherlands for his research and held the Distinguished Service Medal, the U.S. Army's highest decoration for a civilian. Moskos also contributed to the creation of the domestic service organization AmeriCorps in 1993. He served as President (1989–1995) and Chair (1989–1997) of the Inter-University Seminar on Armed Forces and Society.

== Don't ask, don't tell ==
What Moskos called his "real fame" came when he coined the phrase "don't ask, don't tell". In 1993, to help break an impasse between the Clinton administration and military leadership over the status of gays in the military, Moskos devised a compromise policy and coined the phrase "don't ask, don't tell". Originally suggested as "Don't Ask, Don't Tell, Don't Seek, Don't Flaunt" to Senate Armed Forces Committee Chairman Senator Sam Nunn, it was eventually shortened to "don't ask, don't tell". Secretary of Defense Les Aspin approved the policy, and it was recommended to the President. In the following months, Moskos worked with the White House, the Armed Forces, and the Senate Armed Forces Committee to draft the policy, which eventually was adopted. Moskos recognized that it was an imperfect solution, but one that could work if effectively enforced. Underlying his position was Moskos's strong conviction that all Americans should serve their country equally, including politicians' offspring and practitioners of alternative lifestyles.

In 2000, Moskos told academic journal Lingua Franca that he felt the "Don't Ask, Don't Tell" policy would be gone within five to ten years. He criticized the unit cohesion argument, the most frequent rationale for the continued exclusion of gay and lesbian service members from the U.S. military. Instead he argued that since "modesty rights" require that women have separate bathrooms and showers, heterosexuals also had modesty rights: "I should not be forced to shower with a woman. I should not be forced to shower with a gay." Moskos's comments were met with outrage by gay activists and Northwestern University students who argued that his fear of being eyed in the shower was not sufficient justification for denying equal rights to gay men and lesbians.

== Influence on military sociology ==
Charles Moskos was a leading figure in the field of Military Sociology. He was a prolific scholar who had a knack for spotting trends in military organizations. He is particularly known for the Institutional/Occupational Dichotomy (I/O Model) and his contribution to the Postmodern Military model.

Moskos introduced the Institutional/Occupational Dichotomy in the late 1970s. By that time, the United States had completed its transition from the draft to an All-Volunteer Force. Market and market mechanisms were beginning to have a profound influence on military organizations. Moskos showed how the armed forces was losing its institutional characteristics and moving toward an occupational or marketplace oriented model (soldier residence and workplace separation, increased reliance on contractors, and recruitment based on appeals to pay and benefits are examples). He wrote many influential articles and books on the subject. The Institutional/Occupational dichotomy has had a lasting and international influence on the literature on enlistment motivation.

At the end of the Cold War, Moskos, alongside John A. Williams and David R. Segal, identified another trend in military organization, referred to as the Postmodern Military Model (PMMM). The threat environment eased considerably with the disbanding of the Soviet Union. The perceived threat moved from nuclear attack or enemy invasion to threats such as terrorism or ethnic conflict. Moskos and colleagues noted that as this shift occurs, it brings changes to a military's force structure, personnel, and it's relationship to society. As seen in the post-Cold War period, the definition of defense moved from a consistent support of the alliance to new missions such as peacekeeping. Civilian employees and contractors grew in importance. Full integration of women and gays became a norm. Conscientious objection was subsumed under civilian service. The wars in Iraq and Afghanistan changed the threat environment yet again, leading to the emergence of a "hybrid" model beyond the post-modern era. Although many of the characteristics of the postmodern military identified by Moskos remained, many others changed to adapt to the new types of emerging threats.

Moskos' book on the postmodern military model, co-authored with John Allen Williams and David Segal, The Postmodern Military: Armed Forces After the Cold War, remains among his most influential.

== Personal life ==
He met his German wife Ilca, a foreign language teacher, while studying at the University of California, Los Angeles. He retired from full-time teaching in 2003 and moved to Santa Monica, returning to Northwestern each fall to teach an introductory sociology course. His wife taught foreign languages at New Trier High School. They had two sons, Peter, a professor at John Jay College of Criminal Justice and Andrew, co-founder of Boom Chicago in Amsterdam. His brother, Harry Moskos of Knoxville, Tennessee, was editor of the Knoxville News Sentinel.

Moskos was a recipient of the American Hellenic Institute's Hellenic Heritage Achievement Award and was a life-long member of the American Hellenic Educational Progressive Association.

Moskos died on May 31, 2008, at his home in Santa Monica, California. His wife wrote: "Charles C. Moskos, of Santa Monica, Calif, formerly of Evanston, Ill, draftee of U.S. Army, died peacefully in his sleep after a struggle with prostate cancer."

== Selected writings ==
- "From Institutions to Occupation: Trends in Military Organization," Armed Forces & Society, vol. 4 (1977), 41–50
- With Morris Janowitz, "Racial Composition in the All-Volunteer Force," Armed Forces & Society, vol. 1 (1974), 109–123
- "Institutional/Occupational Trends in Armed Forces: An Update," Armed Forces & Society, vol. 12 (1986), 377–382
- With Morris Janowitz, "Five Years of the All-Volunteer Force: 1973–1978" Armed Forces & Society, vol. 5 (1979), 171–218
- "National service in America: an idea whose time is coming," Perspectives on culture and society, vol. 1 (1988), 63–80
- Moskos, Charles C. Greek Americans: Struggle and Success Englewood Cliffs, N.J.: Prentice-Hall, 1980. OCLC 5264709
- Moskos, Charles C. Institution Versus Occupation: Contrasting Models of Military Organization. Washington, D.C.: Wilson Center, International Security Studies Program, 1981. OCLC 14169476
- Moskos, Charles C. Peace Soldiers: The Sociology of a United Nations Military Force. Chicago : University of Chicago Press, 1976. ISBN 0-226-54225-4 OCLC 1527429
- Moskos, Charles C. Public Opinion and the Military Establishment. Beverly Hills, Calif. : Sage Publications, 1971. ISBN 0-8039-0116-X OCLC 154044
- Moskos, Charles C. Soldiers and Sociology. [Alexandria, Va.]: United States Army Research Institute for the Behavioral and Social Sciences, 1988. OCLC 22209585
- Moskos, Charles C. The American Enlisted Man; The Rank and File in Today's Military. New York: Russell Sage Foundation, 1970. OCLC 109458
- Moskos, Charles C. Greek Orthodox Youth Today: A Sociological Perspective. In, 'Greek Orthodox Youth Today', Edited by N.M.Vaporis. Brookline: Holy Cross Orthodox Foundation, 1983. ISBN 0-916586-56-1
- Moskos, Charles C. The Sociology of Army Reserves: An Organizational Assessment. Evanston, IL: Northwestern University, 1990. OCLC 23067904

== Legacy ==
The academic community published a tribute volume of essays in 2009, entitled Advances in Military Sociology: Essays in Honour of Charles C. Moskos.

The Pritzker Military Museum & Library holds his book collection. His papers are held nearby at Northwestern University.

== See also ==
- Don't ask, don't tell
- Sexual orientation and military service
