= Peter Moskos =

American academic

- Born: September 5, 1971 (age 54); Chicago, Illinois, U.S.
- Education: Princeton University (BA); Harvard University (MA, PhD)
- Police career
- Department: Baltimore Police Department
- Service years: 1999–2001
- Rank: Officer

Peter Moskos is an American professor at John Jay College of Criminal Justice in the Department of Law, Police Science, and Criminal Justice Administration and the CUNY Graduate Center in the Department of Sociology. He is a former Baltimore Police Department officer. The son of military and Greek American sociologist Charles Moskos, he specializes in policing, crime, and punishment. Moskos was listed by The Atlantic as one of their "Brave Thinkers of 2011" for his book In Defense of Flogging. In Defense of Flogging proposes giving individuals convicted of a crime a choice between incarceration and corporal punishment.

== Cop in the Hood ==
Moskos wrote the award-winning 2008 book Cop in the Hood, describing his doctoral experiences of participant observation as a police officer in Baltimore's Eastern District from 1999 to 2001. Moskos, a Harvard graduate student raised in a white middle-class liberal household, describes his first-hand experiences with poverty and violent crime in the Baltimore Police Department's Eastern District which encompassed a predominantly African-American ghetto of East Baltimore.

In the book, Moskos argues in favor of reforming the criminal justice system and the legalization of drugs. After calling for drug legalization in a Washington Post op-ed, Moskos was criticized by Gil Kerlikowske, and the president of the International Association of Chiefs of Police, Russell B. Laine.

== In Defense of Flogging ==
Moskos's second book advocated judicial corporal punishment (specifically, flogging) as a voluntary alternative to incarceration. One reviewer for The Economist responded by saying: "Perhaps the most damning evidence of the broken American prison system is that it makes a proposal to reinstate flogging appear almost reasonable. Almost".

== Greek Americans ==
Moskos's third book was the third edition of Greek Americans, originally written by his father, Charles Moskos.

== Back from the Brink ==
Moskos's fourth book was about Crime in New York City and the NYPD, specifically the 1990s crime drop and the NYPD (New York City Police Department)
