= James Burk =

American sociologist (born 1948)

James S. Burk
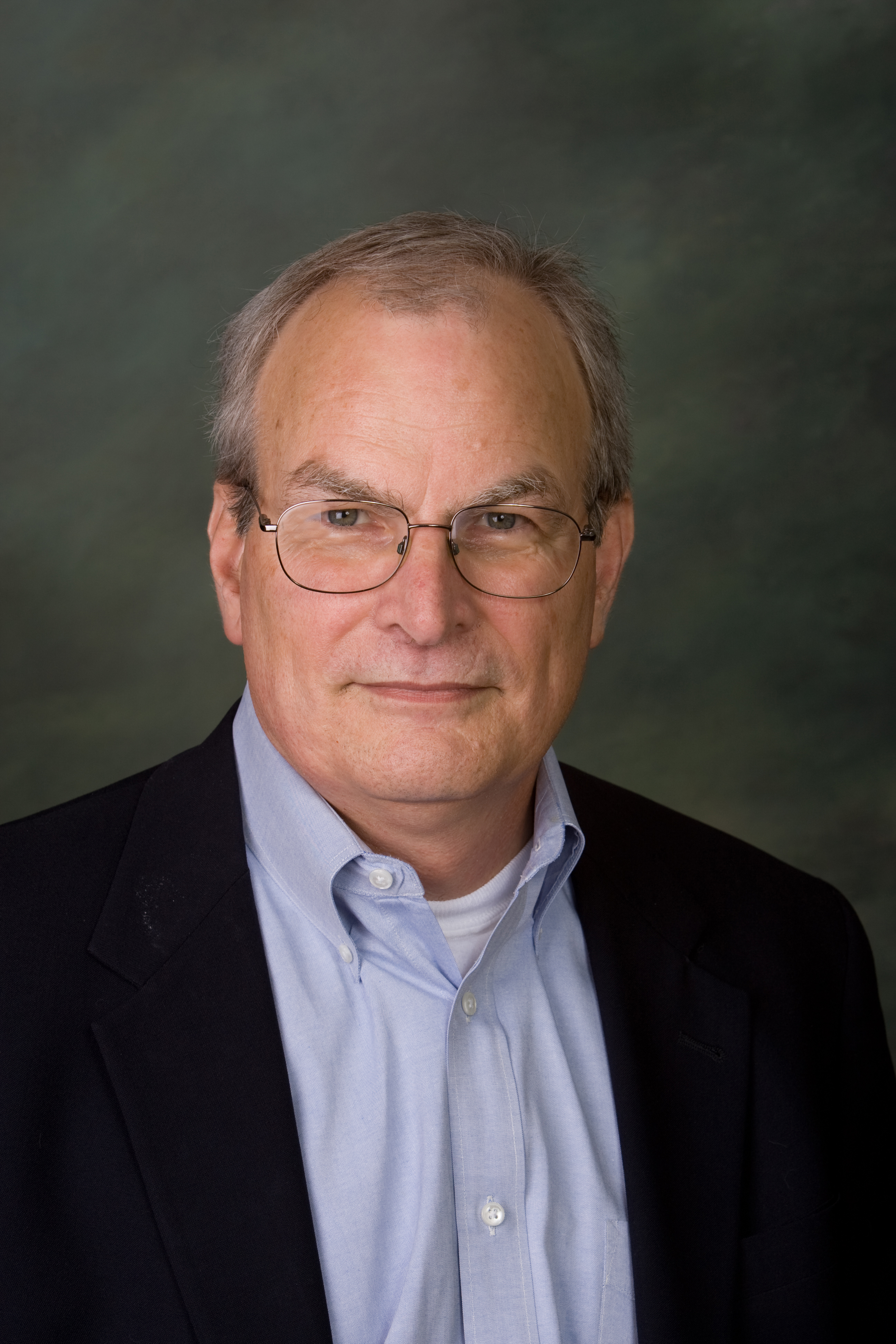
- Born: 1948 (age 76–77); Baltimore, Maryland

Philosophical work
- Main interests: Military sociology, civil-military relations

James S. Burk (born 1948) is an American sociologist and professor at Texas A&M University. He is most notable as a scholar of military sociology, political sociology, and the history of sociology. He is a central figure in the study of civil-military relations in democratic societies.

== Biography ==
Burk was born in Baltimore, Maryland in 1948. He enlisted in the Maryland National Guard and served from 1968 to 1974. In 1975, he received his BS degree in sociology, magna cum laude, from Towson University. He then earned his MA in sociology in 1978 and PhD in sociology in 1982 from the University of Chicago. He cites his primary intellectual influences as Edward Shils and Morris Janowitz, founder of sociological studies of the military. Burk taught for two years at McGill University in Montreal and then joined Texas A&M University in 1983, where he is now a full professor. He received a Distinguished Teaching Award from A&M's College of Liberal Arts in 1990. From 1995 to 1998, he was editor-in-chief of the journal Armed Forces & Society. In 2009, he received the Morris Janowitz Career Achievement Award from the Inter-University Seminar on Armed Forces and Society. One year later, Burk was named a Cornerstone Faculty Fellow in Texas A&M's College of Liberal Arts. He was elected chair and president of the Inter-University Seminar on Armed Forces & Society in 2013. In 2014, he received the Robin M. Williams Jr. Award for Distinguished Contributions to Scholarship, Teaching and Service from the Peace, War, and Social Conflict section of the American Sociological Association.

== Career ==
Throughout his career, Burk has examined issues related to civil-military relations, military sociology, the history of sociology, and the use and regulation of power in relation to democracy. Burk has made distinctive contributions to the history of sociology, especially in relation to the history of military sociology. He collaborated with David R. Segal on a four-volume anthology of primary source materials, documenting key themes in the development of military sociology from the early nineteenth century to the present. Burk has written a comprehensive biographical essay of Janowitz. The essay appears as an introduction to Burk's edited collection of Janowitz's papers published in the Heritage of Sociological Series of the University of Chicago Press.

Over four decades, Burk has studied issues related to the use and abuse of power in democratic societies. His early work on the evolution of American stock market regulation from 1880 to 1980 demonstrates this theme. In the field of military sociology, his work shaped debates in the field, challenging the notion prevalent in the 1990s that the American public would not support military missions if they incurred casualties. Burk also engaged in debates about the integration of race and gender minorities in the all-volunteer force, proposing a new approach for identifying institutional discrimination, which previous analyses omitted. Burk also clarified basic theoretical concepts used to study civil-military relations, such as “military culture,” “constabulary force,” and “civilian control.” He has also introduced new concepts for theory building, relating to the “moral contract” of military service, the military's “institutional presence” in society, and the discretion of soldiers to do “what is wrong.” Finally, Burk's work probes how the changing logics of war affect the military's ability to protect and sustain liberal democracies and liberal democratic values.

== Selected publications ==
- 2013. (edited) How 9-11 Changed Our Ways of War. Stanford: Stanford University Press.
- 2012. (edited with David R. Segal). Military Sociology, four volumes. London: Sage Publications.
- 2012. (with Evelyn Espinoza Sandoval). “Military Race Relations,” Annual Review of Sociology 38: 401–422.
- 2009. “Responsible Obedience and the Discretion to Do What is Wrong.” American Civil-Military Relations: Realities and Challenges in the New Era, ed. Suzanne Nielsen and Don Snider. Baltimore: Johns Hopkins University Press: 149–171.
- 2008. “Military Culture,” Encyclopedia of Violence, Peace, & Conflict, vol. 2, 2nd ed., ed. Lester Kurtz. Oxford: Elsevier: 1242–1256.
- 2005. “Strategic Assumptions and Moral Implications of the Constabulary Force.” Journal of Military Ethics 4 (3): 155–167.
- 2002.“Theories of Democratic Civil-Military Relations.” Armed Forces & Society 29 (Fall): 7-29.
- 2002. “Expertise, Jurisdiction, and Legitimacy of the Military Profession.” The Future of the Army Profession, ed. Don Snider and Gayle Watkins. New York: McGraw-Hill.
- 2001. “The Military’s Presence in American Society, 1950-2000.” Soldiers and Civilians: The Civil-Military Gap in American National Security, ed. Peter D. Feaver, Richard H. Kohn, and Lindsay Cohn. Cambridge, MA: MIT Press: 247–274.
- 1999. “Public Support for Peacekeeping in Lebanon and Somalia: Assessing the Casualties Hypothesis,” Political Science Quarterly 114 (Spring): 53–78.
- 1995. “Military Service and Citizenship Status,” Armed Forces & Society 21 (Summer): 503–529.
- 1993. "Morris Janowitz and the Origins of Sociological Research on Armed Forces and Society." Armed Forces & Society. 19 (Winter): 167–185.
- 1992. Values in the Marketplace: The American Stock Market under Federal Securities Law. New York: Aldine de Gruyter.
- 1991. “Introduction: A Pragmatic Sociology,” Morris Janowitz On Social Organization and Social Control. Chicago: University of Chicago Press: 1-56
