= Morris Janowitz =

American sociologist

- Born: October 22, 1919; Paterson, New Jersey
- Died: November 7, 1988 (aged 69)

Philosophical work
- Main interests: Military sociology, civil–military relations

Morris Janowitz (October 22, 1919 – November 7, 1988) was an American sociologist and professor who made major contributions to sociological theory, the study of prejudice, urban issues, and patriotism. He was one of the founders of military sociology and made major contributions, along with Samuel P. Huntington, to the establishment of contemporary civil-military relations. He was a professor of sociology at the University of Michigan and the University of Chicago and held a five-year chairmanship of the Sociology Department at University of Chicago. He was the Lawrence A. Kimpton Distinguished Service Professor at the University of Chicago. Janowitz was the vice-president of the American Sociological Association, receiving their Career of Distinguished Scholarship award, and a fellow of both the American Academy of Arts and Sciences and the American Philosophical Association. Janowitz also founded the Inter-University Seminar on Armed Forces and Society, as well as the journal Armed Forces & Society. He was an early founder of the field of military sociology. His students, such as David R. Segal, Mady Wechsler Segal, and James Burk are prominent and influential military sociologists.

== Early life and education ==
Janowitz was born and raised in Paterson, New Jersey, the second son of Polish-Jewish immigrants, and attended Eastside High School. Paterson was known for its silk industry, in which his father worked, eventually establishing his own silk business. Janowitz earned a bachelor's degree in economics from Washington Square College of New York University, where he studied under Sidney Hook (former student of John Dewey) and Bruce Lannes Smith (former student of Harold Lasswell). Hook exposed Janowitz to Dewey's philosophy of American pragmatism, while Smith exposed him to Laswell's "Chicago School" approach to social science and psychoanalysis.

== Early career and military service ==
After graduating from Washington Square College, he worked for the Library of Congress and the Justice Department Special War Policies Unit. In 1943, Janowitz was drafted into the Army, where he joined the Office of Strategic Services Research and Analysis Branch, performing content analysis of communications and propaganda in German radio broadcasts, as well as interviews of German prisoners of war. Janowitz's experiences with the war had a profound impact on the subsequent direction of his academic career: "This experience with war, with the research that war required of him and with other social scientists engaged in the war effort, crystallized Janowitz's self-identification as a social scientist".

== Later career ==
In 1946, Janowitz began his graduate studies at the University of Chicago. Janowitz' dissertation at the University of Chicago was supervised by Bruno Bettelheim and Edward Shils. Before completing his Ph.D. in sociology in 1948, he was hired as an instructor at Chicago. He became an assistant professor upon completion of his PhD. In 1951, Janowitz became a sociology professor at the University of Michigan, where he taught until 1961. Toward the end of his stay at Michigan, Janowitz took an academic fellowship, during which he completed his first major publication, The Professional Soldier. During his last year at Michigan, Janowitz organized a group of scholars around the founding of the Inter-University Seminar on Armed Forces and Society (IUS) to "support development of sociological analyses of military organization; to prepare a series of specific research papers on internal military organization; and to serve as a focal point for long-term training in and for the development of a relationship between sociology and the military establishment". The IUS remains active to date, and continues to publish the journal Armed Forces & Society.

In 1962, Janowitz left Michigan and became a professor in the University of Chicago Sociology Department. In 1967, Janowitz was appointed chairman of the department. In this capacity, he worked to rebuild what seemed to be a once great, but presently fractured, Sociology Department. Janowitz did so by encouraging "new theoretical outlooks and alternative methodological approaches" through hiring more diverse faculty members from different disciplines. He also sought to reconstruct the intellectual heritage of the department through the creation of "The Heritage of Sociology" book series. The compilation of 40 volumes in the Heritage series led Janowitz to reflect upon the philosophical foundations for sociology, recalling influential pragmatists such as George Herbert Mead, Sydney Hook, and perhaps most importantly, John Dewey. Janowitz completed his five-year chairmanship of the Sociology Department in 1972. In 1972, Janowitz was honored as a Pitt Professor of American History and Institutions by the University of Cambridge.

Janowitz remained in the department until his retirement in 1987, focusing more heavily on his academic pursuits, which culminated into a trilogy of books published between 1976 and 1983: Social Control of the Welfare State, The Last Half-Century, and The Reconstruction of Patriotism.

== Death ==
Janowitz died one year after retirement in 1988 on November 7 from Parkinson's disease.

== Ideas and accomplishments ==
In 1953 Janowitz summoned a group of scholars, including Samuel P. Huntington, to Ann Arbor, Michigan to discuss the future study of the armed forces. This led Janowitz to cultivate and develop his ideas about military sociology through a Fulbright Fellowship in 1954 and a fellowship at the Center of Advanced Study in the Behavioral Sciences in 1958, where in 1960 he completed his first major publication on military sociology, The Professional Soldier: A Social and Political Portrait (13).

The Professional Soldier was a major accomplishment and established the study of the military as a sub-field in sociology by creating a "fertile research agenda" which other scholars could and still do follow. It remains one of the foundational works in the area of civil-military relations, and was particularly important given that previous foci of sociology had avoided the study of the armed forces. The Professional Soldier focused on military elites, as well as those officers who were "destined soon to join the inner-circles of military decision-making"(177). In The Professional Soldier, Janowitz used a methodology which included content analysis, a survey of 760 generals and admirals and 576 military officers from the Pentagon, and interviews of over 100 high-level officers (995). It revealed the changing nature of organizational authority within the military away from a disciplinary model towards subtler forms of personnel management, reflecting a convergence between the military and civilian spheres. Furthermore, the soldier had become more technical and proficient in its functional means, narrowing the gap between the civilian and military spheres by requiring specialized civilian participation in the more technical capacities of the military. The military also seemed to be experiencing a shift in recruitment trends, wherein the demographics of the military after World War II began to more closely resemble those of the American people. Finally, the leadership of the U.S. Armed Forces had become increasingly politicized. This led Janowitz to develop a dichotomous epistemic framework, consisting of two competing perspectives about the proper use of the armed forces in international relations. These perspectives he termed "absolutist" and "pragmatic" (996). Overall these trends, Janowitz argued, resulted in a convergence between military culture and civil society; in other words, the civilianization of the military and the militarization of civil society. He maintained that nuclear war reduced the likelihood of full-scale war and that the military would gradually take on many of the characteristics of a constabulary force. Subsequently, scholars have used this concept in contemporary peacekeeping.

After Janowitz completed his chairmanship of the sociology department at the University of Chicago in 1972, he was able to place more energy into his academic pursuits. These efforts culminated into the development of a trilogy of books published between 1976 and 1983: Social Control and the Welfare State, The Last Half-Century, and The Reconstruction of Patriotism. Of these three books, The Last Half-Century gained perhaps the most notoriety, though all three works never achieved the success that The Professional Soldier experienced.

=== Perspectives on civil-military relations ===
After the end of World War II, many began to question the role and size of the peace-time U.S. military, arguing against increased militarization of American culture. Morris Janowitz in The Professional Soldier (1960) and Samuel Huntington in The Soldier and The State (1956) formulated two distinct but closely related theories, which provided alternative conceptions to those which emphasized fears of militarization. Both theories concerned the preservation of liberal democracy: Huntington advocated a liberal theory of "objective civilian control" of the military to protect American democracy from foreign threats, while Janowitz advocated a more civic-republican theory, which encouraged active interconnectedness between civil society and the military in order to foster a greater sense of civic participation. These theories were informed by basic historical perspectives about the proper construction of civil-military relations in democratic societies. Huntington's liberal theory of civil-military relations seemed to flow from thinkers like Thomas Hobbes, who advocated that the role of the military was to protect society from threats emerging from the state of nature present in international relations, unbound by the social contract; and John Stuart Mill, who argued strenuously that the military must be regulated and controlled by the state so that it may not pursue its own objectives counter to democratic society. Janowitz's theory of civil-military relations, on the other hand, seemed to recall the ancient Roman republic, which embraced external conflict as a motivating and cohering force for domestic culture, and encouraged civic participation and a sense of "citizenship" necessary for the maintenance of the nation. His theory was also more centrally concerned with civic virtue, inspired through the role of the active participation of the citizen soldier.

As James Burk noted, both theories are somewhat outdated and flawed by today's standards. In Burk's words, Huntington's theory "presumes that there is a clearly delineated military sphere defined by war fighting that is independent of the social and political sphere". Huntington's theory is said to have overlooked the transformation in international relations occurring as a result of development of nuclear weapons, the arms race, and the threat of nuclear annihilation and overestimated the ability of nations to define and achieve acceptable ends under such a war fighting context. The other problem with Huntington's theory is that it advocated for a more conservative realism in international relations, requiring a more "spartan" cultural attitude unacceptable to the American people. On the other hand, Janowitz argued that civic participation should be encouraged in American society through the model of the citizen-soldier, but failed to elucidate how such a model would be propagated in the absence of mass-mobilization for major wars. One such method would have been embedding military service within a voluntary national service system, an idea which never found political support in American politics.

=== Pragmatism ===
Janowitz earned a bachelor's degree in economics from Washington Square College of New York University (New York University), where he studied under Sidney Hook, prominent pragmatist and former student of John Dewey. Hook exposed Janowitz to Dewey's philosophy of American pragmatism at an early age, though he did not fully explore pragmatism's philosophical foundations in sociology until after founding the Heritage of Sociology series at the University of Chicago. Sociology had been weakly tied to pragmatism at the Chicago School through George Herbert Mead and the theory of symbolic interaction, which emphasized a micro-social research agenda.

Janowitz also utilized pragmatism in his characterization of attitudes among military leadership. In The Professional Soldier, Janowitz noted during the Vietnam era a prolonged debate in the officer corp "about the legitimacy of strategic objectives and specific military tactics," which unfolded under two dominant perspectives about the appropriate role of the military in international relations: absolutist and pragmatist. Absolutists were military officers "who thought more in terms of conventional definitions of victory," while pragmatists were those "who thought in terms of changing realities, nuclear weapons and national liberation movements"(xli). Janowitz traced these attitudes historically to competing perspectives about the European and East Asian theaters of war during WWII, noting "a strong continuity between an officer's estimate of the conduct of World War II and his contemporary adherence to pragmatic or absolute doctrine". Those who defined the European theater of war as a "measured success" were more likely to adhere to a pragmatic doctrine, while those who viewed the European theater as a failure tended to be more absolutist. Moreover, the absolutist perspective was associated with an emphasis on and preference for naval strategy (emanating from Alfred Thayer Mahan's theories of naval power) and strategy based on air power, which were both better suited to conflict in East Asia rather than Europe. In the Cold War period, adherents of both perspectives adapted to the new realities of nuclear warfare through a shared belief in nuclear deterrence, but diverged into competing sub-doctrines of "massive and graduated deterrence". Thus, absolutists tended to side with Gen. Macarthur's proposal to commence a strategic nuclear bombing of China during the Korean War in order to achieve absolute military victory, while pragmatists were more likely to support limited wars suitable to achieving political objectives.

== Books ==
- Dynamics of Prejudice: A Psychological and Sociological Study of Veterans, with Bruno Bettleheim (1950)
- The Professional Soldier(1960) Reprinted in 1971. OCLC 685758
- The New Military; Changing Patterns of Organization (1964) OCLC 570037
- The military in the political development of new nations : an essay in comparative analysis (1964) ISBN 9780226393131
- Political Conflict: Essays in Political Sociology (1970) OCLC 96942
- The U.S. forces and the zero draft (1973) ISBN 0900492597
- Military conflict : essays in the institutional analysis of war and peace (1975) ISBN 0803905602
- Social Control of the Welfare State (1976) ISBN 0444990208 OCLC 1858515
- The Last Half-Century: Societal Change and Politics in America (1978) ISBN 0226393062 OCLC 3965991
- Mobility, Subjective Deprivation and Ethnic Hostility (1980) ISBN 0405129750 OCLC 6088117
- The Reconstruction of Patriotism: Education for Civic Consciousness (1983) ISBN 0226393046 OCLC 9762165
- On Social Organization and Social Control (1991) ISBN 0226393011 OCLC 22452568

== Prominent students ==
- David R. Segal
- James B. Jacobs
- James Burk
- Mayer Zald
- Andrew Abbott
- Sam C. Sarkesian

== Published Articles ==
- Shils, Edward A.; Morris Janowitz (1948). Cohesion and Disintegration in the Wehrmacht in World War II. The Public Opinion Quarterly, Vol. 12, No. 2 (Summer, 1948), pp. 280-315 Published by Oxford University Press on behalf of the American Association for Public Opinion Research.
- Janowitz, Morris and Charles C. Moskos Jr."Racial Composition in the All-Volunteer Force." Armed Forces & Society, Oct 1974; vol. 1: pp. 109–123.http://afs.sagepub.com/cgi/reprint/1/1/109
- Janowitz, Morris and Charles C. Moskos Jr."Five Years of the All-Volunteer Force: 1973-1978." Armed Forces & Society, Jan 1979; vol. 5: pp. 171–218.http://afs.sagepub.com/cgi/reprint/5/2/171
- Janowitz, Morris."From Institutional to Occupational: The Need for Conceptual Continuity." Armed Forces & Society, Oct 1977; vol. 4: pp. 51–54.http://afs.sagepub.com/cgi/reprint/4/1/51
- Janowitz, Morris."Military Institutions and Citizenship in Western Societies." Armed Forces & Society, Jan 1976: vol. 2: pp. 185–204.http://afs.sagepub.com/cgi/reprint/2/2/185
