= Inter-University Seminar on Armed Forces and Society =

- Formation: 1960
- Founder: Morris Janowitz
- Headquarters: Loyola University Chicago
- Field: Research
- President and Chair: Laura L. Miller
- Executive Director: Ryan J. Burch
- Secretary: Brenda Moore
- Treasurer: Robert A. Vitas
- Website: http://www.iusafs.org/

The Inter-University Seminar on Armed Forces and Society (IUS) is a professional organization and forum for the exchange and evaluation of research on military institutions, civil-military relations, and military sociology with a broad emphasis across the social and behavioral sciences. The IUS is intended to be interdisciplinary in nature and has around 600 fellows in over 35 countries, who hold varying occupations in the military, academia, and the private sector.

== History ==
The Inter-University Seminar on Armed Forces and Society was founded in 1960 by Morris Janowitz, professor of sociology at the University of Chicago. The IUS is centrally located at Loyola University Chicago and has a Washington D.C. region, a Rocky Mountain region, and a Canada region. The stated mission of the IUS is to provide independent, interdisciplinary analysis of military institutions, which "requires intellectual collaboration across university, organizational, disciplinary, theoretical, and national lines." The IUS publishes the journal Armed Forces & Society, which has been in circulation since 1974. The IUS hosts international conferences every other year, which provide for the presentation and evaluation of new research on civil-military issues.

== President and Chair ==
From left to right: Charles Moskos, Sam Sarkesian, David Segal, Jay Williams

The following persons are or have been President and Chair of the IUS:

- Morris Janowitz, IUS Founding President and Chair (1960–1982)
- Sam C. Sarkesian, IUS President and Chair (1982–1989)
- Charles Moskos, IUS President (1989–1995) and Chair (1989–1997)
- David R. Segal, IUS President (1995–2003) and Chair (1997–2003)
- John Allen "Jay" Williams, IUS President and Chair (2003–2013)
- James Burk, IUS President and Chair (2013–2020)
- Patricia M. Shields, IUS President and Chair (2020–2021)
- Laura L. Miller, IUS President and Chair (2021–Present)

== Scholarly Study of IUS ==
Burk (1993) explored the origins of the study of military sociology with a specific emphasis on the works of Janowitz and a historical review of the first 20 years of the Inter-University Seminar on Armed Forces and Society.
