= Armed Forces & Society =

Academic journal

- Discipline: Sociology, political science
- Language: English
- Edited by: Ori Swed

Publication details
- History: 1974–present
- Publisher: SAGE Publications
- Frequency: Quarterly
- Impact factor: 1.7 (2024)

Standard abbreviations
- ISO 4: Armed Forces Soc.

Indexing
- ISSN: 0095-327X (print); 1556-0848 (web)
- LCCN: 74648333
- OCLC no.: 01796471

Links
- Journal homepage; Online access; Online archive

Armed Forces & Society is a quarterly peer-reviewed academic publication that publishes articles and book reviews on a wide variety of topics including civil–military relations, military sociology, veterans, military psychology, military institutions, conflict management, peacekeeping, conflict resolution, military contracting, terrorism, gender related issues, military families and military ethics. It is the official publication of the Inter-University Seminar on Armed Forces and Society and published by SAGE Publications. The current editor-in-chief is Ori Swed (Texas Tech University).

The journal was established in 1974 by Morris Janowitz (University of Chicago) and became the "first professional journal to focus on the connection between the military and society in an international and interdisciplinary way."

== Abstracting and indexing ==
According to the Journal Citation Reports, the journal has a 2024 impact factor of 1.7.

== Editors-in-chief ==
The following persons are or have been editors-in-chief:

- Morris Janowitz (1973–1983)
- David R. Segal (1983–1989)
- Claude E. Welch Jr. (1989–1992)
- Jay Stanley (1992–1995)
- James Burk (1995–1998)
- Mark Eitelberg (1998–2001)
- Patricia M. Shields (2001–2025)
- Ori Swed (2025–present)

== See also ==
- International Security
- Journal of Peace Research
- Journal of Conflict Resolution
- Military Review
- Naval War College Review
- Parameters
- Security Studies
- The Journal of Military History
- War and Society
