= Civil–military relations =

Study of the relationship between a country's armed forces and civil society/government

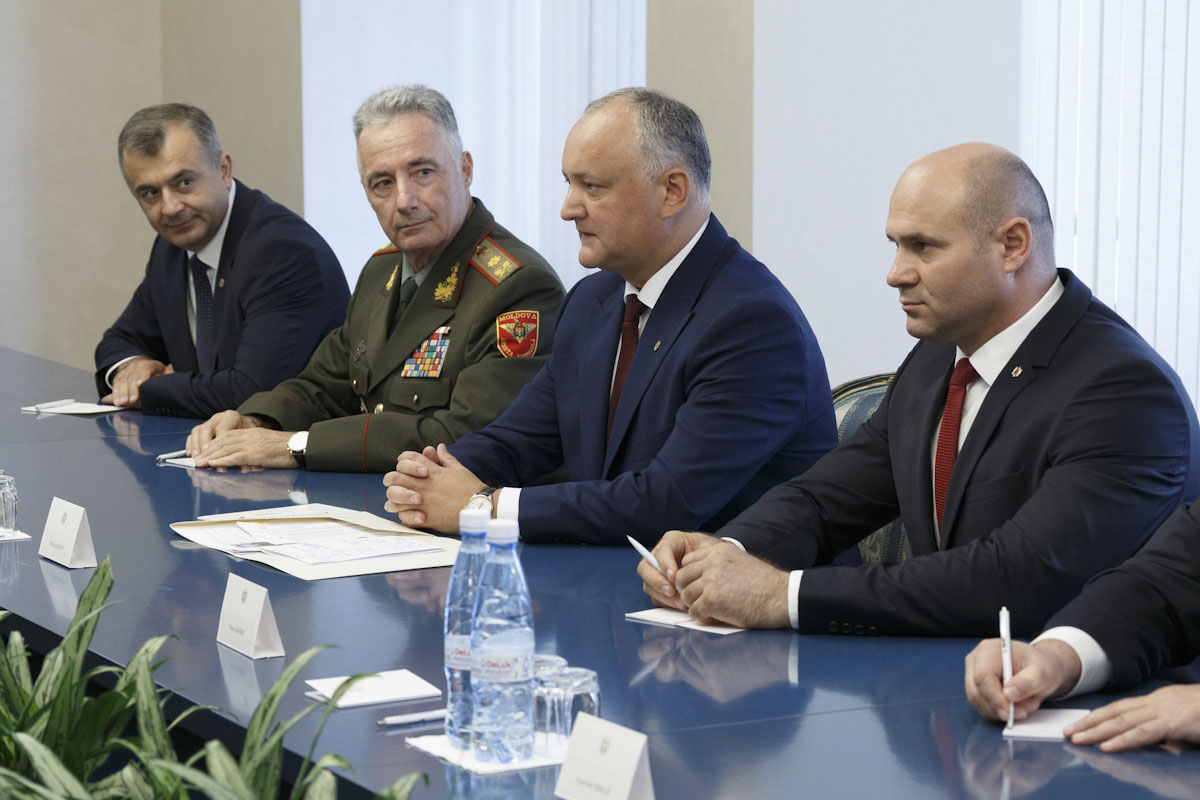
Public meeting of Moldovan President Igor Dodon (center) with the former military defence minister Victor Gaiciuc (center left) and Dodon's defence minister Pavel Voicu (far right), August 2019

Civil–military relations (Civ–Mil or CMR) describes the relationship between military organizations and civil society, military organizations and other government bureaucracies, and leaders and the military. CMR incorporates a diverse, often normative field, which moves within and across management, social science and policy scales. More narrowly, it describes the relationship between the civil authority of a given society and its military authority. "The goal of any state is to harness military professional power to serve vital national security interests, while guarding against the misuse of power that can threaten the well-being of its people." Studies of civil–military relations often rest on a normative assumption that it is preferable to have the ultimate responsibility for a country's strategic decision-making to lie in the hands of the civilian political leadership (i.e. civilian control of the military) rather than a military (a military dictatorship).

A paradox lies at the center of traditional civil–military relations theory. The military, an institution designed to protect the polity, must also be strong enough to threaten the society it serves. A military take-over or coup is an example where this balance is used to change the government. Ultimately, the military must accept that civilian authorities have the "right to be wrong". In other words, they may be responsible for carrying out a policy decision they disagree with. Civilian supremacy over the military is a complicated matter. The rightness or wrongness of a policy or decision can be ambiguous. Civilian decision makers may be impervious to corrective information. The relationship between civilian authorities and military leaders must be worked out in practice.

The principal problem they examine, however, is empirical: to explain how civilian control over the military is established and maintained. In the broader sense it examines the ways society and military intersect or interact and includes topics such as the integration of veterans into society, methods used to recruit and retain service members, and the fairness and efficacy of these systems, the integration of minorities, women, and the LGBT community into the military, the behavior and consequences of private contractors, the role of culture in military organizations, voting behavior of soldiers and veterans, and the gaps in policy preferences between civilians and soldiers.

While generally not considered a separate academic area of study in and of itself, it involves scholars and practitioners from many fields and specialties, although the primary focus is in political science, sociology and history. It involves study and discussion of a diverse range of issues including but not limited to: civilian control of the military, military professionalism, war, civil–military operations, military institutions, and other related subjects. International in scope, civil–military relations involves discussion and research from across the world. The theoretical discussion can include non-state actors as well as more traditional nation-states. Other research involves discerning the details of military political attitudes, voting behavior, and the potential impact on and interaction with democratic society as well as military families.

== History ==
The history of civil–military relations can be traced to the writings of Sun Tzu and Carl von Clausewitz, both of whom argued that military organizations were primarily the servants of the state.

Concerns about a growing militarism in society, largely coming from the experiences of the first half of the twentieth century, engendered an examination into the impact of military organizations within society.

The ramifications of the Cold War, specifically the American decision to maintain a large standing army for the first time in its history, led to concerns about whether such a large military structure could be effectively maintained by a liberal democracy. Samuel P. Huntington and Morris Janowitz published the seminal books on the subject which effectively brought civil–military relations into academia, particularly in political science and sociology.

Despite the peculiarly American impetus for Huntington's and Janowitz's writing, their theoretical arguments have been used in the study of other national civil–military studies. For example, Ayesha Ray used the ideas of Huntington in her book about Indian civil–military relations. In The Man on Horseback, Samuel E. Finer countered some of Huntington's arguments and assumptions and offered a look into the civil–military relationships in the under-developed world. Finer observed that many governments do not have the administrative skills to efficiently govern, thus opening opportunities for military intervention—opportunities that are not as likely in more developed countries.

The increased incidence of military coups d'état since World War II, particularly in the 1960s and 1970s, brought about a growing interest in academic and journalistic circles in studying the nature of such coups. Political upheaval in Africa led to military take-overs in Dahomey, Togo, Congo, and Uganda, to mention just a few. Political unrest in South America, which involved military coups in Bolivia (189 military coups in its first 169 years of existence), Chile, Argentina, Brazil, Paraguay, Peru, and Uruguay, was largely a result of forces attempting to stem the increasing influence of left-wing and communist led uprisings. The 2006 military coup in Thailand and the varied roles of militaries in repressing protests or staging coups in the Arab Spring engendered continued interest in this area.

The end of the Cold War led to new debate about to the proper role of the military in society, both in the United States and in the former Soviet Union. However, as before, much of the discussion revolved around whether the power of the state was in decline and whether an appropriate level of civilian control was being brought to bear on the military.

== Professional organization and journal ==
Inter-University Seminar on Armed Forces and Society

The principal professional organization for civil–military scholars is the Inter-University Seminar on Armed Forces and Society (IUS). The IUS sponsors Armed Forces & Society: An Interdisciplinary Journal, which publishes articles on civil–military relations, force diversity, veterans, military families, privatization, officer training, recruitment and retention, public opinion, conflict management, unit cohesion, ethics, and peacemaking. The journal Armed Forces & Society is located at Texas Tech University and is currently edited by Ori Swed. The IUS and the journal are international in scope and have a conference every other year in odd years. The 2025 conference is held in Reston, Virginia.

The topics of research in civil–military relations are varied as evidenced by recent scholarship in such topics as:

- Health of the force
- Military cohesion
- Civil–military relations in Russia
- Special forces
- Veterans
- Ethics, professionalism and leadership
- Military families
- Women in the military
- LGBTQ issues
- Force effectiveness

== Major theoretical discussions in civil–military relations ==
In 1945, the United States began a demobilization of the massive military force that had been built up during World War II. Strong public and bipartisan pressure succeeded in forcing the government to bring American soldiers home and to reduce the size of the armed forces quickly. Strikes and even some rioting by military personnel at overseas bases in January 1946 pressured President Harry S. Truman to continue the process despite growing concern about the Soviet Union and an increasing recognition that the United States was not going to be able to retreat into the isolationism of the pre-war years. Attempts in the United States Congress to continue conscription to provide a trained reserve as a replacement for a large standing military force failed and, in 1947, the World War II draft law expired.

By the summer of 1950, the armed forces of the United States had fewer than 1.5 million personnel on active duty, down from a high of 12 million in 1945. By the next year, however, in response to North Korea's invasion of South Korea, the size of the U.S. military was again on the rise, doubling to more than 3.2 million personnel. Reaching a high of 3.6 million in 1953, the total number of personnel on active duty in the U.S. military never again dropped below two million during the 40-plus years of the Cold War. After the fall of the Berlin Wall and the collapse of the Soviet Union, the size of the active-duty force had, by 1999, dropped to just under 1.4 million personnel. As of February 28, 2009, a total of 1,398,378 men and women remain on active duty in the U.S. armed forces.

The size of the U.S. military in the latter half of the twentieth century, unprecedented in peacetime, caused concern in some circles, primarily as to the potential effect of maintaining such a large force in a democratic society. Some predicted disaster and were concerned with the growing militarization of American society. These writers were quite sure that a distinctly military culture was inherently dangerous to a non-militaristic liberal society. (Note: Attributed to multiple sources:) Others warned that the ascendancy of the military establishment would fundamentally change American foreign policy and would weaken the intellectual fabric of the country. However, most of the arguments were less apocalyptic and settled along two tracks. The two tracks are highlighted, respectively, by Samuel P. Huntington's Soldier and the State and Morris Janowitz's The Professional Soldier.

The debate focused primarily on the nature of the relationship between the civilian and military worlds. There was widespread agreement that there were two distinct worlds and that they were fundamentally different from one another. The argument was over how best to ensure that the two could coexist without endangering liberal democracy.

=== Institutional theory ===
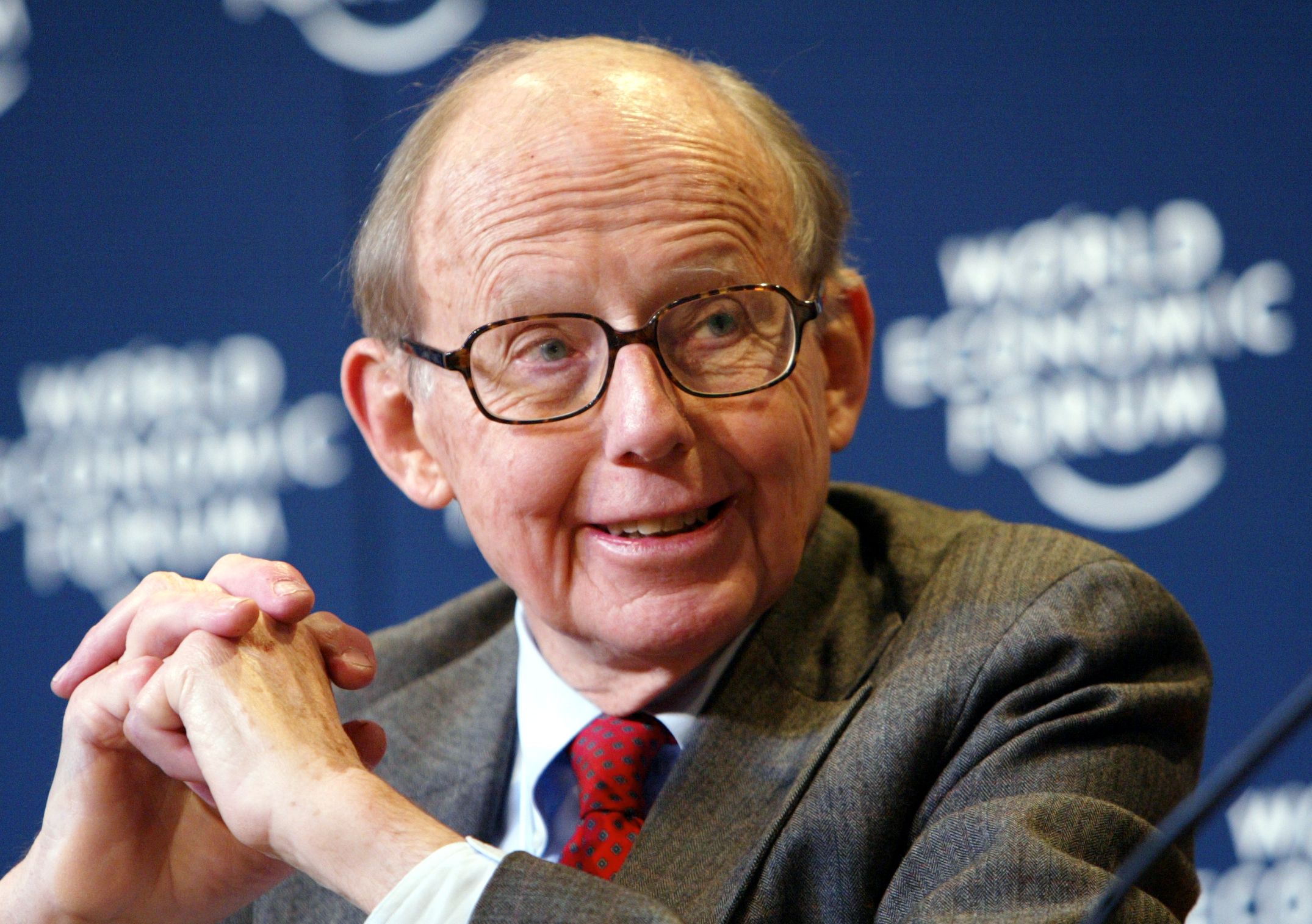
Samuel P. Huntington

In his seminal 1957 book on civil–military relations, The Soldier and the State, Samuel P. Huntington described the differences between the two worlds as a contrast between the attitudes and values held by military personnel, mostly conservative, and those held by civilians, mostly liberal. Each world consisted of a separate institution with its own operative rules and norms. The military's function was furthermore inherently different from that of the civilian world. Given a more conservative military world which was illiberal in many aspects, it was necessary to find a method of ensuring that the liberal civilian world would be able to maintain its dominance over the military world. Huntington's answer to this problem was "military professionalism."

Risa Brooks argues that the health of civil–military relations is best judged by whether there is a (i) preference divergence between military and political leaders, and (ii) whether there is a power imbalance. She argues that the healthiest arrangement of civil–military relations is when the preferences between military and political leaders is low, and political leaders have a dominant power advantage. She argues that the worst kind of civil–military relations is when there is high preference divergence, and military leaders dominate the power balance.

According to Dan Slater, Lucan A. Way, Jean Lachapelle, and Adam E. Casey, variations in military supremacy in authoritarian states can be explained by the nature in which the military was established in the first place: "Where authoritarian mass parties created militaries from scratch, the armed forces have generally remained subservient. Where militaries emerged separately from authoritarian parties, they enjoyed the autonomy necessary to achieve and maintain military supremacy. The core lesson is simple: Unless an autocratic regime created the military, it will struggle to control the military."

=== Convergence theory ===
The other principal thread within the civil–military theoretical debate was that generated in 1960 by Morris Janowitz in The Professional Soldier. Janowitz agreed with Huntington that separate military and civilian worlds existed, but differed from his predecessor regarding the ideal solution for preventing danger to liberal democracy. Since the military world as he saw it was fundamentally conservative, it would resist change and not adapt as rapidly as the more open and unstructured civilian society to changes in the world. Thus, according to Janowitz, the military would benefit from exactly what Huntington argued against – outside intervention.

Janowitz introduced a theory of convergence, arguing that the military, despite the extremely slow pace of change, was in fact changing even without external pressure. Convergence theory postulated either a civilianization of the military or a militarization of society. However, despite this convergence, Janowitz insisted that the military world would retain certain essential differences from the civilian and that it would remain recognizably military in nature.

=== Institutional/occupational hypothesis ===
Charles Moskos developed the institutional/occupational (I/O) hypothesis as a means to promote comparative historical studies of military organization and military change. This hypothesis evolved into the Postmodern Military Model, which helped predict the course of civil–military relations after the end of the Cold War. The I/O hypothesis argued that the military was moving away from an institutional model towards one that was more occupational in nature. An institutional model presents the military as an organization highly divergent from civilian society while an occupational model presents the military more convergent with civilian structures. While Moskos did not propose that the military was ever "entirely separate or entirely coterminous with civilian society", the use of a scale helped better to highlight the changing interface between the armed forces and society.

=== Agency theory ===
The Vietnam War opened deep arguments about civil–military relations that continue to exert powerful influences today. One centered on a contention within military circles that the United States lost the war because of unnecessary civilian meddling in military matters. It was argued that the civilian leadership failed to understand how to use military force and improperly restrained the use of force in achieving victory. Among the first to analyze the war critically was Harry Summers, who used Clausewitz as his theoretical basis. He argued that the principal reason for the loss of the Vietnam War was a failure on the part of the political leadership to understand the goal, which was victory. The Army, always successful on the battlefield, ultimately did not achieve victory because it was misused and misunderstood. Summers argued that the conduct of the war violated many classical principals as described by Clausewitz, thereby contributing to failure. He ended his analysis with a "quintessential strategic lesson learned": that the Army must become "masters of the profession of arms," thus reinforcing an idea along the lines of Huntington's argument for strengthening military professionalism.

H.R. McMaster observed that it was easier for officers in the Gulf War to connect national policy to the actual fighting than was the case during Vietnam. He concluded that the Vietnam War had actually been lost in Washington, D.C., before any fighting occurred, due to a fundamental failure on the part of the civilian and military actors involved to argue the issues adequately. McMaster, who urged a more direct debate between civilians and the military on defense policy and actions, and Summers, who argued for a clear separation between civilians and the military, both pointed out controversies over the proper roles of civilian and military leaders.

Despite those controversies and the apparent lessons learned from the Vietnam War, some theorists recognized a significant problem with Huntington's theory insofar as it appears to question the notion of a separate, apolitical professional military. While there is little argument that separate civilian and military worlds exist, there is significant debate about the proper interaction between the two. As discussed above, Huntington proposed that the ideal arrangement was one whereby civilian political leaders provided objective control to the military leadership and then stepped back to permit the experts in violence to do what was most effective. He further stated that the most dangerous arrangement was one whereby civilian leaders intruded extensively in the military world, creating a situation whereby the military leadership was not politically neutral and security of the nation was thus threatened both by an ineffective military and by provoking the military to avoid taking orders.

Arguably, however, and despite Huntington's urging otherwise, U.S. civilian leadership had been intrusive in its control over the military, not only during the Vietnam War, but also during much of the Cold War. During that time, the military elite had been extensively involved in the politics of defense budgets and management, and yet the United States had managed to emerge successfully from the Cold War. Despite that, none of Huntington's more dire predictions had proven true.

In response to this apparent "puzzle," Peter D. Feaver laid out an agency theory of civil–military relations, which he argued should replace Huntington's institutional theory. Taking a rationalist approach, he used a principal-agent framework, drawn from microeconomics, to explore how actors in a superior position influence those in a subordinate role. He used the concepts of "working" and "shirking" to explain the actions of the subordinate. In his construct, the principal is the civilian leadership that has the responsibility of establishing policy. The agent is the military that will work – carry out the designated task – or shirk – evading the principal's wishes and carrying out actions that further the military's own interests. Shirking at its worst may be disobedience, but Feaver includes such things as "foot-dragging" and leaks to the press.

The problem for the principal is how to ensure that the agent is doing what the principal wants done. Agency theory predicts that if the costs of monitoring the agent are low, the principal will use intrusive methods of control. Intrusive methods include, for the executive branch, such things as inspections, reports, reviews of military plans, and detailed control of the budget, and for Congress, committee oversight hearings and requiring routine reports. For the military agent, if the likelihood that shirking will be detected by the civilian principal is high or if the perceived costs of being punished are too high, the likelihood of shirking is low.

Feaver argued that his theory was different from other theories or models in that it was purely deductive, based on democratic theory rather than on anecdotal evidence, and better enabled analysis of day-to-day decisions and actions on the part of the civilian and military leadership. It operated at the intersection of Huntington's institutional approach and Janowitz's sociological point of view. Huntington concentrated on the relationship between civilian leadership and the military qua institution while Janowitz focused on the relationship of the military qua individuals to American society. Agency theory provided a link between the two enabling an explanation of how civil–military relations work on a day-to-day basis. Specifically, agency theory would predict that the result of a regime of intrusive monitoring by the civilian leadership combined with shirking on the part of the military would result in the highest levels of civil–military conflict. Feaver suggested that post-Cold War developments had so profoundly reduced the perceived costs of monitoring and reduced the perceived expectation of punishment that the gap between what civilians ask the military to do and what the military would prefer to do had increased to unprecedented levels.

=== Concordance theory ===
After observing that most civil–military theory assumes that the civilian and military worlds must necessarily be separate, both physically and ideologically, Rebecca L. Schiff offered a new theory—Concordance—as an alternative. One of the key questions in Civil–Military Relations (CMR) theory has always been to determine under what conditions the military will intervene in the domestic politics of the nation. Most scholars agree with the theory of objective civilian control of the military (Huntington), which focuses on the separation of civil and military institutions. Such a view concentrates and relies heavily on the U.S. case, from an institutional perspective, and especially during the Cold War period. Schiff provides an alternative theory, from both institutional and cultural perspectives, that explains the U.S. case as well as several non-U.S. civil–military relations case studies.

While concordance theory does not preclude a separation between the civilian and military worlds, it does not require such a state to exist. She argues that three societal institutions—(1) the military, (2) political elites, and (3) the citizenry must aim for a cooperative arrangement and some agreement on four primary indicators:

1. Social composition of the officer corps.
2. The political decision-making process.
3. The method of recruiting military personnel.
4. The style of the military.

If agreement occurs among the three partners with respect to the four indicators, domestic military intervention is less likely to occur. In her book, The Military and Domestic Politics, she applied her theory to six international historical cases studies: U.S., post–Second World War period; American Post-Revolutionary Period (1790–1800); Israel (1980–90); Argentina (1945–55); India post-Independence and 1980s; Pakistan (1958–69).

Concordance theory has been applied to emerging democracies, which have more immediate threat of coups.

== Civil–military relations in Afghanistan ==
Researchers from the Overseas Development Institute wrote that 'the belief that development and reconstruction activities are central to security'...'is a central component of western involvement' and that this has been 'highly contentious among aid agencies, perhaps nowhere more so than Afghanistan.' Their April 2013 paper includes the following three key messages –

- Stabilisation approaches are likely to continue to present challenges to the aid community's ability to act according to humanitarian principles in conflict-affected, fragile and post conflict environments. Experiences in Afghanistan highlight significant tension, if not conflict, between stabilisation and internationally recognised guidelines and principles governing civil–military interaction.
- Civil–military dialogue was markedly more effective when it was rooted in International Humanitarian Law (IHL) and strategic argumentation, as with advocacy focused on reducing harm to civilians.
- Aid agencies need to invest more in capacity and training for engaging in civil–military dialogue and, together with donors, seek to generate more objective evidence on the impact of stabilisation approaches.

== See also ==
=== Articles ===
- Defense industry
- Military–industrial complex
- Intelligence contractor
- War profiteering
- National Defense Industrial Association, which lobbies the United States Congress, advocating for the business interests of the private defense industry.
- Aerospace Industries Association
