= Harriet A. Ketcham =

American artist

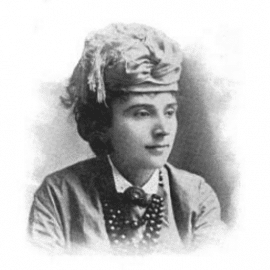
- Born: Harriet Ann McDivit; July 12, 1846; New Market, Ohio
- Died: October 20, 1890 (aged 44); Mount Pleasant, Iowa
- Known for: Sculpture

Harriet A. Ketcham (1846–1890) was an American sculptor known for her work on public monuments.

Ketcham née McDivit was born on July 12, 1846, in New Market, Ohio. She studied for time at Iowa Wesleyan University and then, in 1868, she married William Ketcham with whom she had three children.

Ketcham was a self-taught artist working in local clay and then casting her sculptures in plaster after learning that technique from a Chicago artist. In 1886 she went to Washington, D.C., to studied sculpture with Clark Mills. Mills created many portrait sculptures including the Equestrian statue of George Washington After studying with Mills, Ketcham traveled to Europe where she studied with Franklin Simmons in Rome. In Rome she created a marble sculpture of Peri at the Gates of Paradise which was exhibited at the 1893 World's Columbian Exposition.

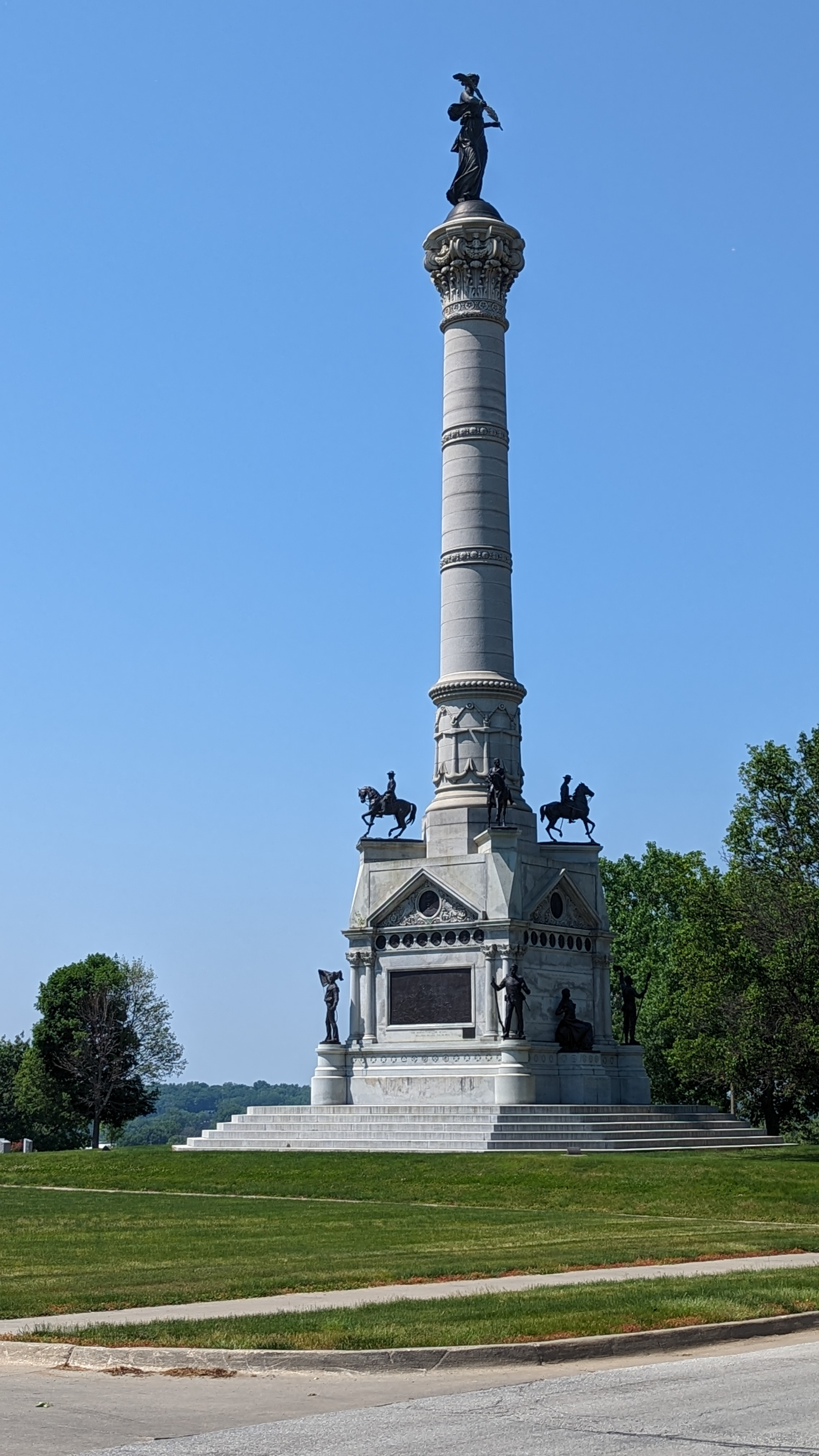
Iowa State Capitol and grounds, July 2023

In 1889 Ketcham entered her monument design for the Iowa Civil War veterans, which was being planned for the grounds of the Iowa State Capitol in Des Moines. Her sketch for the Soldiers’ and Sailors’ Civil War Monument, an equestrian statue, won first place. She subsequently redesigned the monument, as a significantly taller column with a statue of Victory at the top.

Ketcham died on October 13, 1890, in Mount Pleasant, Iowa. Her design was "interpreted" by the sculptor Carl Rohl-Smith. Because Ketcham died before construction began and her final design drawings are lost, it is not possible to determine which elements are Ketcham's ideas and which are Rohl-Smith's.
