= Sherman Monument =

Sherman Monument may refer to:

- William Tecumseh Sherman (Saint-Gaudens), Grand Army Plaza, Manhattan, New York
- General William Tecumseh Sherman Monument, President's Park, Washington, D.C.
