= The Fort Dearborn Massacre Monument =

Sculpture by Carl Rohl-Smith

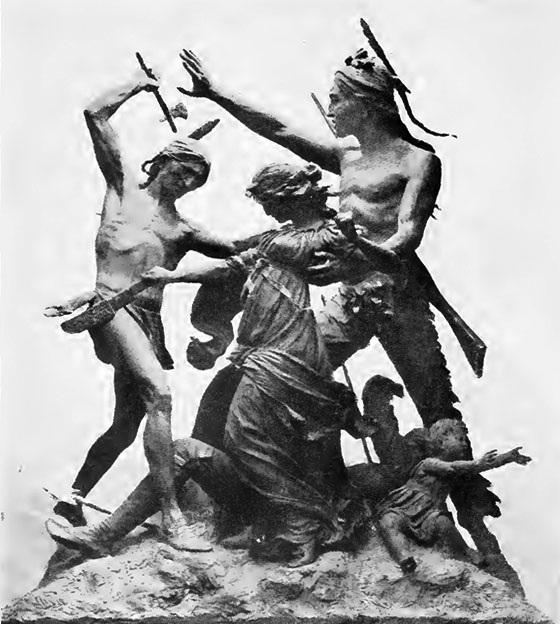
- Artist: Carl Rohl-Smith
- Medium: Bronze sculpture
- Location: Chicago, Illinois, U.S.

The Fort Dearborn Massacre Monument, also known as Potawatomi Rescue and Black Partridge Saving Mrs. Helm, is an 1893 bronze sculpture by Carl Rohl-Smith (1848–1900) that was installed in Chicago, in the U.S. state of Illinois. The statue is about nine feet (three meters) in height. It depicts Black Partridge, a Potawatomi chief, saving the life of Margaret Helm, the wife of a U.S. army officer, during the Battle of Fort Dearborn in 1812.

The Fort Dearborn Massacre Monument is not to be confused with Defense, a 1928 bas relief sculpture by Henry Hering. Defense also depicts a scene from the Battle of Fort Dearborn, and is located on the side of the southwest bridgehouse of the DuSable Bridge, at the corner of Michigan Avenue and Wacker Drive, the former location of Fort Dearborn.

== History ==
The monument was commissioned by George Pullman. It was originally placed near the intersection of Prairie Avenue and 18th Street, which was thought to be the site of the Battle of Fort Dearborn. In 1931 it was moved to the lobby of the Chicago Historical Society. In the 1980s or 1990s it was moved back to near its original location. Some time after that, the monument was removed and placed in a warehouse.

== See also ==
- 1893 in art
