= General William Tecumseh Sherman Monument =

Equestrian statue in Washington, D.C.

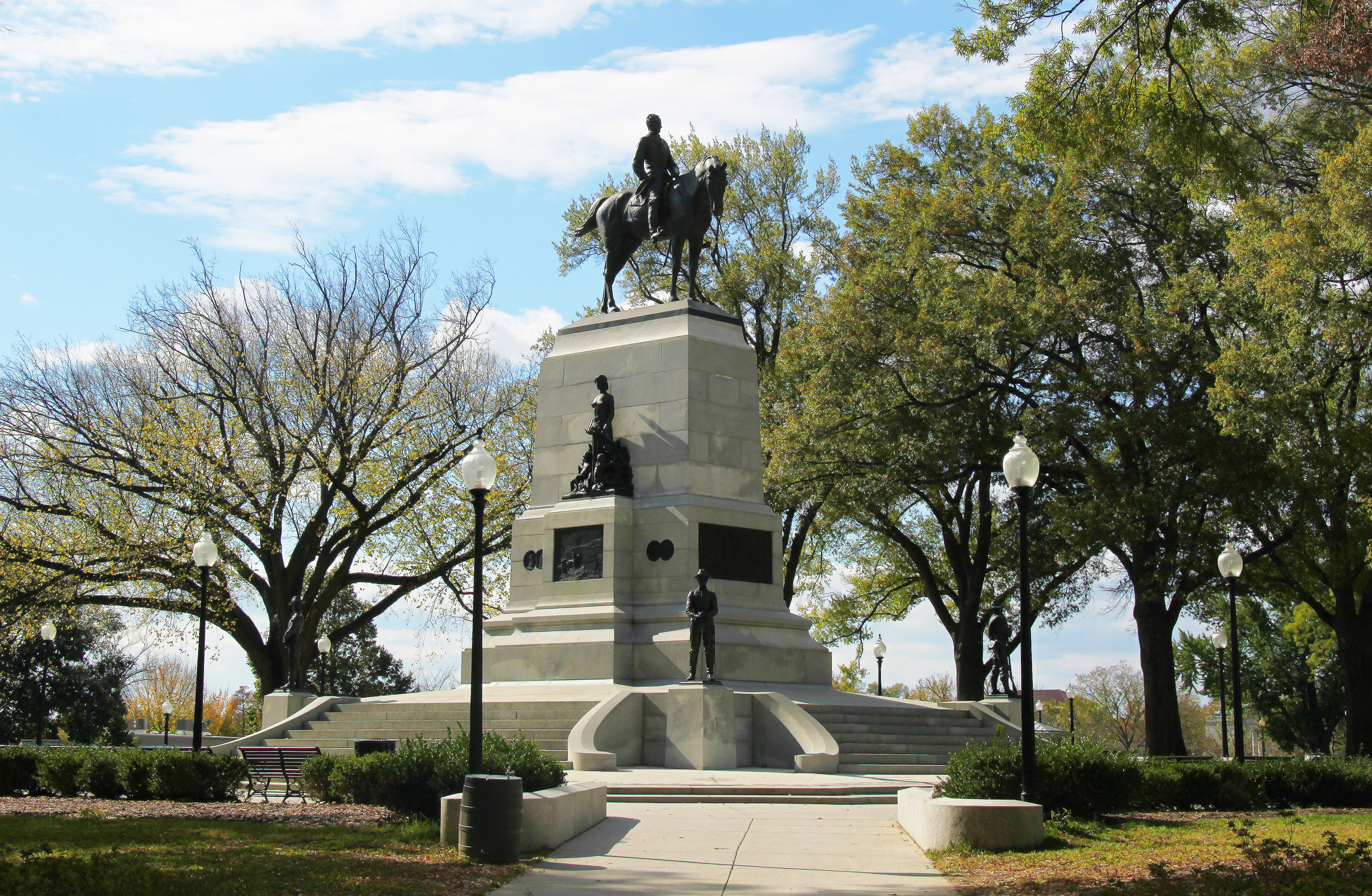
- Monument in 2012
- Artist: Carl Rohl-Smith, others
- Year: 1903
- Type: Bronze and granite
- Location: Washington, D.C.
- Owner: National Park Service
- General William Tecumseh Sherman Monument
- U.S. National Register of Historic Places
- U.S. Historic district – Contributing property
- Location within Washington, D.C.
- Location: Washington, D.C.
- Coordinates: 38°53′45.6″N 77°02′03.5″W
- Part of: Civil War Monuments in Washington, DC
- NRHP reference No.: 78000257
- Added to NRHP: September 20, 1978

The General William Tecumseh Sherman Monument is an equestrian statue of American Civil War Major General William Tecumseh Sherman located in Sherman Plaza, which is part of President's Park in Washington, D.C., in the United States. The selection of an artist in 1896 to design the monument was highly controversial. During the monument's design phase, artist Carl Rohl-Smith died, and his memorial was finished by a number of other sculptors. The Sherman statue was unveiled in 1903. It is a contributing property to the Civil War Monuments in Washington, D.C. (added in 1978) and to the President's Park South (added in 1980), both of which are historic sites listed on the National Register of Historic Places.

== Genesis of the monument, and design controversy ==
Sherman died on February 14, 1891. Within days, the Society of the Army of the Tennessee, a veterans' group for those who served in the Army of the Tennessee, began planning for a memorial to their late commander. At the society's annual meeting in October 1891, the members of the society resolved to ask Congress to contribute $50,000 to a memorial and to establish a Sherman Memorial Commission. On July 5, 1892, Congress enacted legislation establishing the Sherman Monument Commission. The three commission members were the president of the Society of the Army of the Tennessee, the Secretary of War, and the Commander of the United States Army. The Society of the Army of the Tennessee agreed to raise $50,000 (half the cost of the monument). The society contacted its own members as well as those of other veterans groups such as the Grand Army of the Republic, Society of the Army of the Potomac, Society of the Army of the Ohio, Society of the Army of the Cumberland, and the Military Order of the Loyal Legion of the United States. However, the fund-raising appeal netted just $14,469.91. Congress was forced to double its contribution in order to make up the difference.

In 1895, the Sherman Memorial Commission issued a call for proposals. It specified an equestrian statue, and limited the competition to American artists (living at home or abroad). A committee of the National Sculpture Society agreed to judge the submissions. When the competition closed on December 31, 1894, 23 sculptors had submitted proposals. These included Paul Wayland Bartlett (plinth with deeply cut bas-relief of Sherman, War, and Study), Henry Jackson Ellicott and William Bruce Gray (an Ionic pedestal), Adrian Jones of New York (equestrian statue), Fernando Miranda (an elliptical Greek Revival temple), L. Mullgardt (a park with four columns), Charles Henry Niehaus (pedestal with exedra), Victor Olsa (pedestal with bas relief panels), William Ordway Partridge (equestrian statue), and J. Massey Rhind (a monumental pyramid). All the proposed memorials were exhibited in Washington, D.C., to large crowds. The submission by Carl Rohl-Smith generated the most popular acclaim. The National Sculpture Society (NSS) judging committee consisted of Daniel Chester French, Augustus Saint-Gaudens, Olin Levi Warner and John Quincy Adams Ward. The committee narrowed the submissions down to a short list of four: Bartlett, Niehaus, Partridge, and Rhind. The submission by Carl Rohl-Smith did not make the short list. It was ranked almost dead last by the NSS committee.

On May 27, the memorial commission of the Society of the Army of the Tennessee overruled the NSS judging committee and chose the Carl Rohl-Smith design. The National Sculpture Society was outraged, and protested the award strongly to the society and the press. Several newspapers also protested the award. The New York Times called the decision "one of the most discreditable events ever in the annals of the public art of the United States". Senator Edward O. Wolcott sponsored legislation to investigate the award process. Although his resolution was not successful, the Senate debate over the award process was rancorous and showed the Senate's deep distrust of "art experts". Rohl-Smith was accused of using political influence to win the commission, an accusation he vehemently denied. After two months of protests, the National Sculpture Society ceased to contest the award.

== Design, construction, and dedication ==
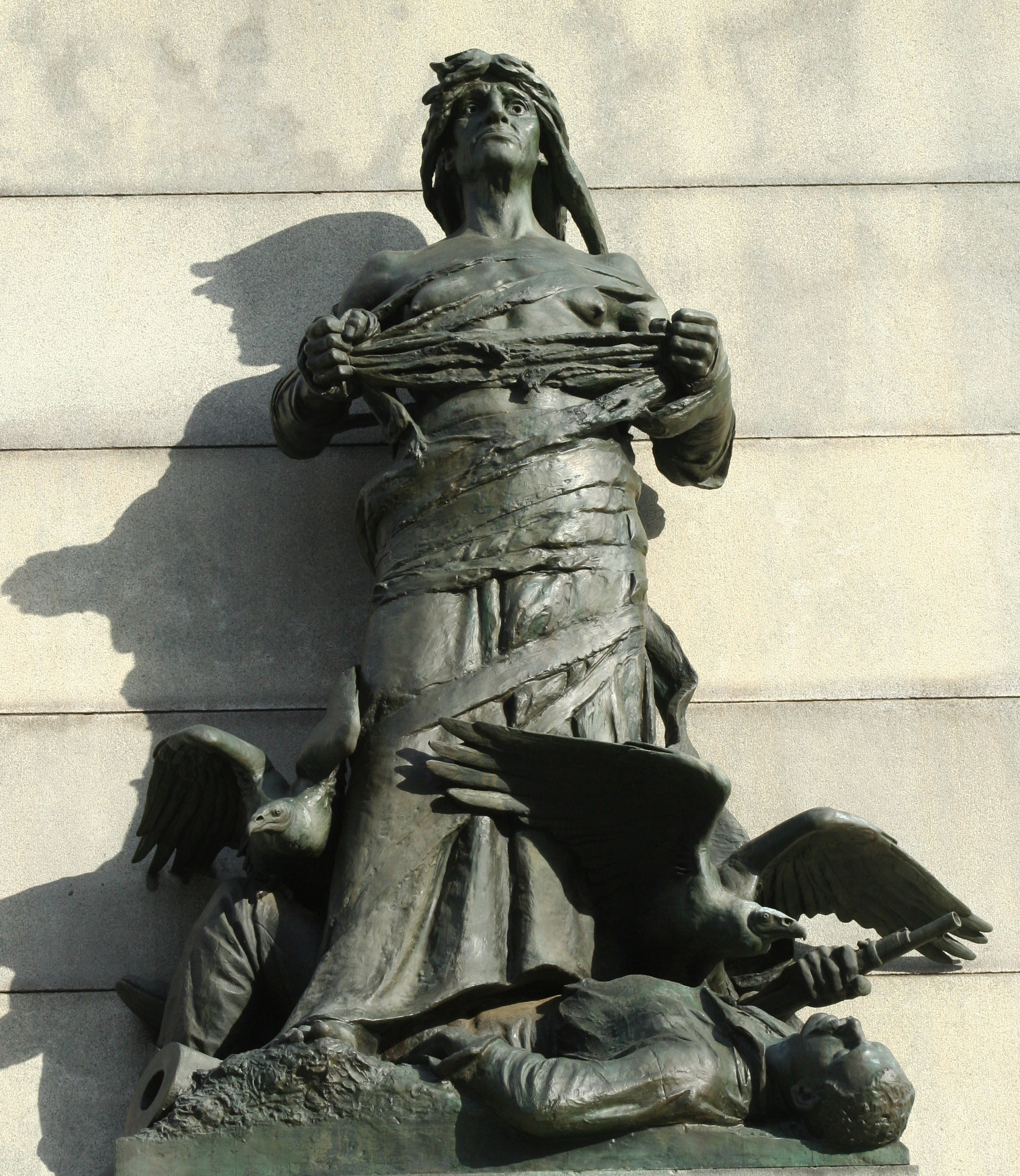
War, a sculptural group on the east side of the monument.

Carl Rohl-Smith never saw his statue completed. He died in August 1900. Although the government determined that the contract with Rohl-Smith was null after his death, the memorial committee agreed to allow Rohl-Smith's assistant and wife, Sara, to oversee the statue's completion. Mrs. Rohl-Smith asked sculptors Theo Kitson, Henry Kirke Bush-Brown, and Jens Ferdinand Willumsen to help with the statue's completion. Later reports do not mention Bush-Brown or Willumsen's work on the monument, but Lauritz Jensen worked on the main statue, while Danish sculptor Stephen Sinding modelled the War and Peace figures. Sinding created plaster models for these pieces from Rohl-Smith's sketches. But upon review, the postures and sizes of the two figures were found not to harmonize with the rest of the monument. Sigvald Asbjornsen remodelled them. As Rohl-Smith had already completed three of the four soldier figures on the corners of the monument, Sigvald Asbjornsen completed the fourth. Sources differ as to whether Asbjornsen completed the artilleryman or the cavalryman. Kitson completed the medallions which depicted the corps commanders who served under Sherman. Jensen completed the four bas relief panels based on work already done by Rohl-Smith, and completed the badge (eagle) of the Army of the Tennessee as well.

Gorham Brothers of Providence, Connecticut, cast the statues and medallions.

The stone pedestal was designed by Rohl-Smith. Erected by April 1902, it was built by the Harrison Granite Company. The granite came from the Fletcher Granite Company of Westford, Massachusetts. The mosaic around the pedestal was designed by Rohl-Smith and constructed by the National Mosaic Company. The monument was expected to cost $90,000, but the final amount was $123,969.91.

The monument was dedicated by President Theodore Roosevelt on October 15, 1903. The monument is located in Sherman Park. This area is where Sherman, along with President Andrew Johnson and General Ulysses Grant, reviewed the Army of the Potomac on May 23, 1865. Sherman led the parade of the Army of the Tennessee past this same site the next day.

On February 18, 1904, Congress legislatively gave the name "Sherman Plaza" to the area where the monument stands.

In 2011, the statue underwent a $2 million restoration.

The statue is a contributing monument to the National Register of Historic Places' Civil War Monuments in Washington, D.C., which was established by Executive Order 11593 on May 13, 1971. The memorial is also a contributing element to President's Park South, an area which was listed on the National Register of Historic Places in 1980.

== About the monument ==
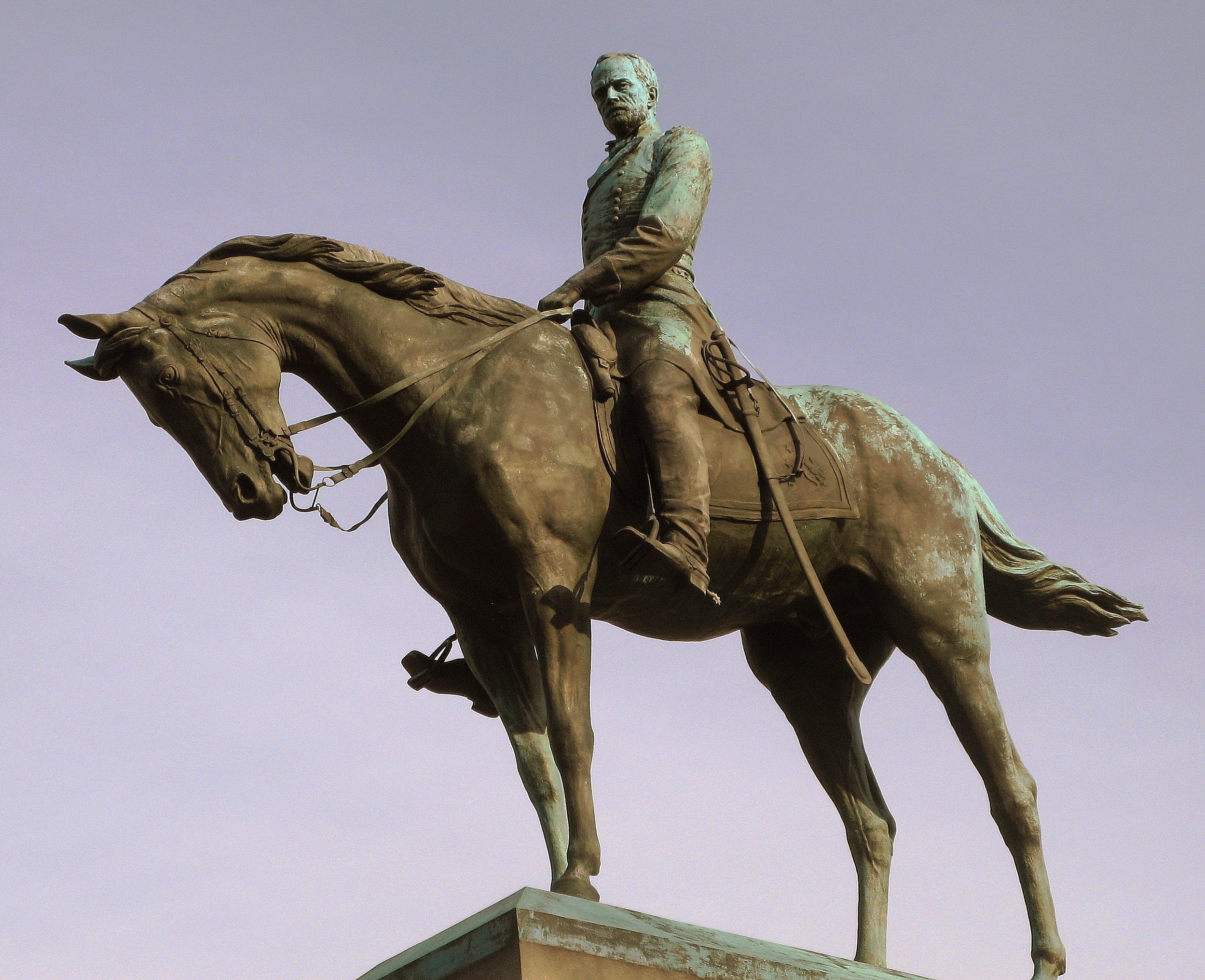
Detail of the equestrian statue

The monument is located in Sherman Plaza, which is at the intersection of 15th Street NW, Pennsylvania Avenue NW, and Treasury Place NW. The equestrian statue of General Sherman is 17 feet 6 inches (5.33 m) tall, and stands atop a granite pedestal 25 feet 4 inches (7.72 m) high. The War and Peace statue groups are each 9 feet 6 inches (2.90 m) high. The four corner statues representing branches of the army are each 7 feet (2.1 m) tall. The March Through Georgia and Battle of Atlanta bas reliefs are each 7 feet 6 inches (2.29 m) by 3 feet 9 inches (1.14 m), while the Sherman By the Campfire and Missionary Ridge bas reliefs are 4 feet (1.2 m) by 3 feet 9 inches (1.14 m) in size. The sculpted badge of the Army of the Tennessee is 5 feet (1.5 m) by 1 foot 6 inches (0.46 m), while the medallion in each pair of medallions is 1 foot 3 inches (0.38 m) square.

From the front step to the back step, the statue is 59 feet 8 inches (18.19 m) long, while the "terrace" above the steps (which surrounds the pedestal) is 41 feet (12 m) long.

The subfoundation of the Sherman Monument was completed in December 1898. About 1,680 cubic yards (1,280 m^{3}) were excavated from the site, while another 284 cubic yards (217 m^{3}) of material were required to backfill and level it. Two hundred and four wooden pilings were driven into the ground to help support the monument, and 1,142 cubic yards (873 m^{3}) of sand and fill and 397.7 cubic yards (304.1 m^{3}) of concrete were used to complete the subfoundation. The pilings had to be sunk 35 feet (11 m) lower than anticipated due to the existence of groundwater at the site. Congress appropriated an extra $10,000 to cover the cost.

Rohl-Smith designed the equestrian statue of Sherman so that it depicted him on the day he rode up Pennsylvania Avenue at the head of the Army of the Tennessee on May 24, 1865.

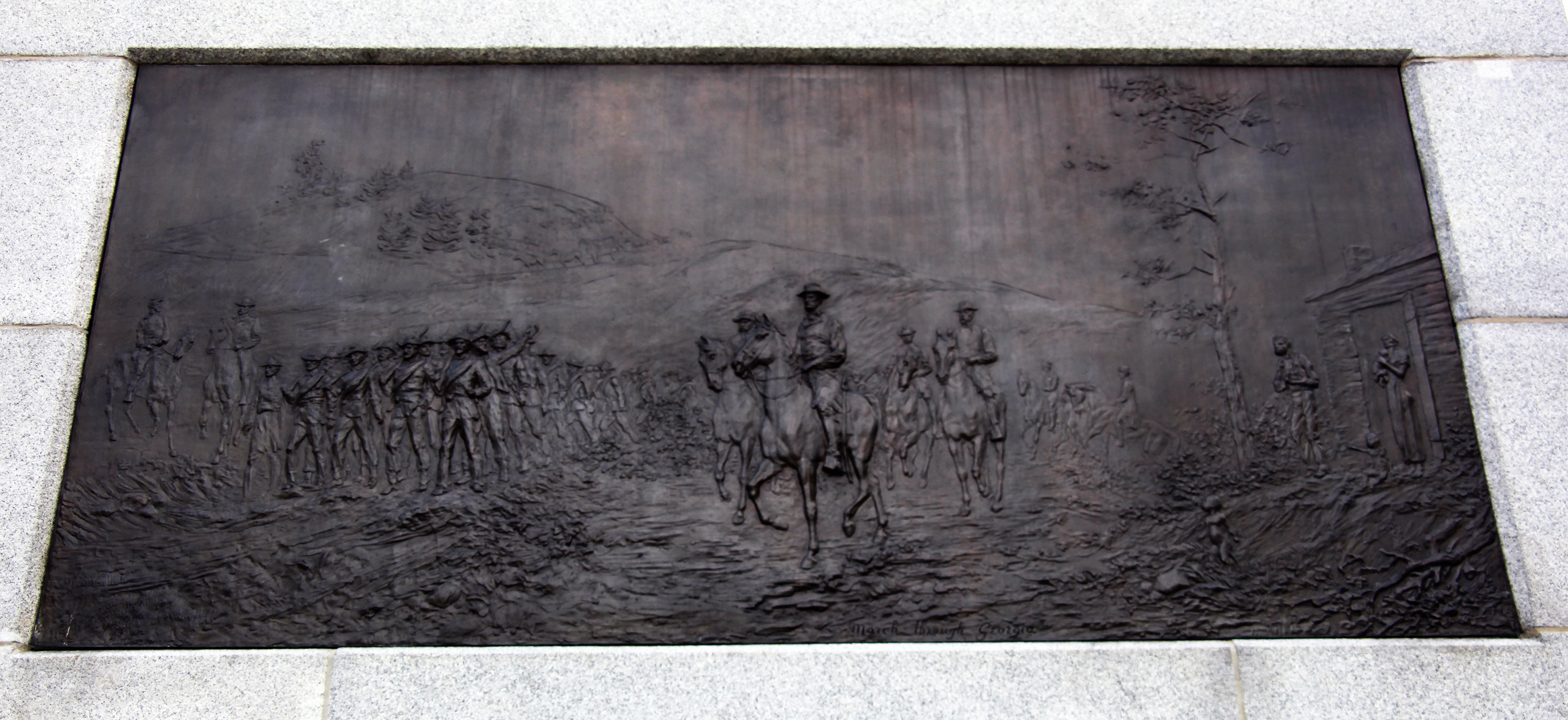
The March Through Georgia, a bas relief panel on the north side of the monument.

Four bas-relief panels adorn the sides of the monument:

- North side: The March Through Georgia depicts men singing as they make their way easily through enemy territory. Sherman can be seen in the background, accompanied by staff members Colonel Lewis M. Dayton, Colonel James C. McCoy, and Captain Joseph C. Audenried. General Peter Joseph Osterhaus is to the left, and many former slaves gape in awe as Sherman's troops pass by.
- South side: The Battle of Atlanta depicts Sherman and his staff listening to cannon fire at Sherman's headquarters at the Augustus Hurt (Howard) House. Among those present and identifiable are General Oliver O. Howard, General John Schofield, and Colonel Orlando Metcalfe Poe (the Chief of Engineers, who is delivering information to Sherman). In the background, the XVIth Corps is shown repulsing the attack which saved the Army of the Tennessee from defeat. In the lower left corner, an escort is arriving. This escort is intended to symbolize the troop which would take the body of General James B. McPherson from the field of battle. The badge of the Army of the Tennessee is below the bas-relief.
- West side: Sherman by the Campfire depicts the recollections of Colonel S. H. M. Byers, who wrote in McClure's Magazine in August 1894 that he often saw Sherman standing or walking by a campfire at night while his men slept.
- East side: Missionary Ridge depicts the Battle of Missionary Ridge on November 25, 1863. Sherman is depicted waiting for news that Major General George Henry Thomas has attacked in the middle of the battle line. Sherman's troops are shown fighting on the ridge in the background.

There are two major figure groups, one on the east and one on the west side of the monument. The western group depicts War (presenting Sherman's epithet that "War is hell!") as an older woman who is tearing asunder her clothing and the straps that bind her. She is trampling on the body of a dead soldier (who lies on his back), while a vulture perches behind her feet and another spreads its wings menacingly over the dead man. The mouth of a cannon can be seen poking from below the dead man's legs. The eastern group depicts Peace as a young woman naked from the waist up, the flowering branch of a fruit tree in her left hand. To her left, a nude young girl tends a wounded young boy dressed in tattered pants (a depiction of the strong caring for the weak). To the woman's right, a nude boy lies in the grass feeding a bird.

There are four figures at each corner of the monument. They represent the artillery (northeast corner), infantry (northwest corner), cavalry (southeast corner), and engineers (southwest corner).

Pairs of medallions depicting the army and corps commanders of the Army of the Tennessee are on each side of the monument. These pairs are: General James B. McPherson and General Oliver O. Howard, General John A. Logan and Major General Frank P. Blair Jr., Brigadier General Grenville M. Dodge and Brigadier General Thomas E. G. Ransom, and Major General Benjamin Grierson and Brigadier General Andrew Jackson Smith.

Rohl-Smith designed the monument to have two low steps, and for a mosaic 6 feet (1.8 m) wide to surround the monument. But Rohl-Smith did not complete the design for the mosaic before his death. His wife, Sara Rohl-Smith, designed the actual mosaic pattern. Congress appropriated another $8,000 to complete it. The mosaic contains the names of the battles Sherman fought in:

- North side: Griswoldville, Waynesboro, Fort McAllister, Capture of Savannah, Averasborough, Bentonville, Durham Station, and the Surrender of Johnston's Army
- East side: Kenesaw Mountain (it is misspelled with one "n" on the monument), Ruff's Mills, Peach Tree Creek, Atlanta, Ezra Church, Utoy Creek, Jonesboro, Capture of Atlanta, and Allatoona.
- South side: Chattanooga, Ringgold, Missionary Ridge, Relief of Knoxville, Meridian Expedition, Dalton, Resaca, New Hope Church, Dallas, and Kulp's Farm (Kolb's Farm is misspelled on the monument).
- West side: Bull Run, Shiloh, Corinth, Chickasaw Bluffs, Arkansas Post, Steele's Bayou, Jackson, Vicksburg, and Colliersville (misspelled, as in most Union reports, with an "s" in the middle).

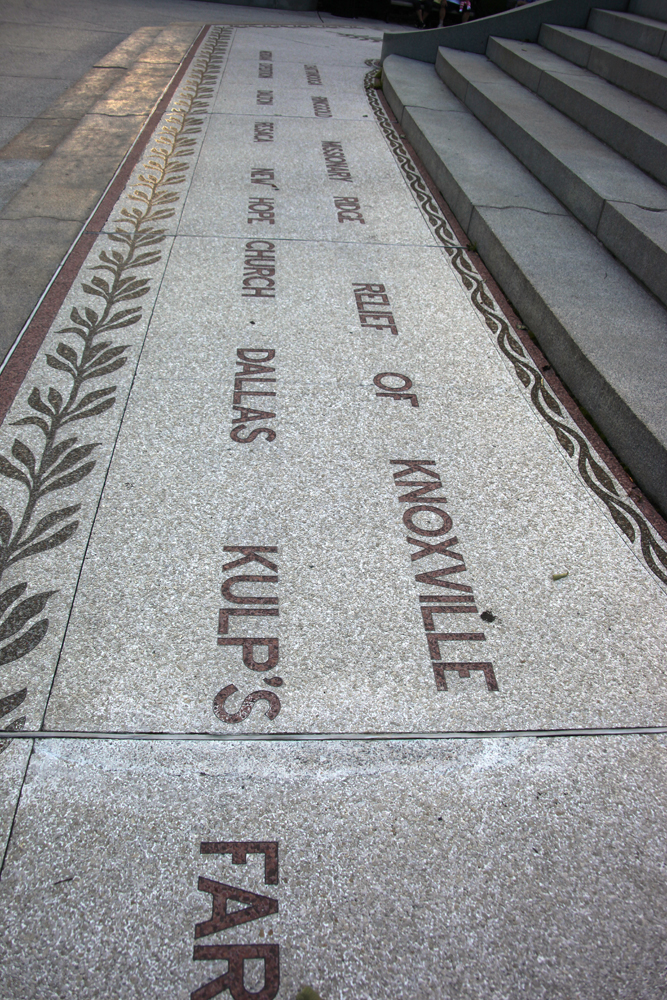
Mosaic on the base of the monument, designed by Sara Rohl-Smith.

The inscription around the monument reads:

(Base, front:)

WILLIAM TECUMSEH SHERMAN
1820–1891

(North side of base:)
ON NO EARTHLY ACCOUNT WILL I DO ANY ACT OR
THINK ANY THOUGHT HOSTILE TO OR IN DEFIANCE
OF THE OLD GOVERNMENT OF THE UNITED STATES
ALEXANDRIA, LOUISIANA JANUARY 18, 1861
WAR'S LEGITIMATE OBJECT IS MORE PERFECT PEACE
WASHINGTON, DC FEBRUARY 23, 1882

(South side of base:)
SEMINOLE WAR 1840–1842
WAR IN MEXICO 1847–1848
OCCUPATION OF CALIFORNIA
CIVIL WAR 1861–1865
GENERAL COMMANDING THE
ARMY OF THE UNITED STATES
1869–1884

(South base, lower side:)
ERECTED BY THE
SOCIETY OF THE ARMY OF THE TENNESSEE
WITH THE AID OF THE
CONGRESS OF THE UNITED STATES

1903

== Access ==
Access to the monument is currently restricted due to the United States Secret Service having expanded the security perimeter around the White House

== See also ==
- List of public art in Washington, D.C., Ward 2

== Bibliography ==
- Bradley, Mark L. (2000). This Astounding Close: The Road to Bennett Place. Chapel Hill, N.C.: University of North Carolina Press. ISBN 9780807857014.
- Dodge, Grenville Mellen (1914). Personal Recollections of President Abraham Lincoln, General Ulysses S. Grant and General William T. Sherman. Council Bluffs, Iowa: The Monarch Printing Company.
- Grant, Ulysses S. (1885). Personal Memoirs of U.S. Grant. New York: C.L. Webster & Co. ISBN 9780404045999.
- Jacob, Kathryn Allamong; Remsberg, Edwin Harlan (1998). Testament to Union: Civil War Monuments in Washington, D.C. Baltimore, Md.: Johns Hopkins University Press. ISBN 9780801858611.
- Keim, De B. Randolph; Rohl-Smith, Carl Vilhelm Daniel; Griffin, Appleton P.C. (1904). Sherman. A Memorial in Art, Oratory, and Literature by the Society of the Army of Tennessee, With the Aid of the Congress of the United States of America. Washington, D.C.: Government Printing Office.
- Slocum, H.W. (1888). "Final Operations of Sherman's Army". In Johnson, Robert Underwood; Buel, Clarence Clough (eds.). Battles and Leaders of the Civil War. Vol. 4. New York: Century Co.
