= Copenhill =

Former neighborhood of Atlanta, Georgia

Coordinates: 33.764831°N 84.356125°W

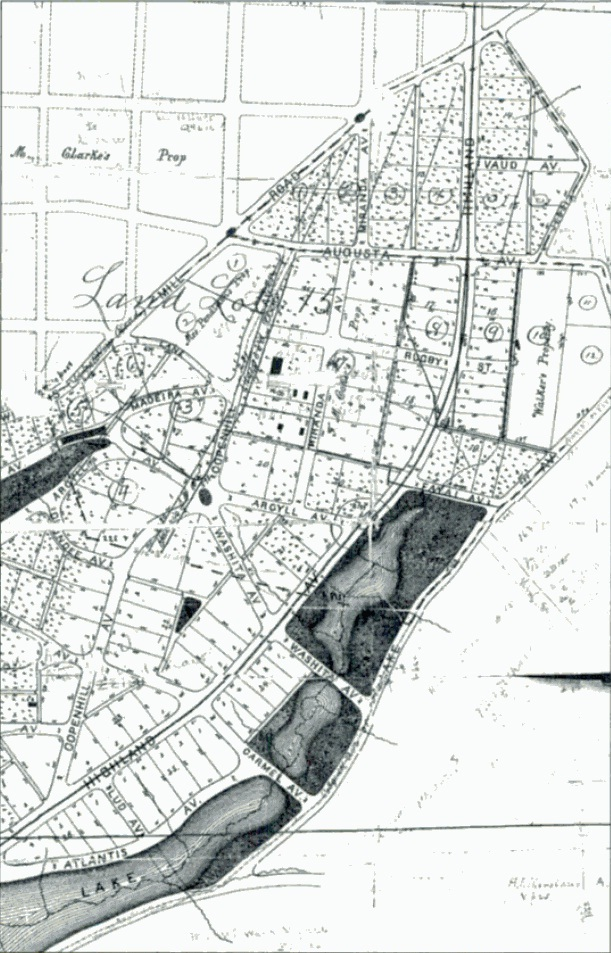
Plan for Copenhill Park, 1887

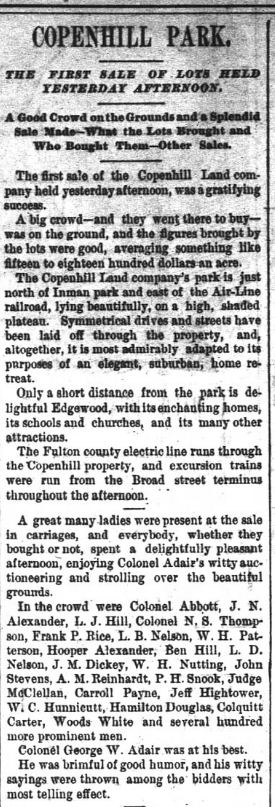
Article about first sale of lots, 1890

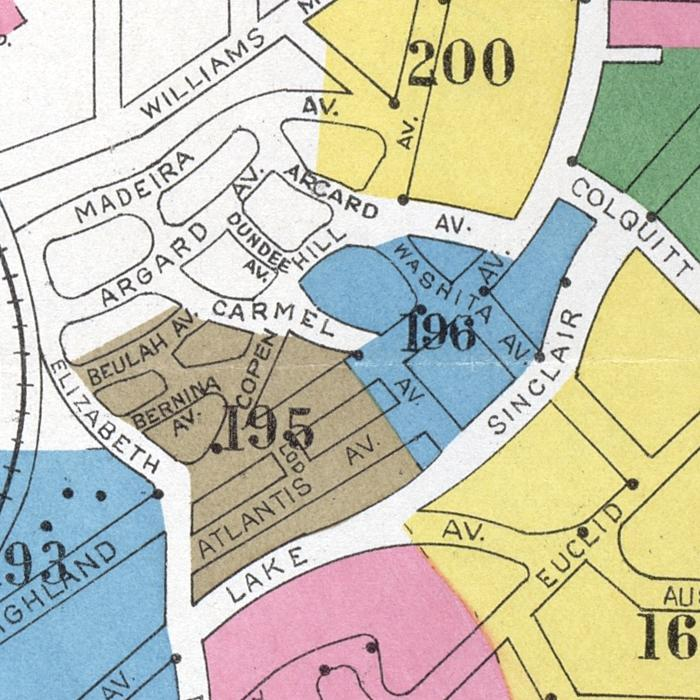
Copenhill 1917

Copenhill, Copenhill Park, or Copen Hill, was a neighborhood of Atlanta, Georgia, United States. It was located largely where the Carter Center sits, which forms part of the Poncey-Highland neighborhood.

== History ==
Copen Hill (as it was originally written) was the site of the Augustus Hurt house (often erroneously cited as "Howard House"), which served as General Sherman's temporary headquarters during the Battle of Atlanta.

In 1888, the Copenhill Land Company was incorporated with Oscar Davis as president and Charles A. Davis as secretary and treasurer; Lodewick Johnson Hill was one of the three owners. The company laid out the city's second "garden suburb" (after Inman Park). The centerpiece was Madeira Park, which, like Springvale Park in Inman Park, was created out of a natural ravine near the center of the development. Intersections of the curving streets were often defined by small circular or triangular parks similar to those found in Ansley Park today. Other open spaces were also included in the original design, most notably the small lake near the intersection of Layal (now Colquitt) Avenue and Highland Avenue, which was fed by a small branch that formed part of the headquarters of Clear Creek. The Copenhill developers cooperated with the Inman Park developers to insure both developments were finished to the greatest advantage of one another.

In April 1890, Col. George W. Adair auctioned off the first lots of the new subdivision of "Copenhill Park", which thus became one of the first streetcar suburbs of Atlanta. The area was attractive, among other reasons, for its accessibility to the Nine-Mile Circle streetcar line along Ponce de Leon Avenue, though streetcar service was later added on Highland Avenue. It lay:

- Northwest of what is now Sinclair Avenue, and included Highland Avenue from Elizabeth to North Avenue. It thus includes houses along Atlantis, Sinclair and one side of a block of Austin that are now considered part of Inman Park
- East of the Southern Railroad (now the BeltLine)
- South of Williams Mill Road, a small portion of which still exists, the rest of which ran roughly along the northern edge of the Carter Center

In 1908 the area was annexed into the city of Atlanta.

=== Post-residential period ===
In June 1929, the area between Barnett Street, Maderia Avenue, and Albion Avenue (near the modern-day Carter Center) was petitioned to be rezoned by the Pattillo Lumber Company. In the 1960s the area was razed to make way for the interchange of the I-485 freeway with the Stone Mountain and Georgia 400 freeways, which, however, were never built in this area. After lying vacant for many years, the Carter Center was finally dedicated in 1986. However, it was only in 1992 that the land originally razed to make way for a freeway was turned instead into a parkway (Freedom Parkway) and park land (Freedom Park).

A memory of the area's former existence as a neighborhood is retained in the name of the café at the Carter Center: the Copenhill Café and Patio.
