= Carl Rohl-Smith =

Danish-American sculptor

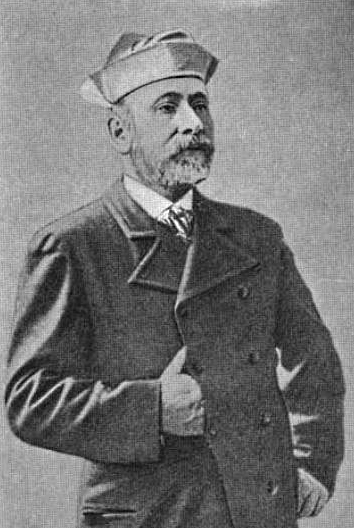
- Carl Rohl-Smith c. 1899
- Born: April 3, 1848; Roskilde, Denmark
- Died: August 20, 1900 (aged 52); Copenhagen, Denmark
- Education: Copenhagen Academy
- Known for: Sculpture
- Notable work: General William Tecumseh Sherman Monument; Iowa Soldiers and Sailors Monument; William Belknap Funerary Monument
- Movement: Realism (visual arts)

Carl Wilhelm Daniel Rohl-Smith (April 3, 1848- August 20, 1900) was a Danish American sculptor who was active in Europe and the United States from 1870 to 1900. He sculpted a number of life-size and small bronzes based on Greco-Roman mythological themes in Europe as well as a wide number of bas-reliefs, busts, funerary monuments, and statues throughout Denmark, the German Confederation, and Italy. Emigrating to the United States in 1886, he once more produced a number of sculptures for private citizens. His most noted American works were a statue of a soldier for a Battle of the Alamo memorial in Texas, a statue of Benjamin Franklin for the World's Columbian Exposition in 1893, a statue group in Chicago commemorating the Fort Dearborn Massacre, and the General William Tecumseh Sherman Monument in Washington, D.C.

== Early life ==
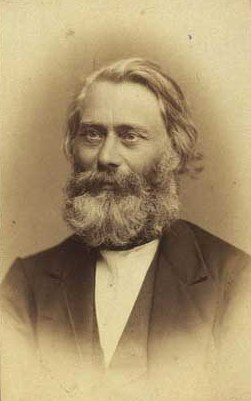
Caspar Smith, Carl Rohl-Smith's linguist father.

Rohl-Smith was born on April 3, 1848, in Roskilde, Denmark, to Caspar Wilhelm Smith and Johanne Marie Frederikke Sophie Röhl Smith. His father was a philologist at the University of Copenhagen. As a child, Rohl-Smith exhibited an artistic nature and was making sculptures out of any materials he could find.

Rohl-Smith studied at the Copenhagen Academy under Herman Wilhelm Bissen beginning in 1865, and graduated in 1869. During his education, he won several prizes for his work. He then studied under Albert Wolff at the Prussian Academy of Arts in Berlin from 1870 to 1872. His 1872 bronze Wounded Philoctetes won a gold medal, and was purchased by the King of Greece. He completed additional studies in Rome, Vienna, and Paris from 1877 to 1881. While in Rome, he executed another major work, Bellerophon, in 1872. It was purchased by the Danish embassy in Rome.

Rohl-Smith became a professor at the Copenhagen Academy in 1885.

Rohl-Smith was already recognized as a prominent sculptor in Denmark and Austria-Hungary. He contributed a number of architectural figures for Frederik's Church (also known as the Marmorkirken, or Marble Church) in Copenhagen, the Austrian Parliament Building in Vienna (the Akroterie, and the Winged Nike over the main entrance), and for numerous parks and public spaces in Denmark, the North German Confederation, and states of the former German Confederation. Perhaps his best known work in Europe was a bronze statue of Ajax, commissioned in 1878 for the second Christiansborg Palace in Copenhagen. It won an Honorable Mention at the art exhibit at the Paris World's Fair of 1878. It was destroyed in the 1884 fire which consumed the palace.

At some point before leaving Denmark for the United States, he married his wife, Sara.

== American career ==
In 1886, Rohl-Smith emigrated to the United States and became an American citizen. Although the sculptor had used the last name Smith in Denmark, he began using the name Rohl-Smith in the U.S. He settled in New York City, and worked at the Hecla Iron Works in Brooklyn and then at the Perth Amboy Terra Cotta Company in Perth Amboy, New Jersey. Between 1886 and 1889, he executed numerous sculptures of famous people in bas-relief and busts. He also designed a number of larger-than-life funerary statues and monuments for famous and wealthy individuals in Boston, Massachusetts; Memphis, Tennessee; and Louisville, Kentucky. One of these included the funerary monument to William W. Belknap in Arlington National Cemetery near Washington, D.C.

Rohl-Smith moved to Louisville, Kentucky, in 1889. He executed a funerary monument to Henry A. Montgomery, a prominent local businessman and politician and founder in 1888 of the New Memphis Jockey Club. (Montgomery had died during the club's opening.) In 1890, Rohl-Smith was asked to implement Harriet A. Ketcham's design for the Iowa Soldiers and Sailors Monument. Ketcham's design was chosen by the state legislature in 1888, but she died of a stroke in 1890. Rohl-Smith was commissioned to finish the work, which was completed in 1896.

Rohl-Smith's most important works prior to 1892 were his Alamo soldier and statue of Judge Reid. The Texas Legislature commissioned James Senille Clark, a well-known manufacturer of stock monuments, to erect a memorial to the Battle of the Alamo on the grounds of the state capitol. Clark, in turn, commissioned Rohl-Smith in 1891 to sculpt the bronze statue of the soldier atop the monument. It is the oldest bronze statue in Texas. Rohl-Smith's other notable American work at this time was a statue of Kentucky Superior Court Judge Richard Reid.

=== Franklin statue and rise to fame ===
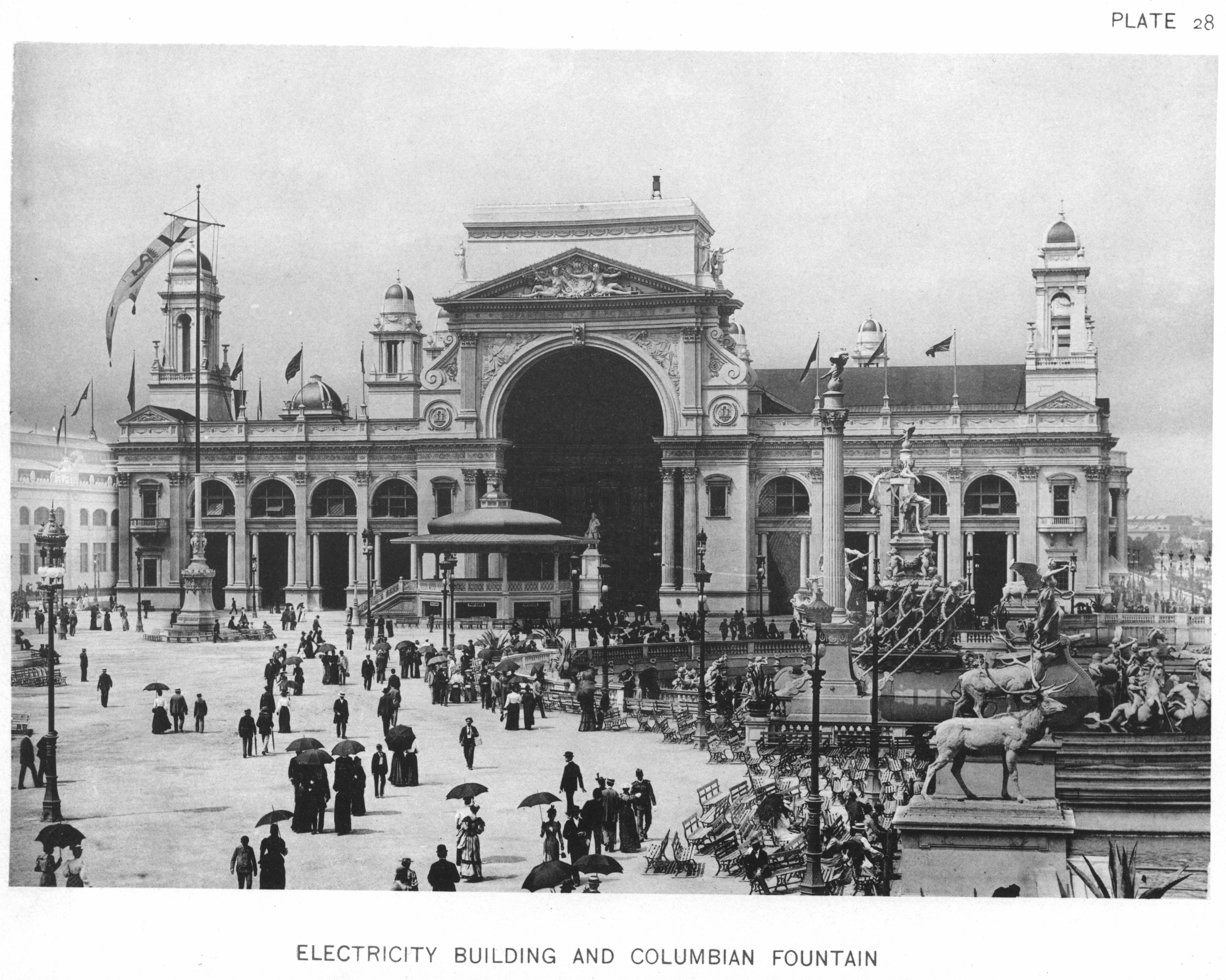
Electricity Building at the 1893 World's Fair, with Rohl-Smith's statue of Benjamin Franklin in front of the apse.

Rohl-Smith moved to Chicago in 1891. His next important American work came in 1892. The commission was for a plaster statue of a young Benjamin Franklin holding a kite for the 1893 World's Columbian Exposition. Rohl-Smith's prestige was such that he was also named Royal Danish Commissioner to the fair. The Franklin statue was widely praised. In 1894, it was gifted to the University of Pennysylvania, where it stood until it decayed in 1895. Around this time, Rohl-Smith became associated with Peter Emil Dreier, a Danish American lawyer and Danish consul in Chicago. Dreier's large circle of friends included many prominent painters and sculptors, and Rohl-Smith's fame began to spread in the artistic community.

The praise for the Franklin statue caught the attention of Chicago industrialist George Pullman, who commissioned Rohl-Smith's next great work. Pullman's Chicago mansion was built on or near the site of the 1812 Fort Dearborn Massacre, in which 28 men, 12 children, and two women were killed by rogue warriors of the Potawatomi Native American tribe. In 1893, Pullman commissioned Rohl-Smith to create a memorial to the Fort Dearborn Massacre (whose 85th anniversary was approaching). After researching the event with his wife, Rohl-Smith decided that the most important and dramatic part of the narrative was the incident in which a rogue warrior is prevented from killing Margaret Helm and her child by the Potawatomi chief Black Partridge. Dr. Isaac Van Voorhees lies dying beneath Helm's feet. Two members of the Lakota nation, Kicking Bear and Short Bull, were imprisoned at nearby Fort Sheridan for having fired at United States Army troops during the Wounded Knee Massacre in 1890. Short Bull posed as the less muscular, younger warrior attempting to kill Helm, while Kicking Bear posed as Black Partridge. Pullman donated the sculpture to the city of Chicago. Pullman was so pleased with the memorial that in 1895 he commissioned Rohl-Smith to sculpt bas-relief portraits of his parents for Pullman Memorial Universalist Church in Albion, New York.

From 1891 to 1897, Rohl-Smith continued to produce an extensive number of bas-reliefs, busts, and statues of famous people.

=== Sherman monument ===
Rohl-Smith received his last, and perhaps greatest, commission in 1895. Renowned American Civil War Major General William Tecumseh Sherman died on February 14, 1891. On July 5, 1892, Congress enacted legislation authorizing a General William Tecumseh Sherman Monument and establishing the Sherman Memorial Commission. In 1895, the Sherman Memorial Commission issued a call for proposals for an equestrian statue of Sherman. A committee of the National Sculpture Society agreed to judge the submissions. When the competition closed on December 31, 1894, 23 sculptors had submitted proposals. Models of all the proposed statues were exhibited in Washington, D.C., to large crowds. The submission by Carl Rohl-Smith generated the most popular acclaim. The National Sculpture Society (NSS) narrowed the submissions down to a short list of four. The submission by Rohl-Smith did not make the short list; indeed, it was ranked almost dead last by the NSS committee. On May 27, the Sherman Memorial Commission overruled the judging committee and chose Rohl-Smith's design. The National Sculpture Society was outraged, and protested the award strongly to the memorial commission and the press. The New York Times called the decision "one of the most discreditable events ever in the annals of the public art of the United States". Senator Edward O. Wolcott sponsored legislation to investigate the award process. Although his resolution was not successful, the Senate debate over the award process was rancorous and showed the Senate's deep distrust of "art experts". Rohl-Smith was accused of using political influence to win the commission, an accusation he vehemently denied. After two months of protests, the National Sculpture Society ceased to contest the award.

After winning the Sherman Monument commission, Rohl-Smith moved to Washington, D.C., in 1897 and set up a studio on the White House grounds next to the memorial's location. A large, barn-like structure was built on Treasury Place NW. With a front door extending 50 feet (15 m) high, verandas on three sides, lean-tos in the rear for mixing of plaster, tall windows, and a tin roof, the structure was intended not only to function as a workshop for the construction of a life-size model of the Sherman monument but also as living quarters for the Rohl-Smiths.

Carl Rohl-Smith never saw his Sherman Monument completed. He died in Copenhagen in August 1900, and was buried in Vestre Cemetery.

Although the government determined that the contract with Rohl-Smith was null after his death, the memorial commission agreed to allow Rohl-Smith's assistant and wife, Sara, to oversee the statue's completion. Mrs. Rohl-Smith asked sculptors Theo Kitson, Bush Brown, and Jens Ferdinand Willumsen to help with the statue's completion. Later reports do not mention Brown or Willumsen's work on the monument, but Lauritz Jensen worked on the main statue, while Danish sculptor Stephen Sinding modelled the War and Peace figures. Sinding created plaster models for these pieces from Rohl-Smith's sketches. But upon review, the postures and sizes of the two figures were found not to harmonize with the rest of the monument. Sigvald Asbjornsen remodelled them. As Rohl-Smith had already completed three of the four soldier figures on the corners of the monument, Sigvald Asbjornsen completed the fourth. Sources differ as to whether Asbjornsen completed the artilleryman or the cavalryman. Kitson completed the medallions which depicted the corps commanders who served under Sherman. Jensen completed the four bas relief panels based on work already completed by Rohl-Smith, as well as completing the badge (eagle) of the Army of the Tennessee. The design for the stone pedestal was complete at the time of Rohl-Smith's death. The monument was dedicated by President Theodore Roosevelt on October 15, 1903.

== Death ==
Rohl-Smith fell ill with malaria and returned to Europe in June 1896, where he stayed until the fall. Although Rohl-Smith returned to the United States, his ongoing ill health (due to another attack of malaria) kept him from working on the Sherman statue through October 1898. Ill health continued to plague him. By March 1900, he had only completed the design for the pedestal (which had been erected) and three of the four corner "sentry" figures. Only sketches had been made for the equestrian statue itself, the side panels, the "War" and "Peace" statue groups, and the medallions.

Rohl-Smith departed Washington for Denmark in July 1900 to escape the city's severe summer heat and humidity. In August 1900, Rohl-Smith became suddenly ill. He died of Bright's disease at St. Josef's Hospital in Copenhagen on August 22, 1900, with his wife at his side.

Sara Rohl-Smith died in Copenhagen in August 1921.

== Notable works ==
- Bellerophon, Danish embassy, Rome, Italy, 1872.
- Akroterie and Winged Nike, Austrian Parliament Building, Vienna, Austria, c. 1874 to 1883.
- Ajax, Christiansborg Palace, Copenhagen, Denmark, 1878 (now lost).
- Apollo and Diana, Pan and Daphne, Summer, Winter (architectural sculpture), Eremitage Palace, Dyrehaven, Denmark, 1881–1886.
- Saint Athanasius, Saint Irenaeus of Lyon, John the Baptist, Moses (architectural sculpture), Marmorkirken (The Marble Church), Copenhagen, Denmark, 1883–1884.
- Bacchante Group, private collection, United States, 1885.
- Young Benjamin Franklin With Kite, World's Columbian Exposition, Chicago, Illinois, United States, 1893 (now lost).
- The Fort Dearborn Massacre Monument, Chicago History Museum, Chicago, Illinois, United States, 1893.
- Bas-relief portraits of Emily Caroline Pullman and James Lewis Pullman, Pullman Memorial Universalist Church, Albion, New York, United States, 1895.
- Equestrian Statue of General John M. Corse, Crapo Park, Burlington, Iowa, 1896.
- William W. Belknap Monument, Arlington National Cemetery, Arlington County, Virginia, United States, 1897.
- General William Tecumseh Sherman Monument, President's Park, Washington D.C., United States (unfinished)

== Gallery ==
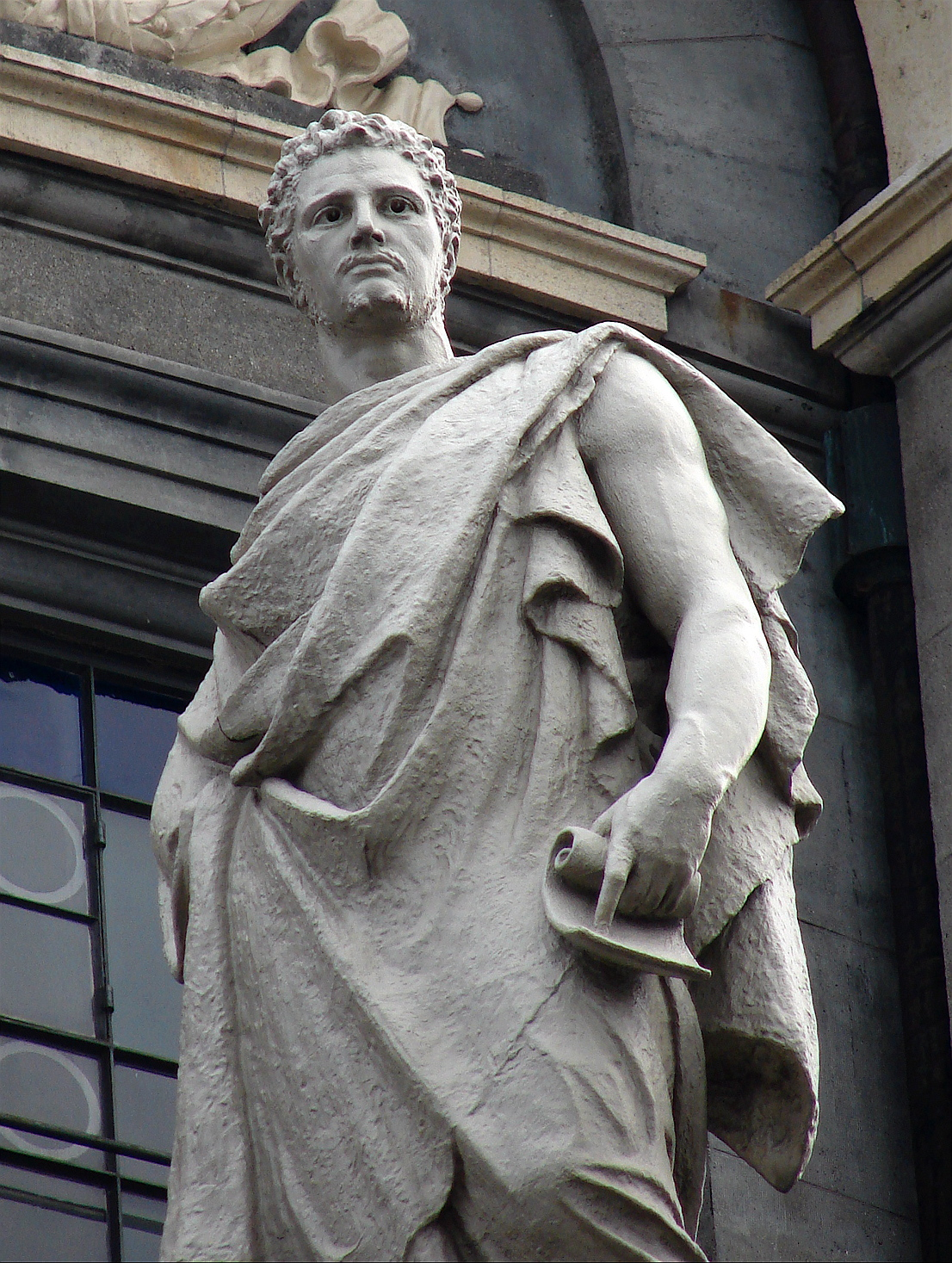
Saint Athanasius (1883–1884), The Marble Church, Copenhagen, Denmark.

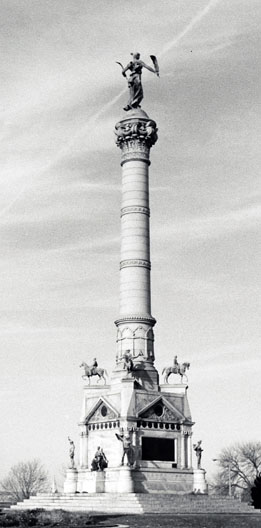
Iowa Soldiers' and Sailors' Monument (1890–94), Des Moines.

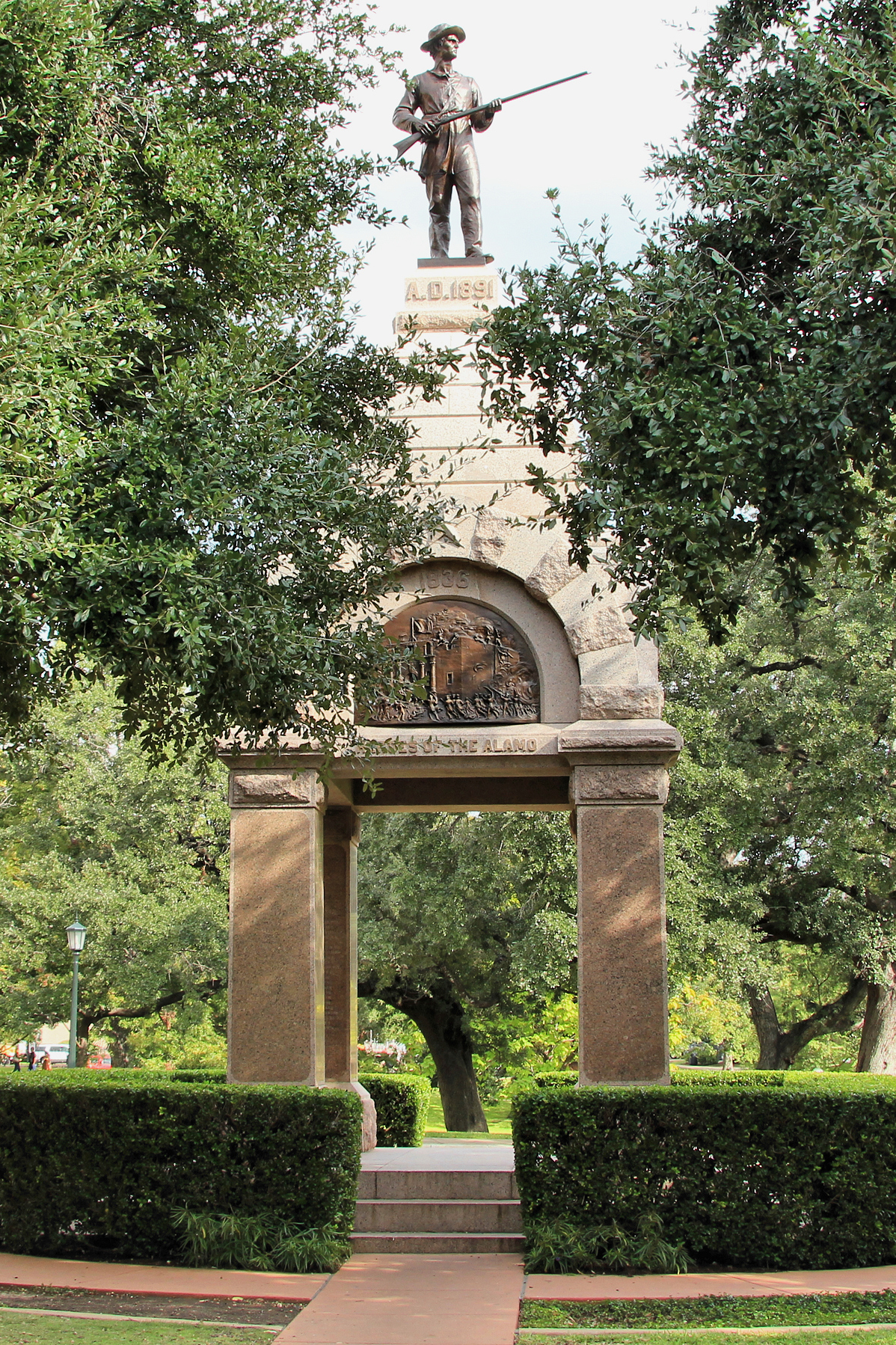
Heroes of the Alamo Monument (1891), Texas State Capitol, Austin.

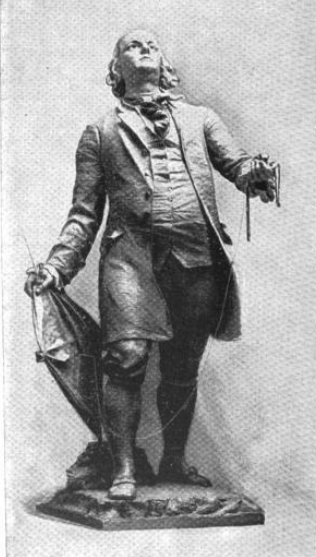
Young Benjamin Franklin with Kite (1893), World's Columbian Exposition, Chicago, Illinois, United States. (believed destroyed)

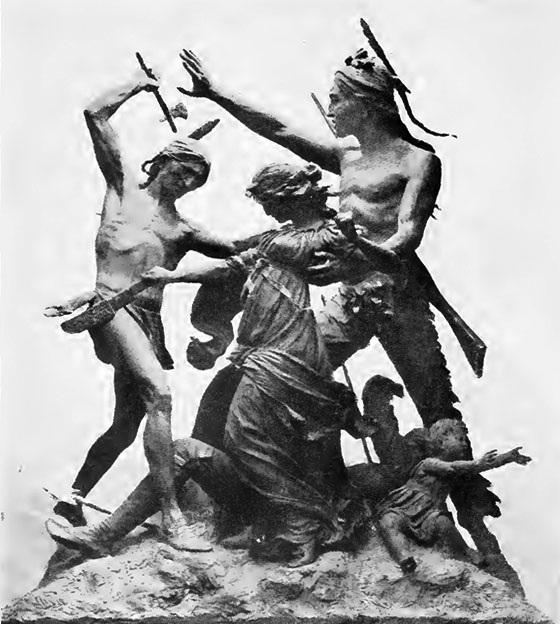
Fort Dearborn Massacre Monument (1893), Chicago History Museum, Chicago, Illinois, United States.

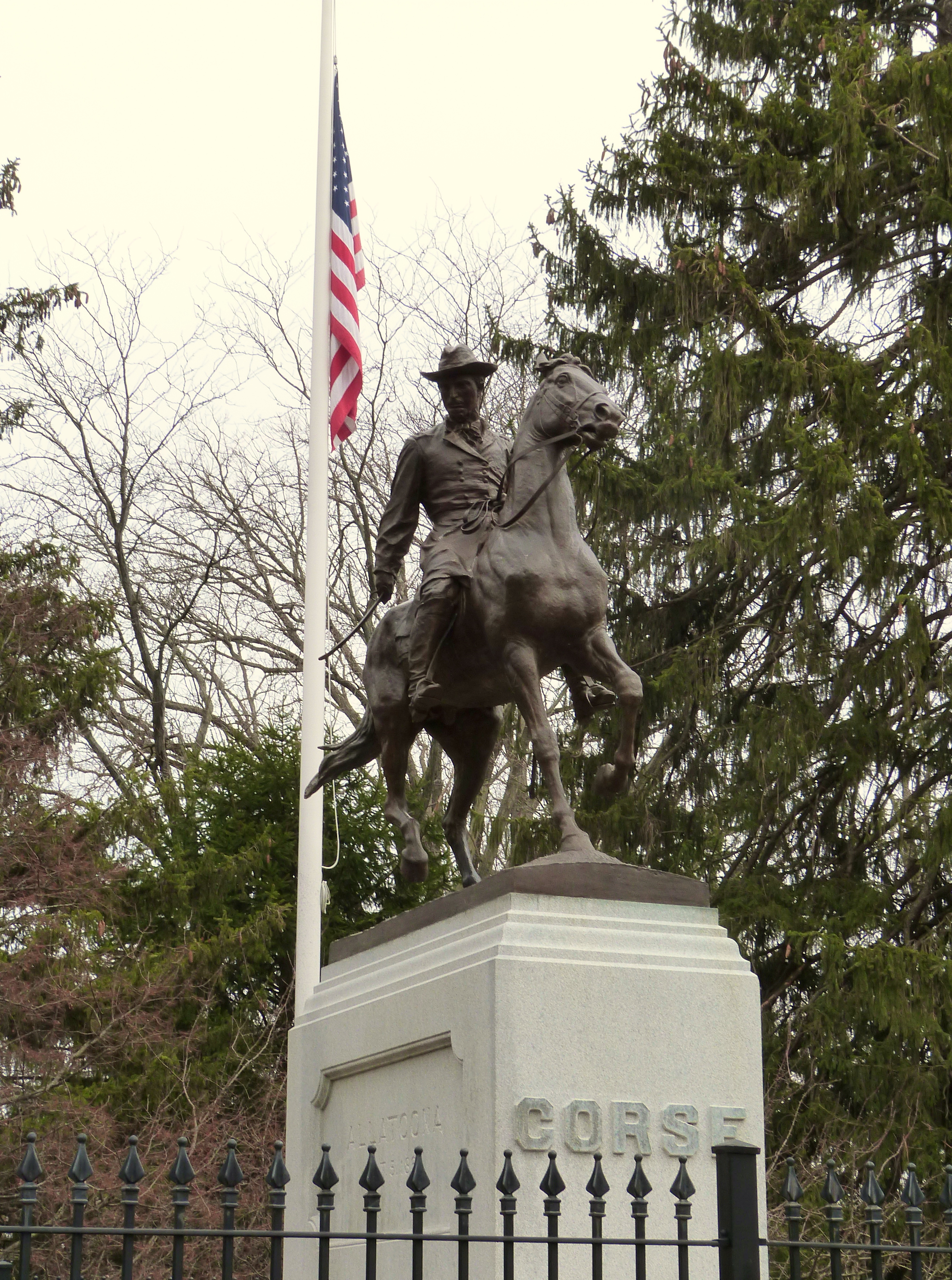
General John M. Corse (1896), Crapo Park, Burlington, Iowa.

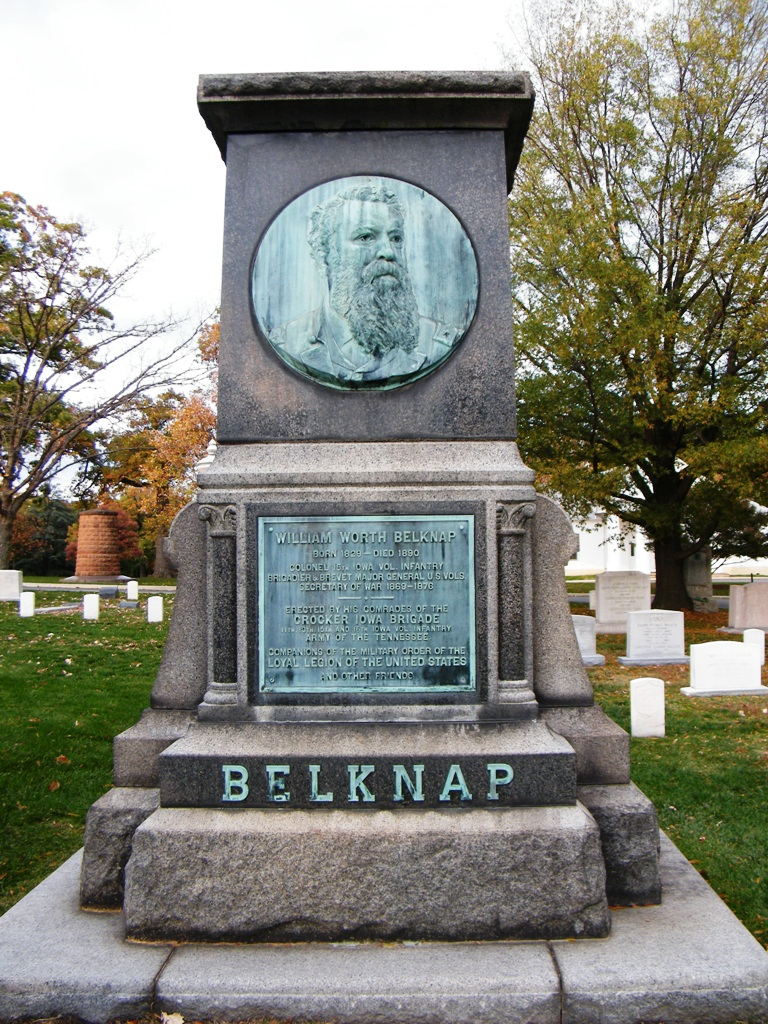
Belknap Monument (1897), Arlington National Cemetery, Arlington County, Virginia, United States.

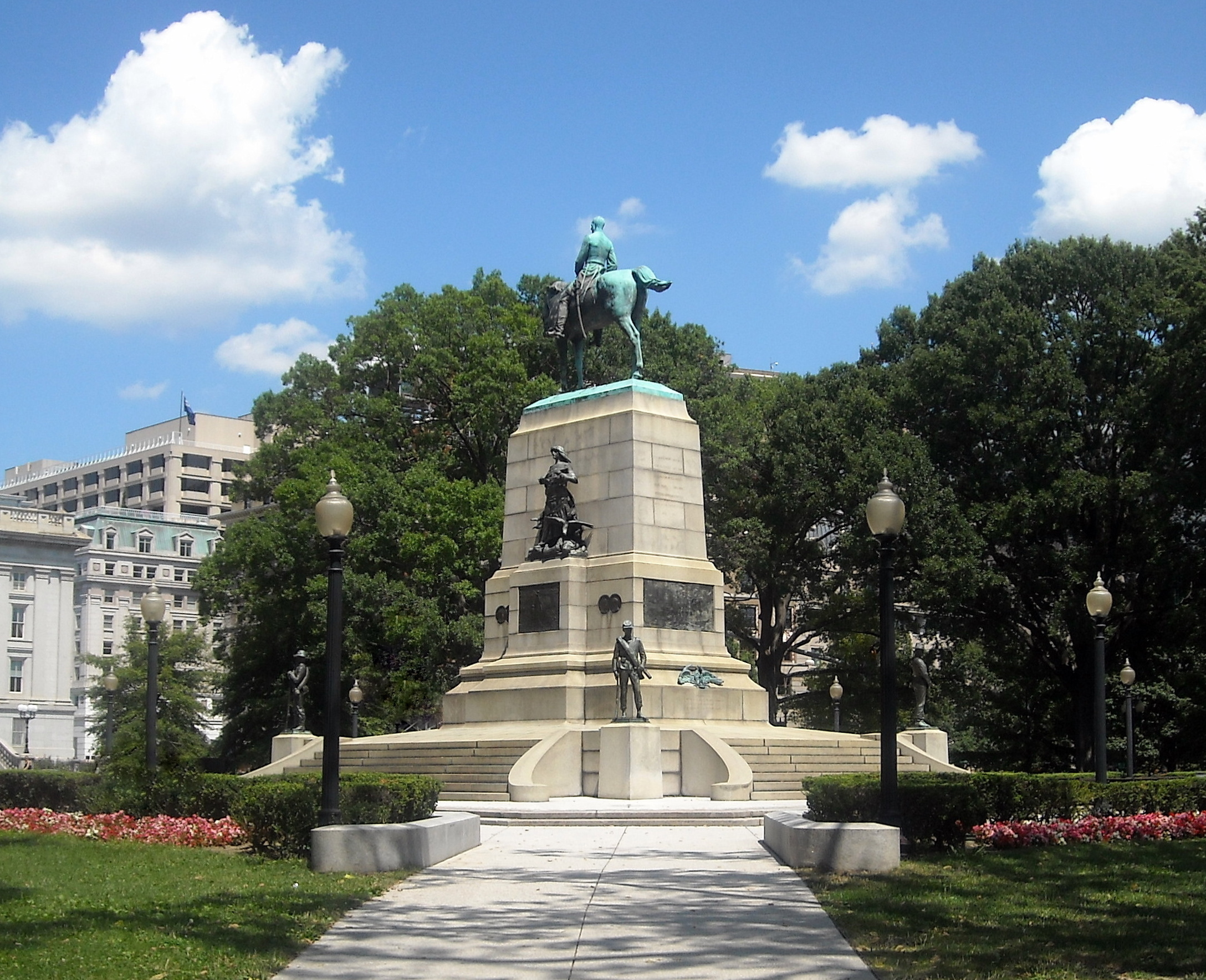
Sherman Monument (1896–1903), President's Park, Washington, D.C., United States

== Bibliography ==
- Album of Genealogy and Biograyhy, Cook County, Illinois. Chicago: Calumet Book & Engraving Co., 1898.
- Carr, Carolyn Kinder. Revisiting the White City: American Art at the 1893 World's Fair. Washington, D.C.: National Portrait Gallery, 1993.
- Dodge, Grenville Mellen. Personal Recollections of President Abraham Lincoln, General Ulysses S. Grant and General William T. Sherman. Council Bluffs, Iowa: The Monarch Printing Company, 1914.
- Goode, James M. The Outdoor Sculpture of Washington, D.C.: A Comprehensive Historical Guide. Washington, D.C.: Smithsonian Institution Press, 1974.
- Huang, Nian-Sheng. Benjamin Franklin in American Thought and Culture, 1790-1990. Philadelphia: American Philosophical Society, 1994.
- Jacob, Kathryn Allamong and Remsberg, Edwin Harlan. Testament to Union: Civil War Monuments in Washington, D.C. Baltimore, Md.: Johns Hopkins University Press, 1998.
- Keim, De B. Randolph; Rohl-Smith, Carl Vilhelm Daniel; and Griffin, Appleton P.C. Sherman. A Memorial in Art, Oratory, and Literature by the Society of the Army of Tennessee, With the Aid of the Congress of the United States of America. Washington, D.C.: Government Printing Office, 1904.
- Kirkland, Joseph. The Chicago Massacre of 1812: With Illustrations and Historical Documents. Chicago: Dibble Publishing, 1893.
- Klotter, James C. Kentucky Justice, Southern Honor, and American Manhood. Baton Rouge: Louisiana State University Press, 2006.
- Little, Carol Morris. A Comprehensive Guide to Outdoor Sculpture in Texas. Austin, Tex.: University of Texas Press, 1996.
- Petersen, Peter L. The Danes in America. Atlanta: Atlanta Book Company, 1980.
- Rand, McNally & Co.'s Handy Guide to Chicago and World's Columbian Exposition. Chicago: Rand, McNally & Co., 1893.
- Society of the Army of the Tennessee. Report of the Proceedings of the Society of the Army of the Tennessee at the Thirty-Fourth Meeting Held at Washington, D.C. Cincinnati: F.W. Freeman, 1906.
- Stock, Janice Beck. Amazing Iowa. Nashville, Tenn.: Rutledge Hill Press, 2003.
