= Theo A.R. Kitson =

American sculptor (1871–1932)

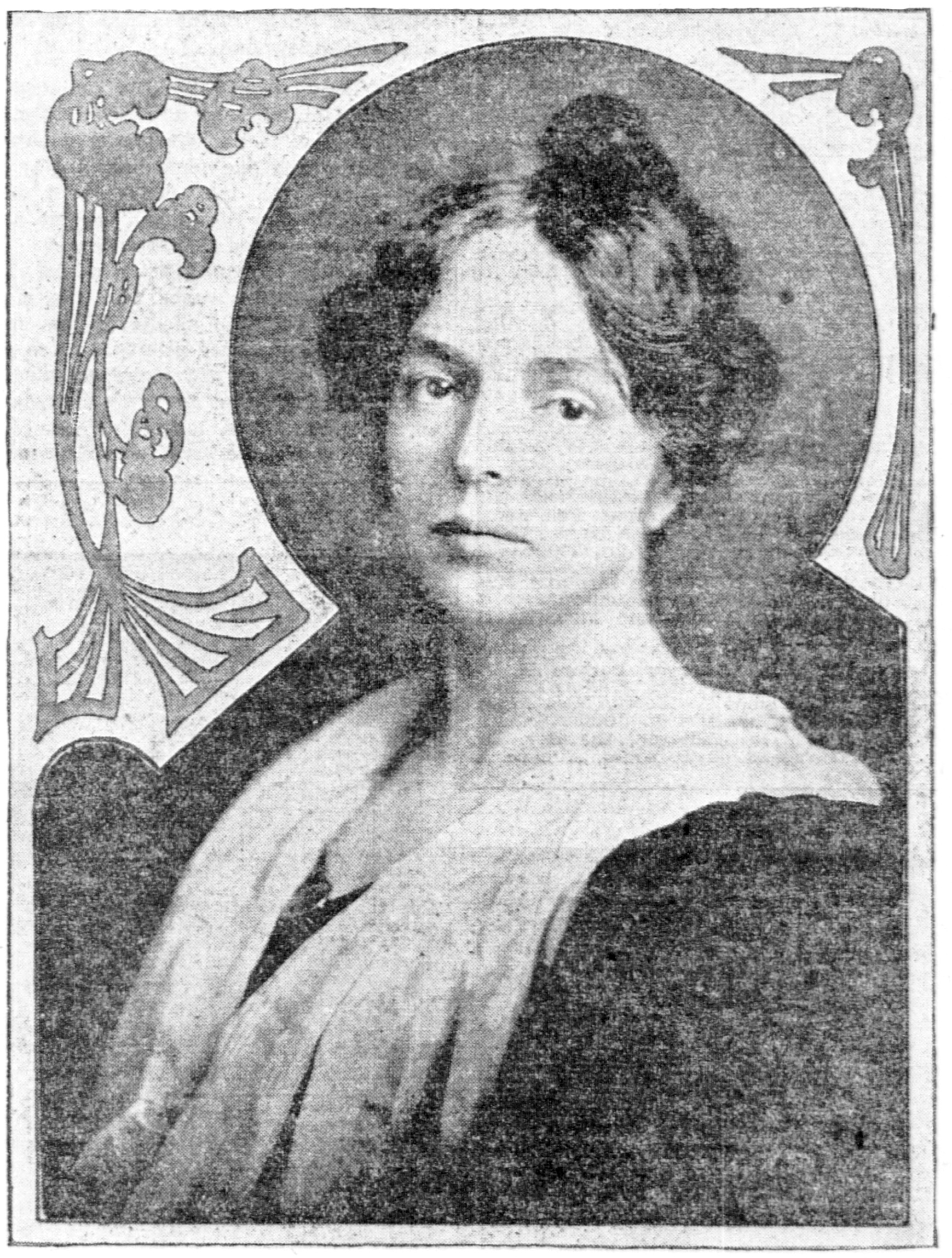
- in 1903
- Born: Theodora Alice Ruggles; January 29, 1871; Brookline, Massachusetts, U.S.
- Died: October 29, 1932 (aged 61); Boston, Massachusetts, U.S.
- Known for: Sculpture
- Spouse: Henry Hudson Kitson (m.1893-div.1909)

Theodora Alice Ruggles Kitson (née Ruggles, January 29, 1871 – October 29, 1932), known as Theo A.R. Kitson, was an American sculptor.

== Life ==
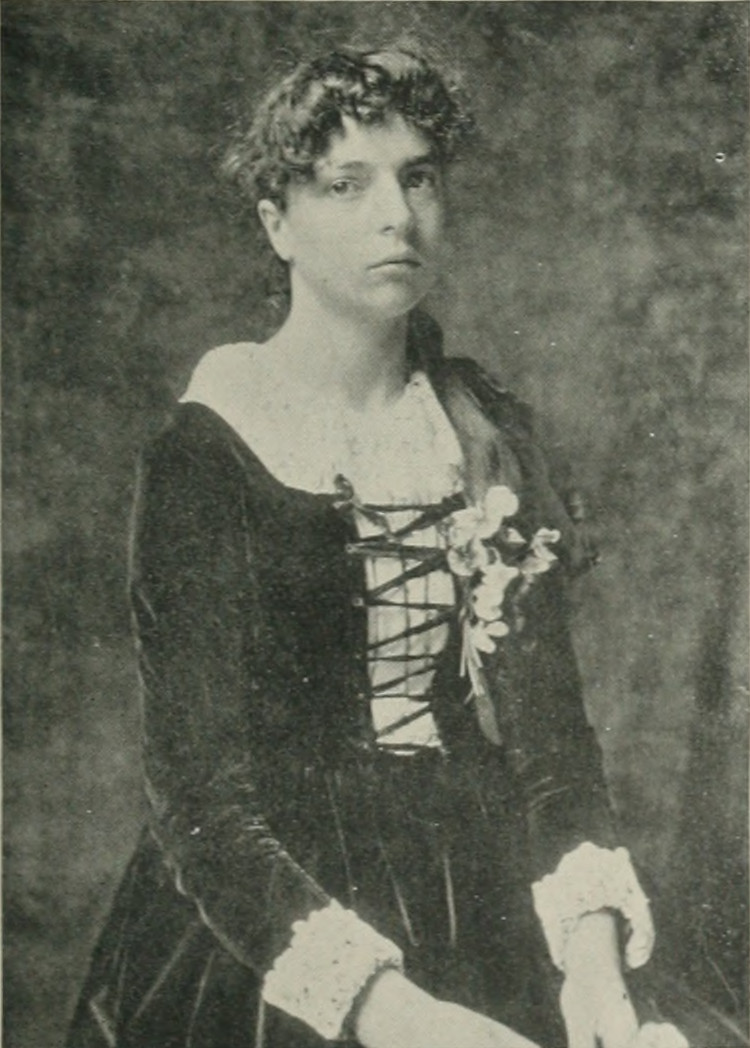
Theo Alice Ruggles Kitson, a woman of the century

Theodora Alice Ruggles was born in Brookline, Massachusetts, to Cyrus W. and Anna H. Ruggles. As a young child she displayed artistic talent, but when her mother attempted to enroll her in the School of the Museum of Fine Arts, Boston, she was informed that she was too young to be admitted. Her mother then approached other schools, which gave her the same advice. One of the school directors, however, suggested that she find a tutor for her and pointed her in the direction of a rising star, Henry Hudson Kitson.

She began studying with sculptor Henry Hudson Kitson in 1886, and married him in Boston in 1893 in the social event of the season. They had three children together, sons Theo and John and daughter Dorothy. In 1888, she won honorable mention at the Salon des Artistes Francais, becoming the youngest woman, and the first American woman, ever to receive the honor. She was lionized when she returned to the United States for this award and was asked to comment on everything from the state of American art to men's fashions. In 1895 she was the first woman to be admitted to the National Sculpture Society.

In the early 1900s, she designed seventy-three sculptures now located at various sites within Vicksburg National Military Park. Predominantly busts and portrait reliefs honoring the general officers from both sides that fought there, Kitson is the most prolific of the artists represented there. The Massachusetts state monument, dedicated on November 14, 1903, was the first state monument to be placed and dedicated in the park.

After the Kitsons separated in 1909, she moved to Farmington, where she maintained a studio until her 1932 death in Boston, Massachusetts. Her work is featured on the Boston Women's Heritage Trail.

In the course of her career she created many public monuments, both in conjunction with her husband and on her own. Her best known statue is The Hiker, a monument commemorating the soldiers who fought in the wars of the United States' turn of the 20th Century Manifest Destiny territorial expansion, the Spanish–American War, the Philippine–American War and the Boxer Rebellion. Around 50 versions of this work can be discovered spread over much of the United States.

== World's Fairs ==
Kitson exhibited at the 1893 World's Columbian Exposition. She was one of four female painters or sculptors who exhibited more than three works of art, including: A New England Fisherman (1892); On the Banks of the Oise (1889); Portrait Bust of an Italian Child (ca. 1887); and Young Orpheus (ca. 1890).

Additionally, she won a bronze medal at the 1904 St. Louis World's Fair.

== Selected works ==
- The Hiker
- "The Volunteer" soldier monument. Dedicated in Newburyport, Massachusetts on July 4, 1902. Reproductions in North Providence, Rhode Island, 1904; Walden, New York, 1904; Sharon, Massachusetts, 1908.
- Statue of Tadeusz Kościuszko, Boston Public Garden
- Mother Bickerdyke Memorial, Galesburg, Illinois
- Sherman Monument, Washington, D.C. She sculpted the medallions depicting corps commanders who served under Sherman in the U.S. Civil War.
- Monument to the 124th New York Volunteer Infantry Regiment, Goshen, New York
- Esek Hopkins Memorial, Providence, 1891
- The Wounded Color Sargeant, 1914, Topsfield, Massachusetts
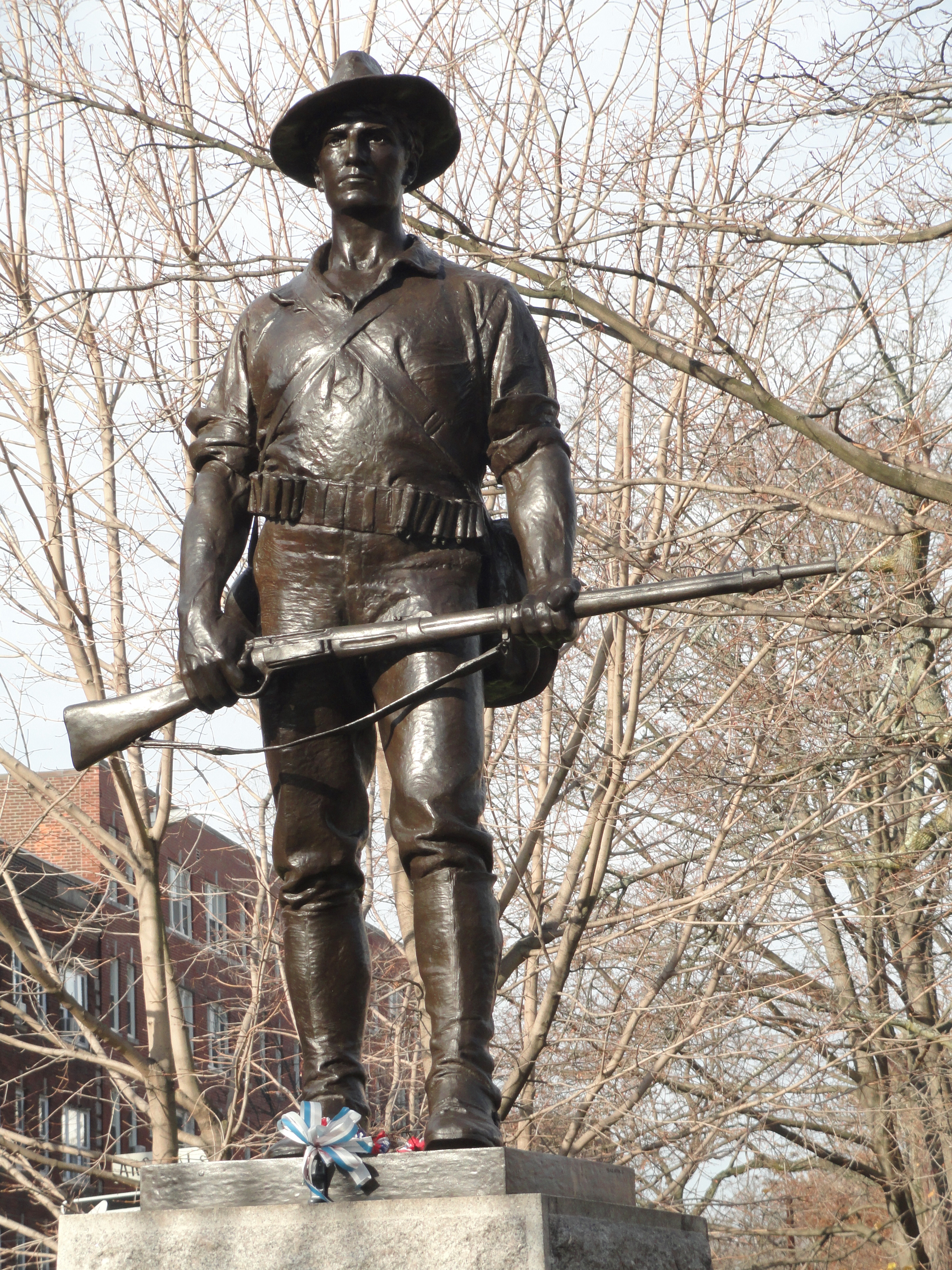
The Hiker

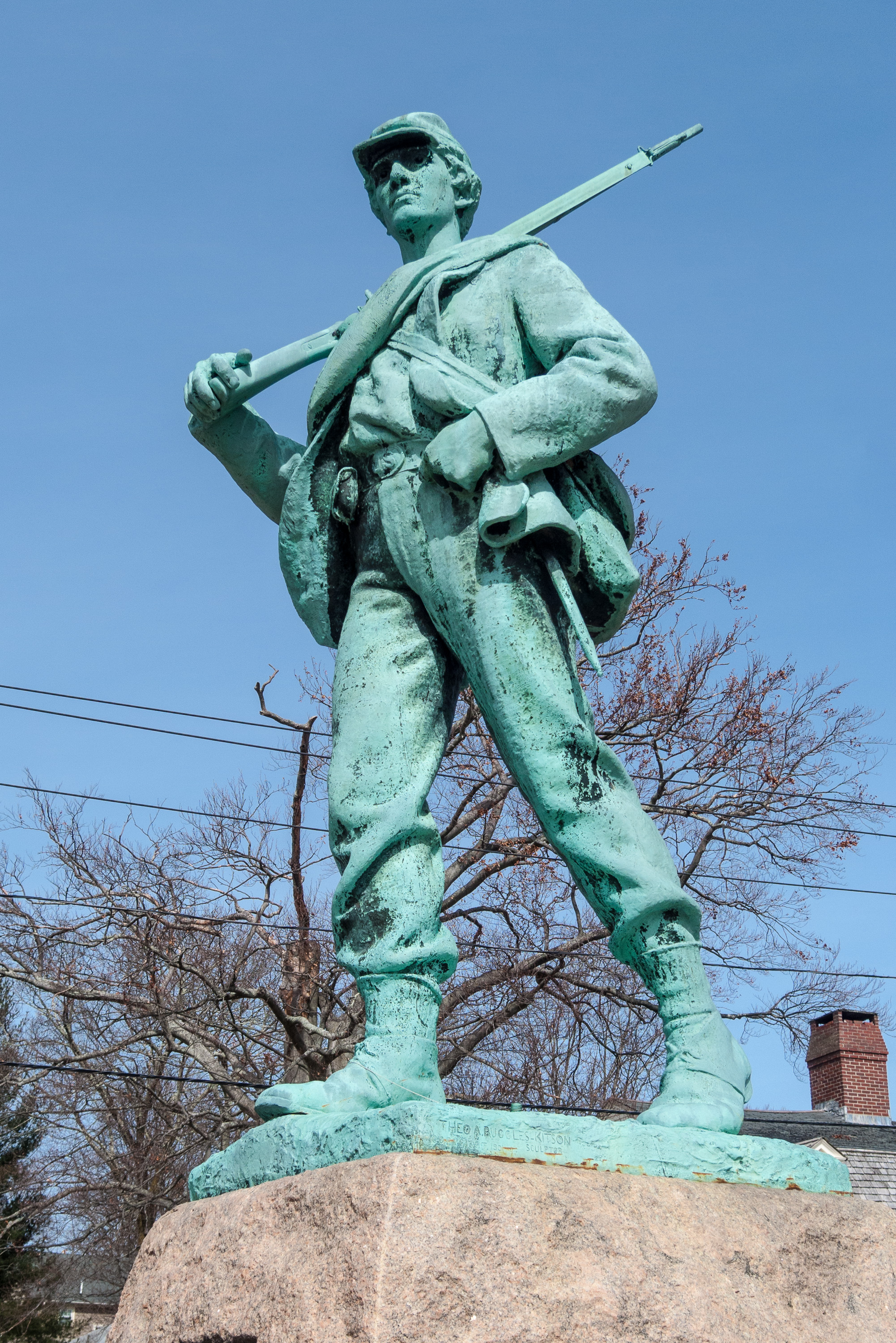
Soldiers and Sailors Monument in North Providence

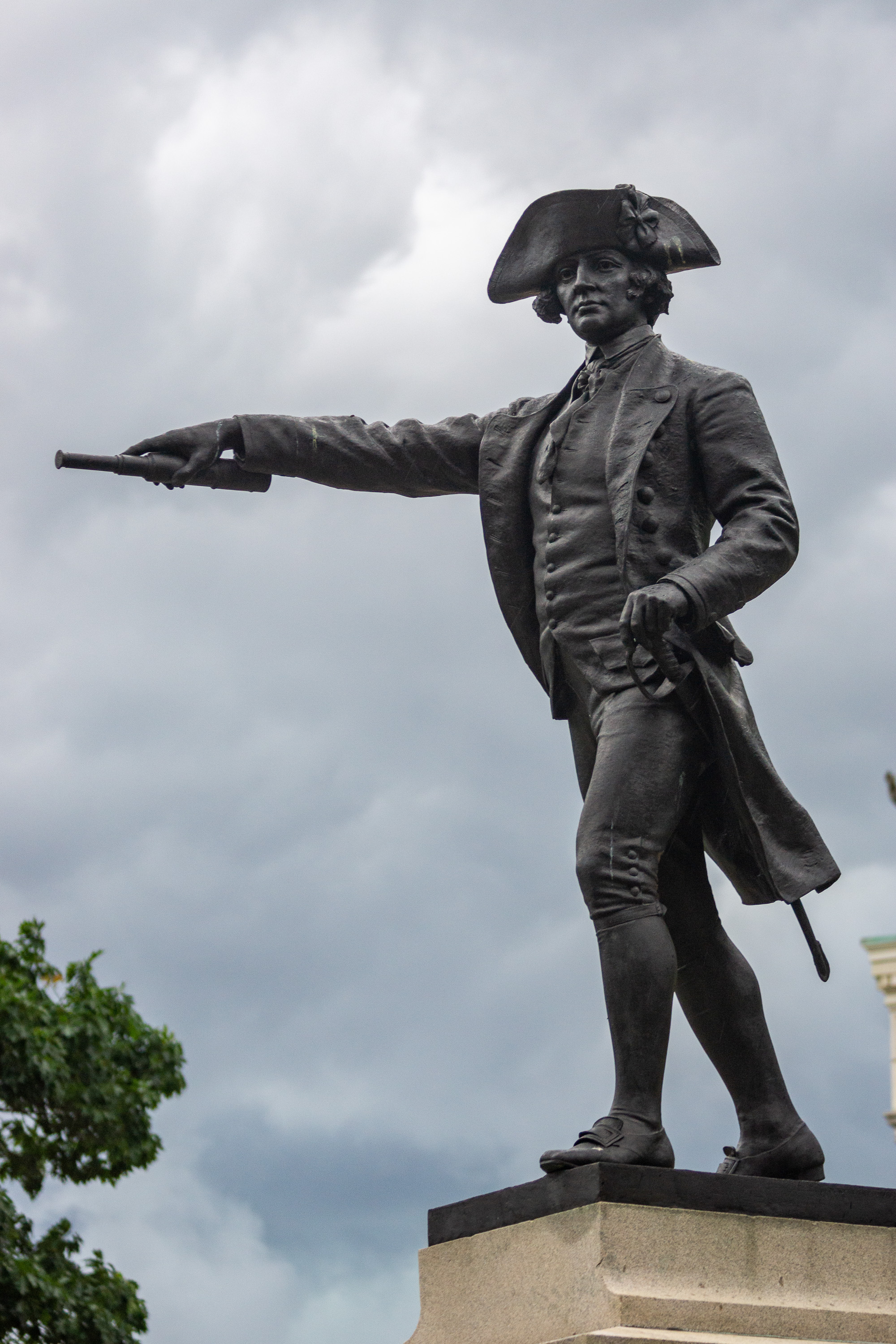
Esek Hopkins statue, Providence, 1891

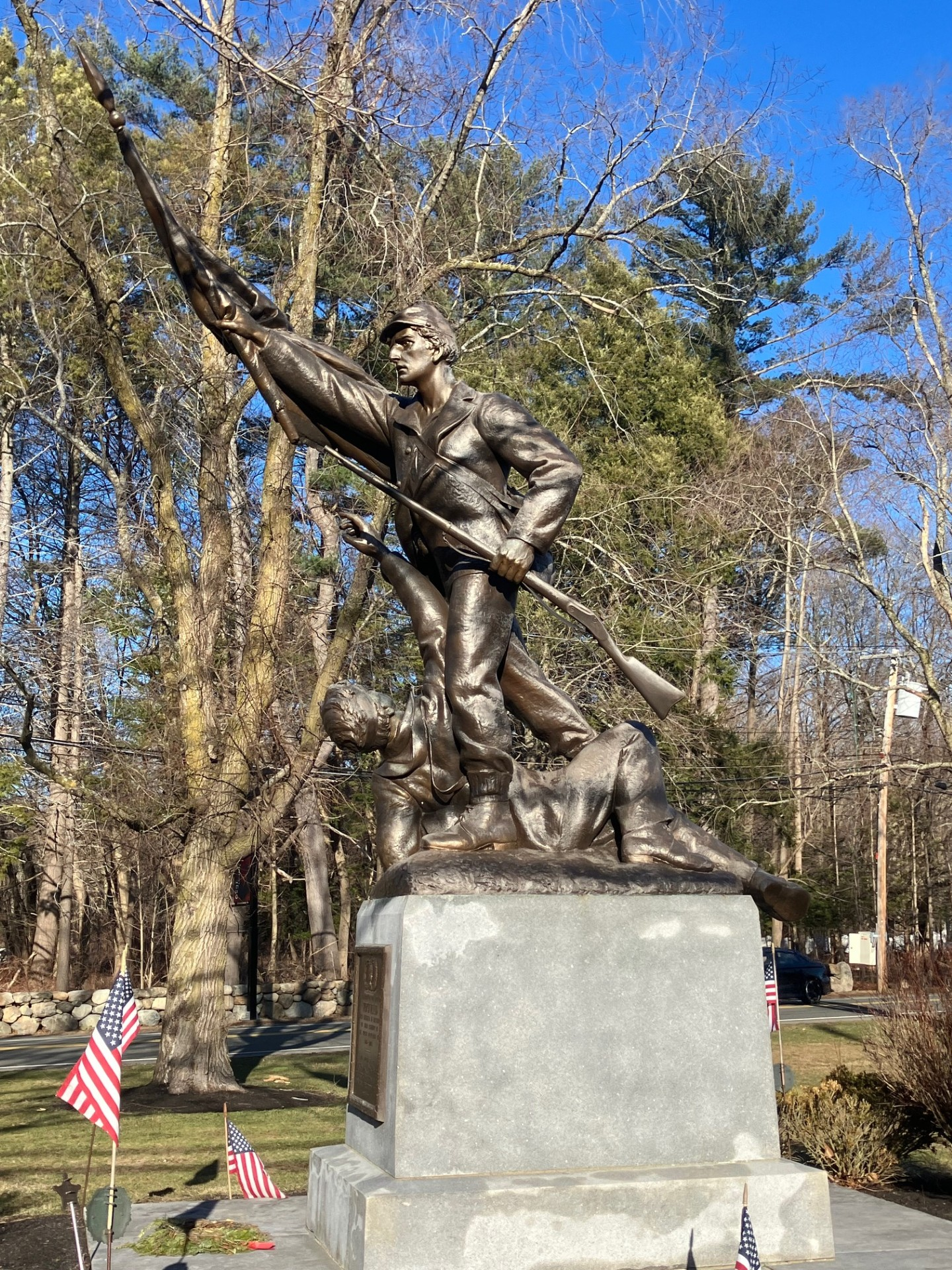
The Wounded Color Sargeant

=== Relief portraits at Vicksburg National Military Park ===
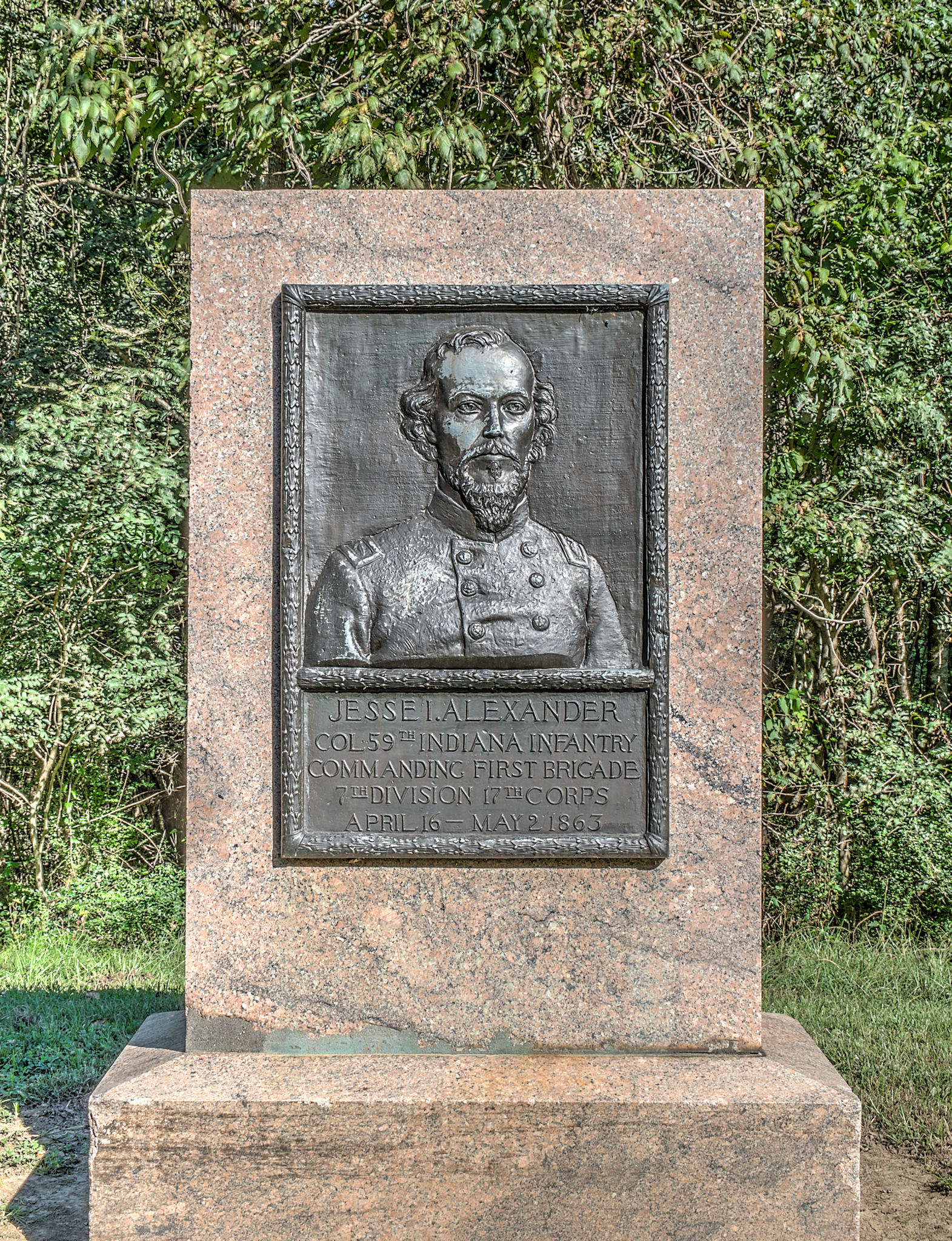
Col. Jesse I. Alexander, 1918

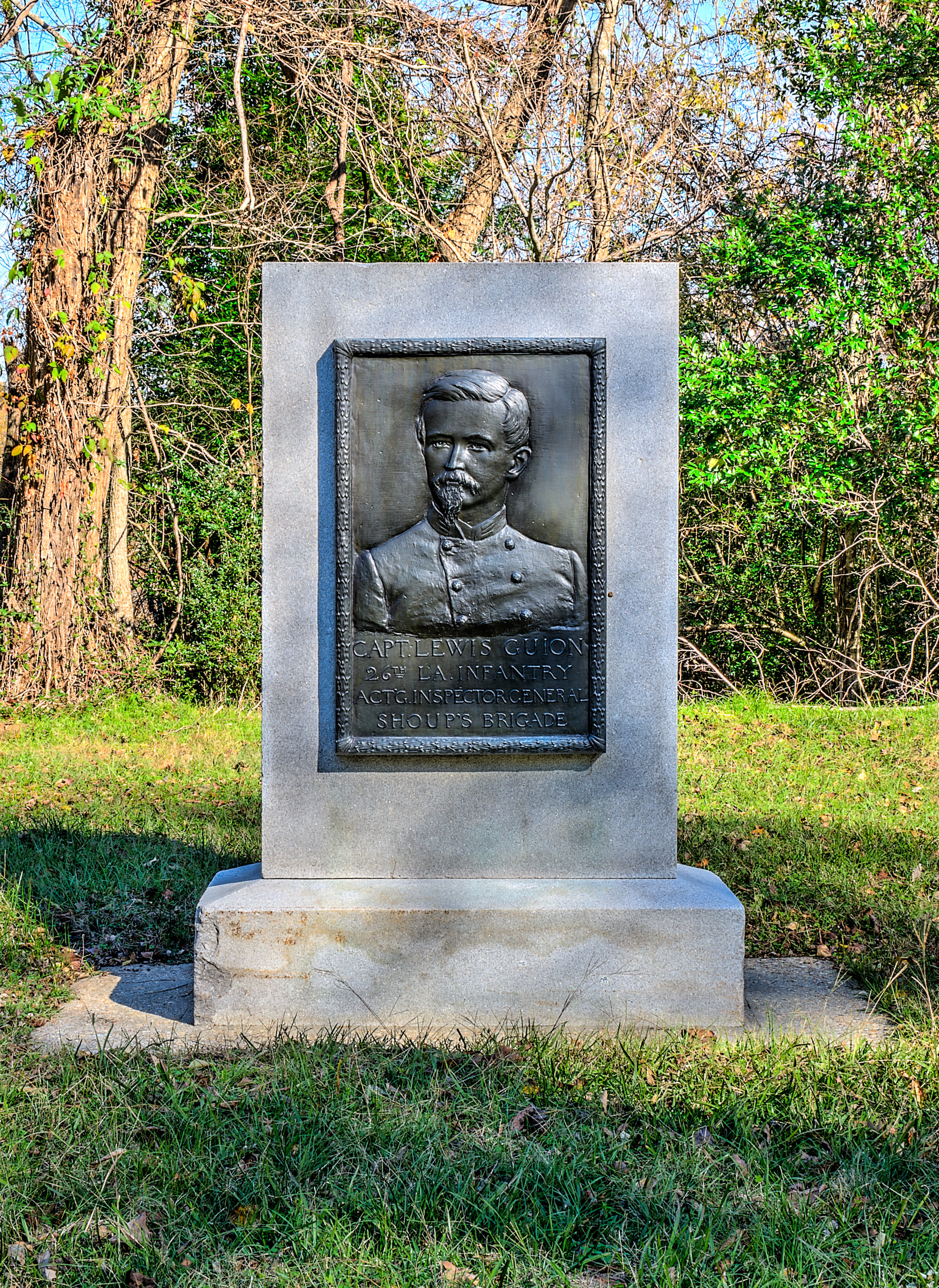
Capt. Louis Guion, 1920

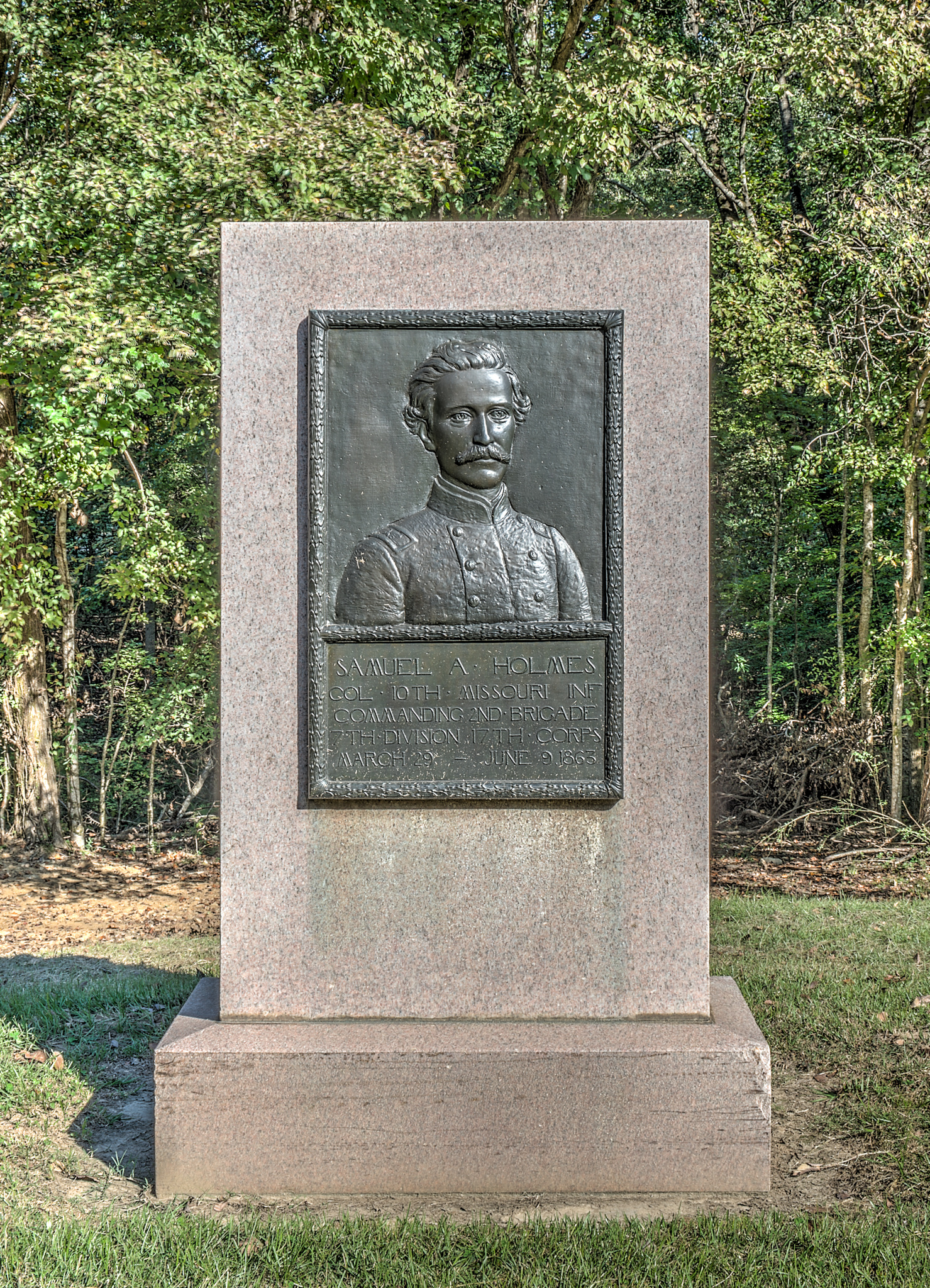
Col. Samuel A. Holmes, 1915

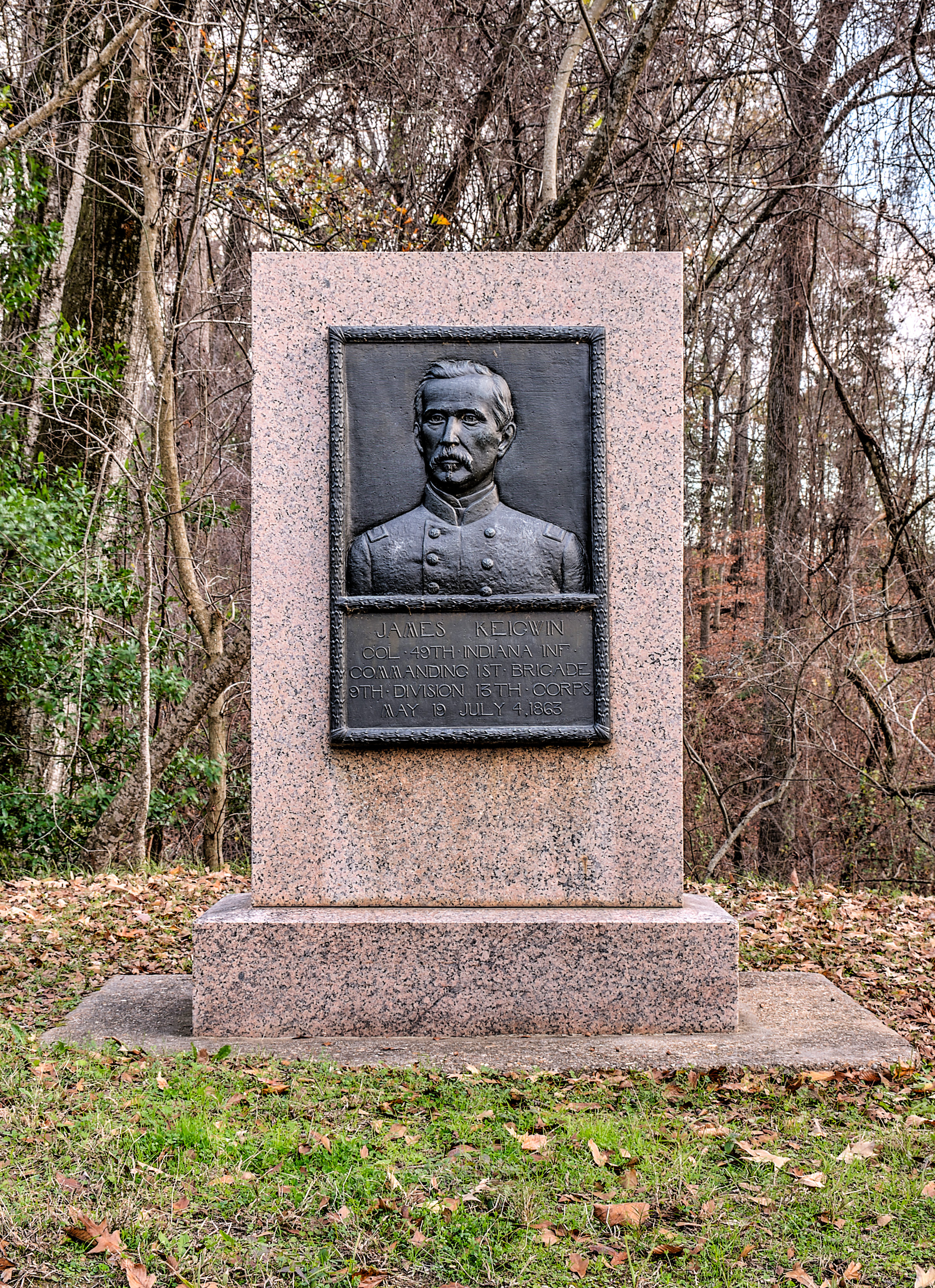
Col. James Keigwin, 1914

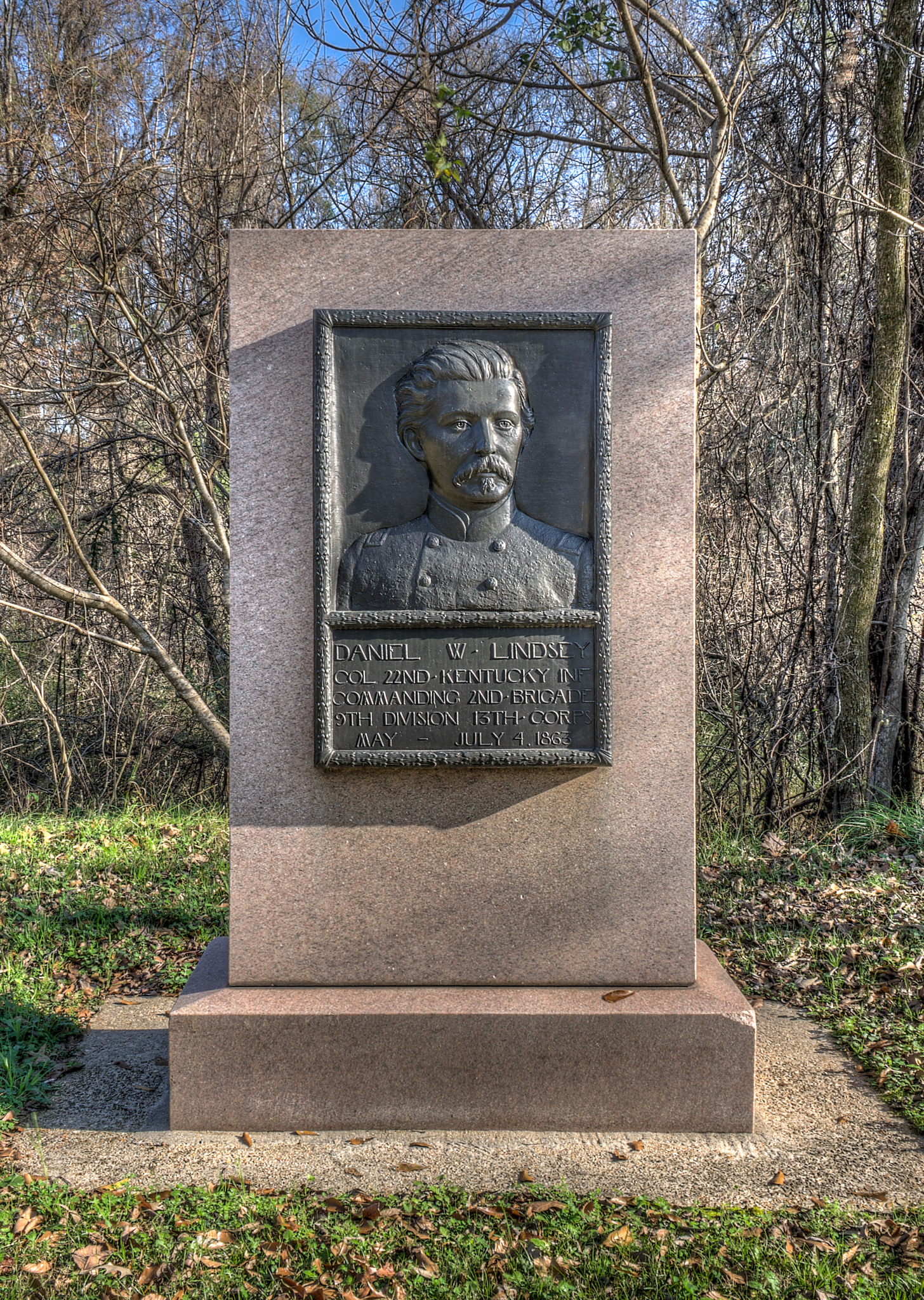
Col. Daniel W Lindsey, 1915

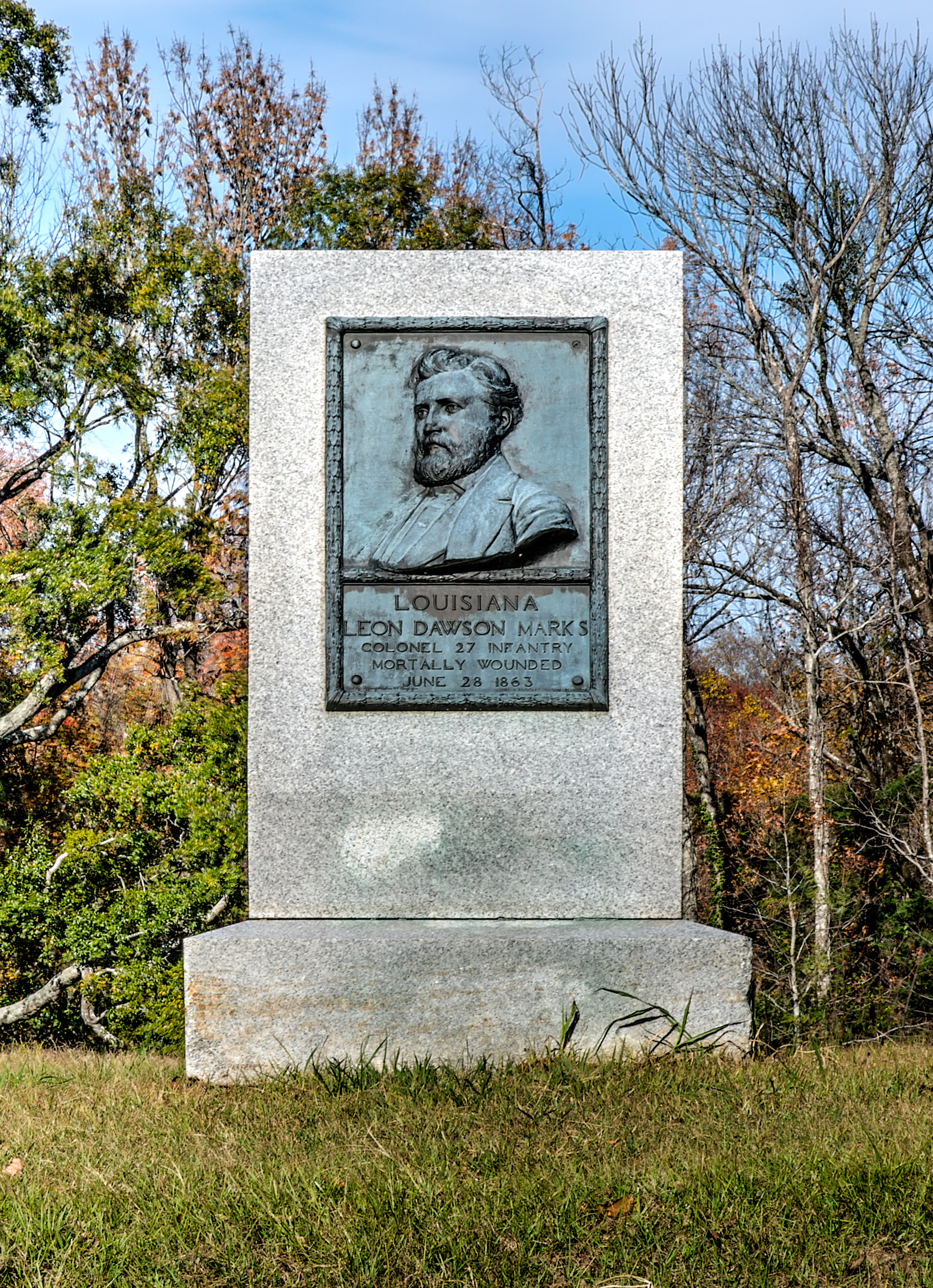
Col. Leon D. Marks, 1910

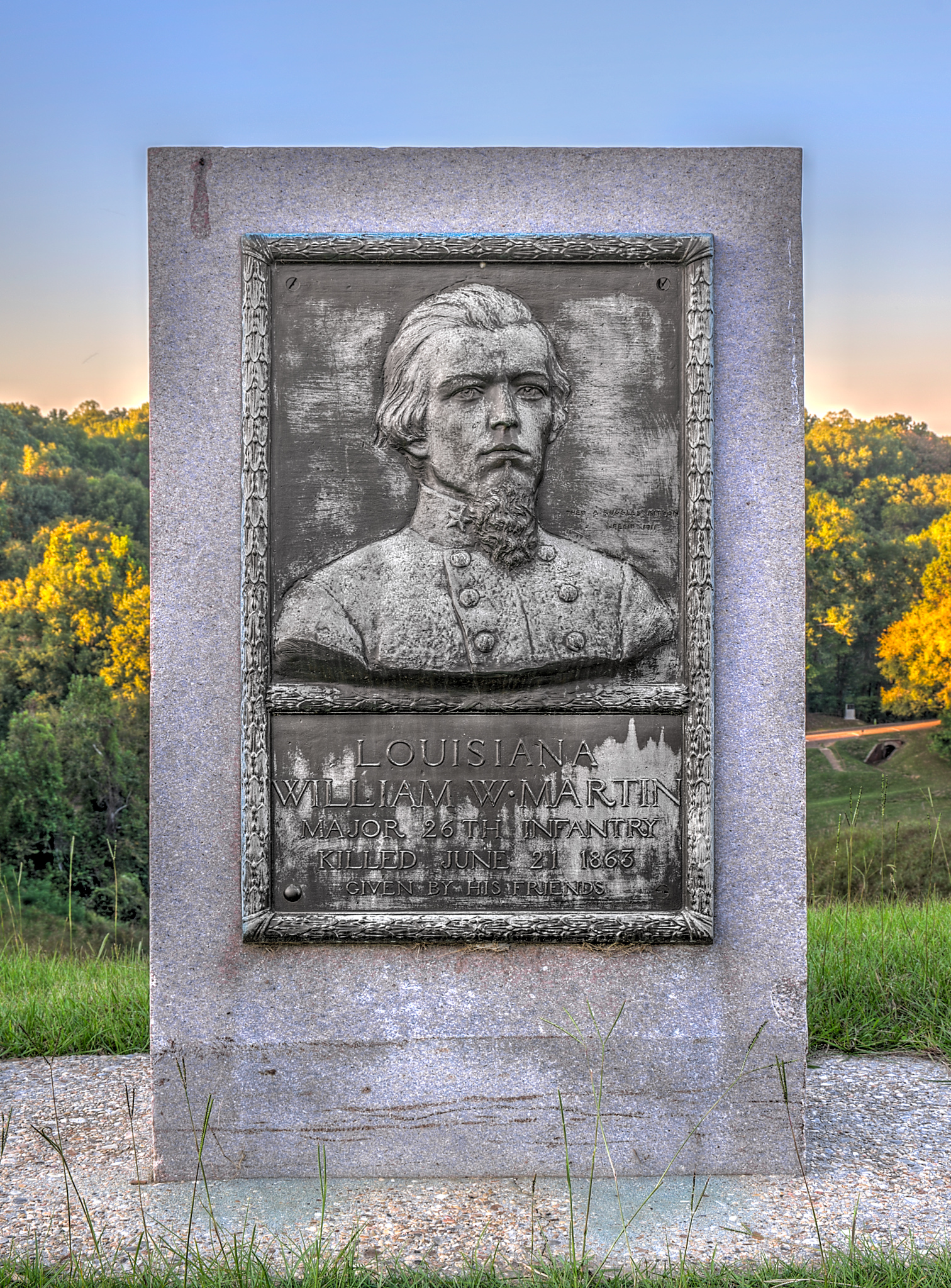
Maj. William W. Martin, 1911

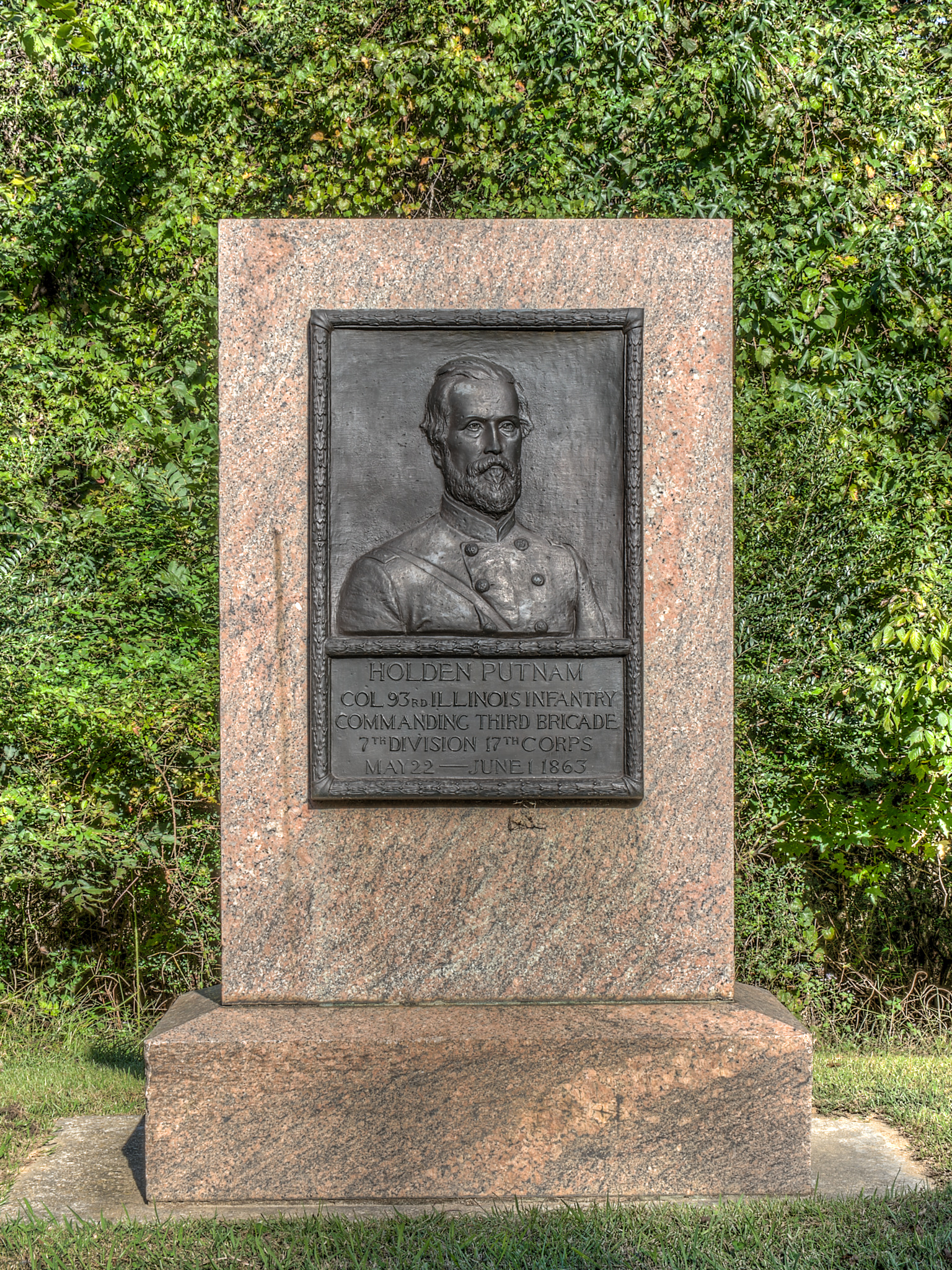
Col. Holden Putnam, 1919

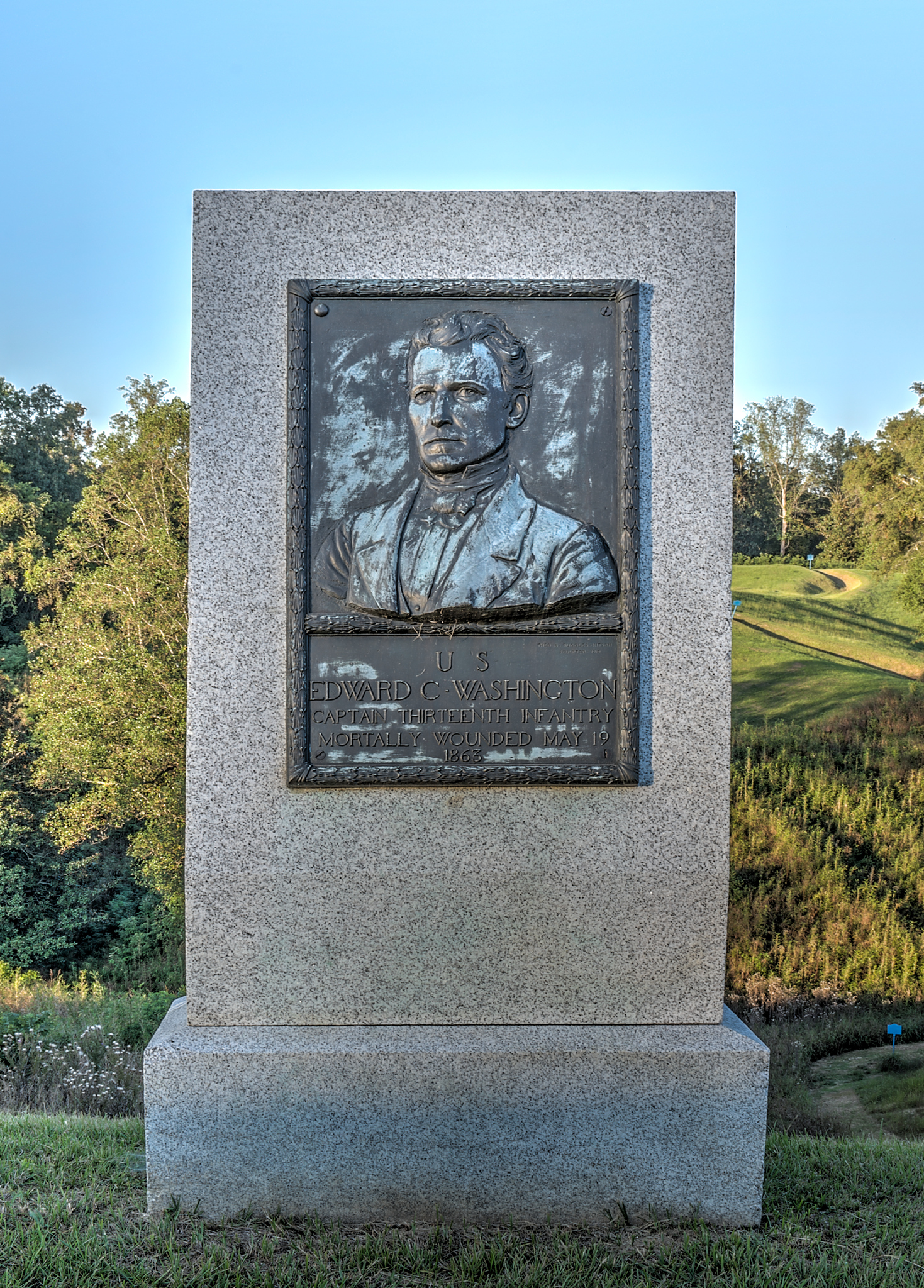
Capt. Edward C. Washington, 1910

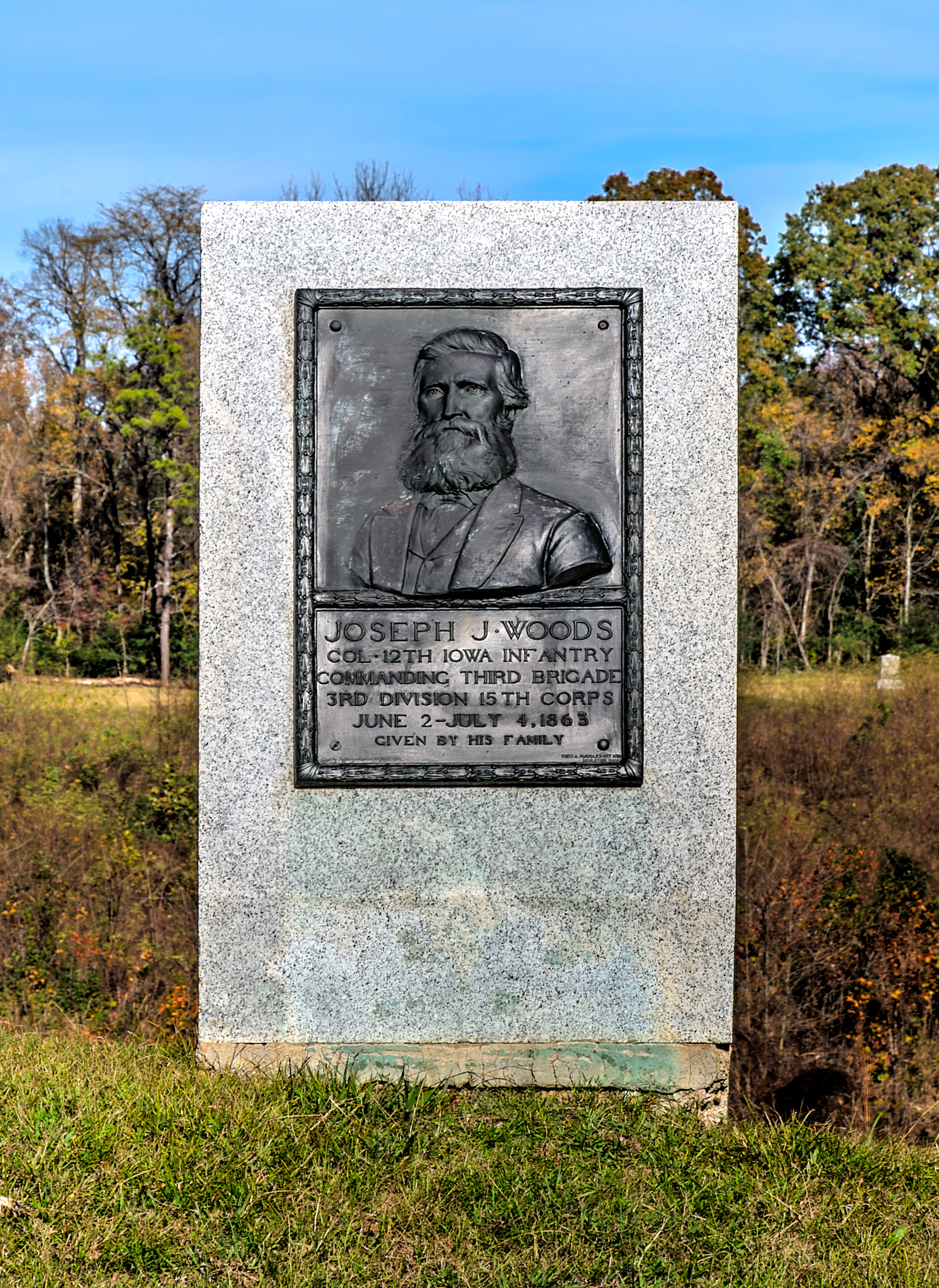
Col. Joseph J. Woods, 1910
