= Augustus Hurt house =

Coordinates: 33.766758°N 84.355442°W

The Augustus Hurt house, often erroneously cited as the Howard House, was General Sherman's temporary headquarters during the Battle of Atlanta. After the battle the house was torn down for firewood.

It was located on Copenhill, which in the 1890s became the Copenhill streetcar suburb of Atlanta, 2 miles (3.2 km) east of the city center. The neighborhood was razed for the site of a freeway interchange which was never built, and is now the site of the Carter Center.
