= Department of War Studies, King's College London =

Academic department at King's College London

Coordinates: 51.511491°N 0.115975°W

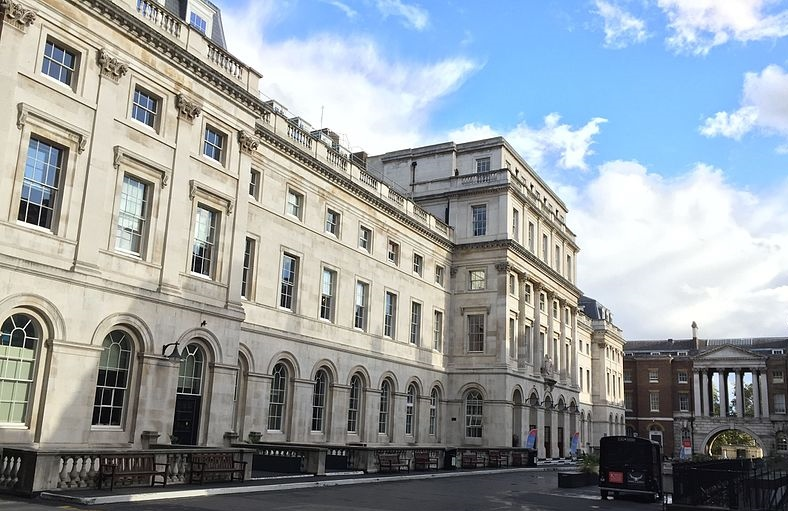
- King's Building, King's College London Strand Campus, where the Department of War Studies is located
- Established: 1962; 64 years ago
- Founder: Sir Michael Howard (historian)
- Parent institution: School of Security Studies (SSS), Faculty of Social Science & Public Policy (SSPP), King's College London
- Head of Department: Professor Rachel Kerr
- Academic staff: 100
- Students: 1,000
- Location: Strand, London
- Website: kcl.ac.uk/warstudies

The Department of War Studies (DWS) is an academic department in the School of Security Studies within the Faculty of Social Science & Public Policy at King's College London in London, United Kingdom.

Senior government officials, members of the military, diplomats, journalists, academics, and entrepreneurs are among the department's graduates. Amongst them are former Prime Minister of Jordan Marouf al-Bakhit; Special Representative of the UN Secretary-General for Iraq Nickolay Mladenov, the Dutch Minister for Foreign Trade and Development Cooperation Tom de Bruijn, the Swedish Minister for Defence Pål Jonson and former Commandant General Royal Marines Sir Robert Fry. It also houses research institutes and centres, including the Liddell Hart Centre for Military Archives.

It draws much of its faculty and visiting staff from the Euro-Atlantic intelligence, defence and diplomatic communities. They include former GCHQ chief David Omand; former foreign secretary Malcom Rifkind; former British ambassador to the US Nigel Sheinwald; ex-national security advisor Mark Lyall Grant; former head of MI6 John Sawers; and former chair of the UK’s Joint Intelligence Committee Peter Ricketts.

Since August 2026, the Head of Department has been Professor Rachel Kerr, the first woman to hold the position. The Department of War Studies is located on the 6th floor of the Grade I listed King's Building on the Strand Campus of King's College London. It offers a range of undergraduate, postgraduate, doctoral and post-doctoral programmes and opportunities, as well as a unique three-year War Studies bachelor's degree.

== History ==
A Department of Military Science existed at King's College London from 1848 to 1859. Military science was subsequently approved as a subject for the Bachelor of Arts and Bachelor of Science general degrees from 1913-14, and was taught under the Faculty of Arts as well as the Faculty of Engineering.

In 1926 the intervention of William Norton Medlicott prevented the Department of History from ridding itself of the lectureship in military history. With War Office support, the Military Studies Department was established in 1927 by the University of London following University of Oxford's example, and formed part of the Faculty of Arts, with Major General Sir Frederick Barton Maurice holding the Chair. It became known as the War Studies Department in 1943 but was discontinued in 1948, although the subject continued to be taught under the Department of Medieval and Modern History.

Following World War II, there was an initiative by senior members of University of London notably Lionel Robbins, Sir Charles Webster and Keith Hancock, to revive military studies at the university. In 1953, Sir Michael Howard was appointed to the Lectureship in Military Studies, and by 1962 Sir Michael was able to reinstate the Department of War Studies to offer postgraduate courses.

A Bachelor of Arts degree in War Studies was offered from 1992 onwards. The department became part of the School of Humanities in 1989 and the School of Social Science and Public Policy in 2001.

In 2022 the department celebrated its 60th anniversary with a series of events.

== Ukraine conflict research and analysis ==
Since the start of Russia's full-scale invasion of Ukraine in February 2022, academics from the department have played a world-leading role in providing research and commentary on the war.

In the first 12 months of the war, staff from the department contributed expertise to 26,120 articles and news broadcasts, including syndicated articles and repeat broadcasts, for outlets such as The Financial Times, The Washington Post, The Associated Press, The Sunday Times, Newsweek, the BBC and Channel 4, among others.

The department received recognition for its contribution to global understanding of the conflict from the Public Relations and Communications Association, receiving highly commended for its 'Ukraine Explained' series, which brought together over 40 essays from its academics on the crisis.

In 2022, the department launched the London Defence Conference in collaboration with current affairs analysis and news site Reaction. In 2023, following the G7 summit in Hiroshima, Prime Minister Rishi Sunak spoke at the conference, where he described the People's Republic of China as an "epoch defining challenge to us".

== Notable alumni and students ==
=== Government and politics ===
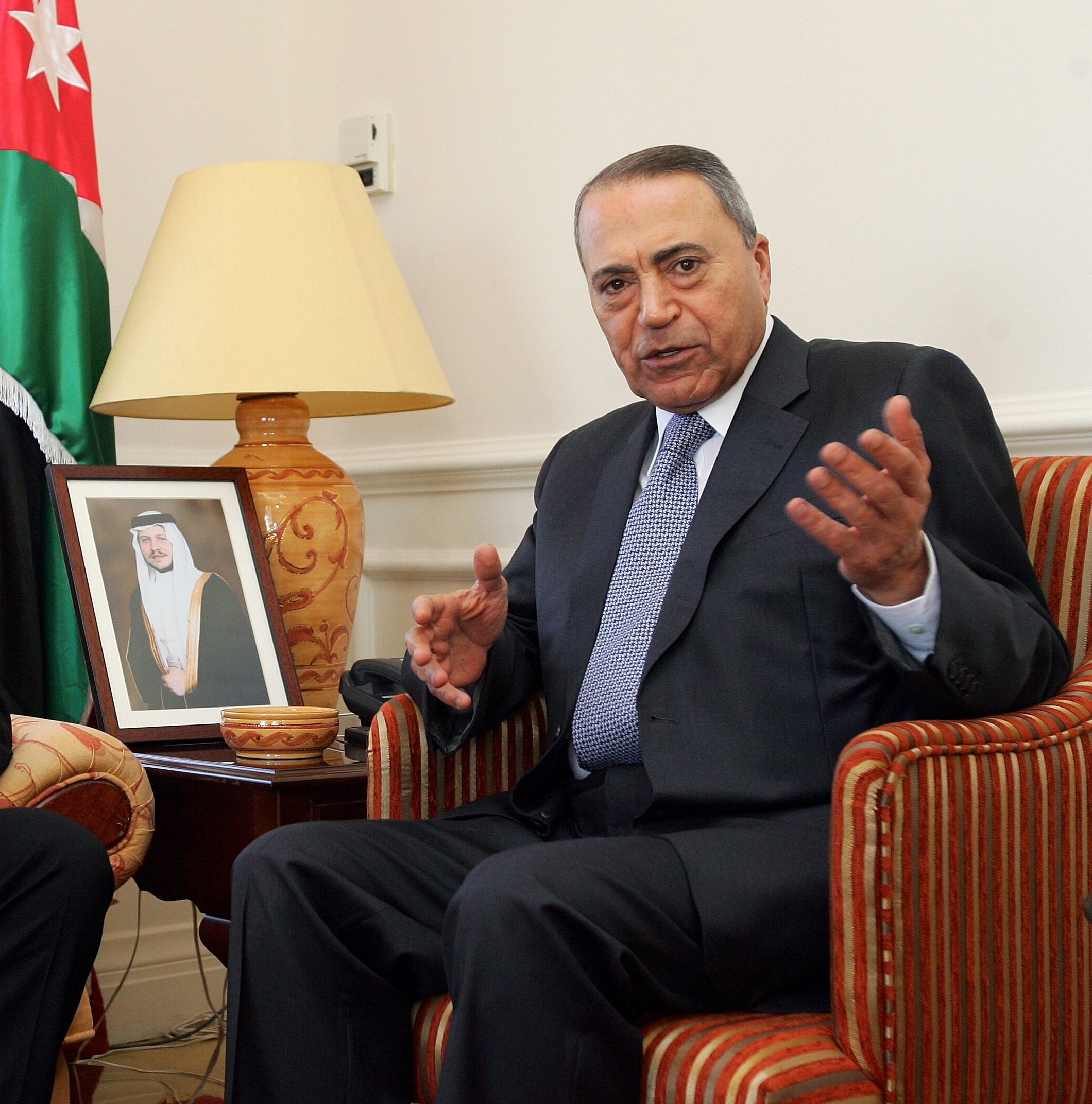
Prime Minister of Jordan Marouf al-Bakhit

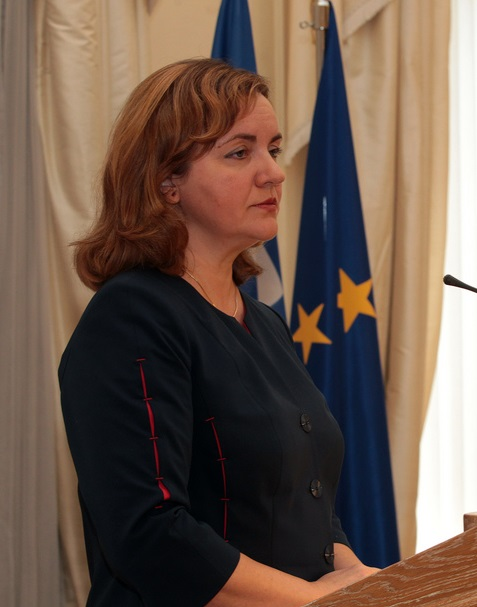
Acting Prime Minister of Moldova Natalia Gherman

- Marouf al-Bakhit (PhD 1990), former Prime Minister of Jordan
- Martin Bourke (MA 1970), former Governor of the Turks and Caicos Islands
- Tom de Bruijn (MA 1974), Dutch Minister for Foreign Trade and Development Cooperation
- Eoghan Murphy (MA 2005), former Irish Minister for Housing, Planning and Local Government.
- Tan Chuan-Jin (MA 1999), Speaker of the Parliament of Singapore
- Kayode Fayemi (PhD 1987), Nigerian Governor
- Mark Francois (MA 1987), Conservative Member of UK Parliament
- John Freeman (PhD 1984) Governor of the Turks and Caicos Islands
- Christopher Geidt, Baron Geidt (MA 1987), Crossbench peer
- Natalia Gherman (MA 1999), former Acting Prime Minister of Moldova
- John Hillen (MA 1993), former US Assistant Secretary of State for Political-Military Affairs
- Dan Jarvis (MA 2011), Labour Member of UK Parliament and Secretary of State for Defence
- Imran Ahmad Khan (BA, 1996), Conservative Member of UK Parliament
- Nickolay Mladenov (MA 1996), UN Special Coordinator for the Middle East Peace Process
- Jiří Šedivý (MA 1994), Director of European Defence Agency, former Permanent Representative of the Czech Republic to NATO
- Keith Simpson (postgraduate research 1972), former Conservative Member of Parliament
- Pritam Singh (MA 2004), Singaporean Opposition Leader
- Shaun Spiers (MA 1985), former Labour Member of the European Parliament
- Eleni Stavrou (MA; PhD), Member of the Cyprus House of Representatives

=== Military, security and diplomacy ===
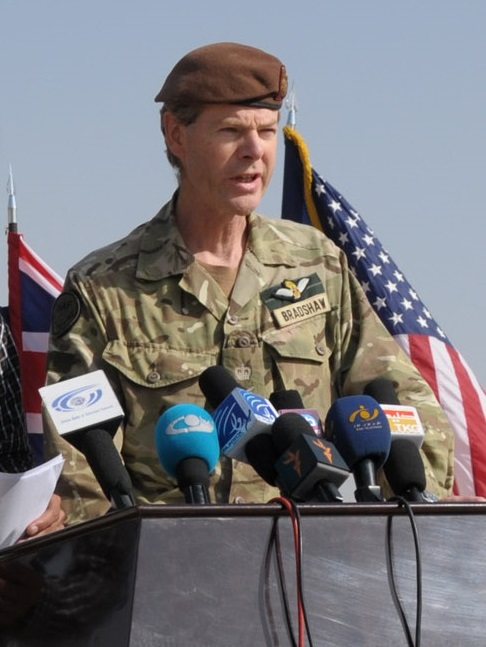
Deputy Supreme Allied Commander Europe Sir Adrian Bradshaw

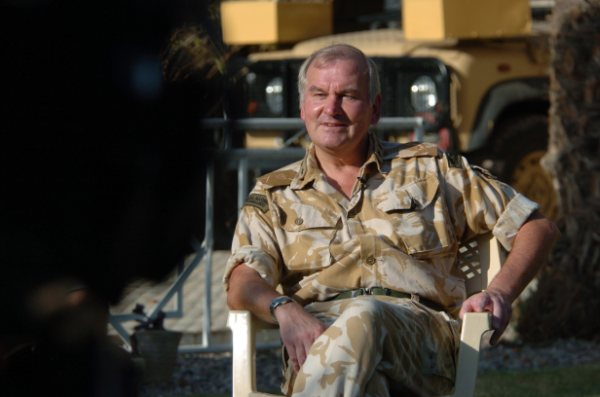
Commandant General Royal Marines Sir Robert Fry

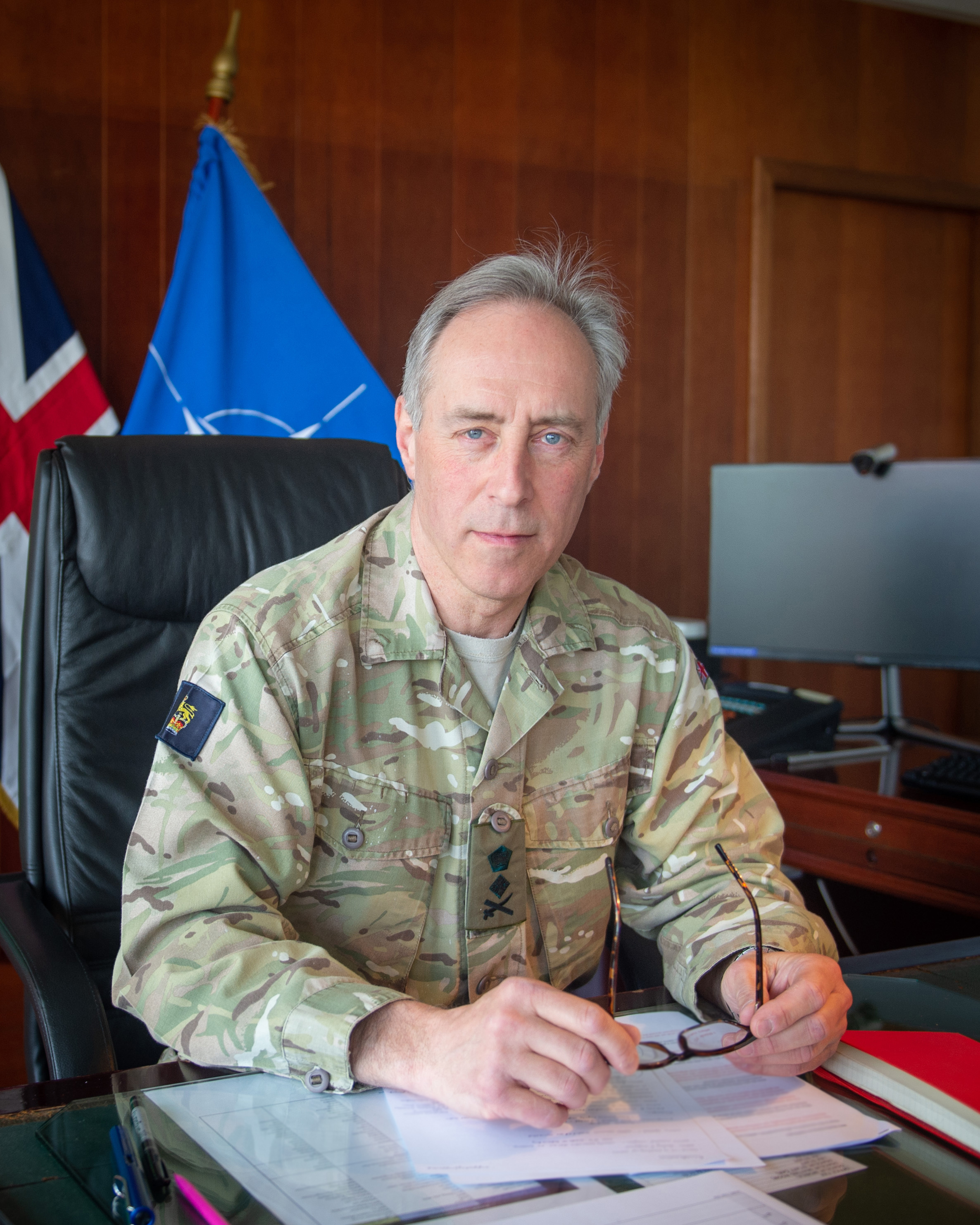
Deputy Supreme Allied Commander Europe Sir Tim Radford

- A. T. M. Zahirul Alam (MA 1993), former Force Commander of United Nations Mission in Liberia
- Sir Adrian Bradshaw (MA 2005), former Deputy Supreme Allied Commander Europe and former UK Commander of Land Forces
- Paul Crespo (MA 1990), former US Marine captain, risk analyst and activist
- Peter Drissell (MA 1994), former Commandant-General of the RAF Regiment
- Richard A. Falkenrath (PhD 1993), former Deputy Commissioner for Counterterrorism at NYPD
- Sir Robert Fry (MA 1987), former Commandant General Royal Marines
- Sir Wira Gardiner (MA 1980), New Zealander public servant
- Judith Gough (MA 2012), British Ambassador to Sweden
- Syed Ata Hasnain (MA 2006), former Military Secretary of the Indian Army
- Md Hashim bin Hussein (MA 1991), former Chief of the Malaysian Army
- Ola Ibrahim (MA 2002), former Chief of the Defence Staff of the Nigerian Armed Forces
- Martin Kimani (MA 2003, PhD 2010), Kenya's Permanent Representative to the United Nations
- Ahmad Massoud (BA, 2015), President of the National Resistance Front of Afghanistan
- Sir Simon Mayall (MA 2003), former British Deputy Chief of the Defence Staff
- Nawaf Obaid (MA 2011, PhD 2013), political scientist and former Saudi foreign policy advisor
- Sir Tim Radford (MA), Deputy Supreme Allied Commander Europe
- Maroof Raza (MA), Indian strategic affairs analyst
- Frank A. Rose (MA 1999), US Assistant Secretary of State for Arms Control, Verification, and Compliance
- Ayesha Siddiqa (PhD 1996), Pakistani military scientist
- Stuart Skeates (MA 1999), British Standing Joint Force Commander
- Tsai Ming-yen (PhD 2000), Director-General of the National Security Bureau (Taiwan)

=== Academia, media and business ===
- Ali M. Ansari (MA 1990), Professor of History at the University of St Andrews
- Ruaridh Arrow (BA 2001), Senior producer BBC Newsnight, writer and film-maker
- Abdul Razak Baginda, (MA 1984), Malaysian political analyst
- Brian Bond (MA 1962), Military historian
- Ahron Bregman (PhD 1994), British-Israeli political scientist
- Paula Broadwell (PhD Student), biographer of General David Petraeus
- Matthew Bryden (PhD Student), Canadian political activist
- Gwynne Dyer (PhD 1973), journalist
- Andrew Exum (PhD 2010), Middle East Scholar
- Daniel Ford (MA 2010), author
- Ian Gooderson (MA PhD), Naval historian
- Andrew Gordon (PhD 1983), Naval historian
- Eric Grove (MA 1971), British Naval historian
- Rosemary Hollis (MA 1975) British political scientist
- Andrew Lambert (MA PhD), Military historian
- Michael A. Levi (PhD 2006), CFR Senior Fellow
- Sophie Long (BA 1997), BBC News presenter
- Diana Magnay (MA 2016), journalist
- Peter R. Neumann (PhD 2002), Terrorism expert
- Peter Paret (PhD 1960), Military historian
- Philip Sabin (PhD 1984), Military historian
- Yezid Sayigh (PhD 1987), Middle East scholar
- Gary Sheffield (PhD 1994), Military historian
- David Stahel (MA 2000), historian
- Nicholas Stuart (MA 1984), journalist
- Geoffrey Till (PhD 1976), Maritime historian
- Alexander Windsor, Earl of Ulster (BA 1996), Director of Transnational Crisis Project
- Kieran West (MA 2005), Olympic gold medal-winning rower
- Colin White (MA 1975), former Director of the Royal Naval Museum

== Past and present faculty ==
Heads of Department
Period	Head
1962–1968	Sir Michael Howard
1968–1978	Sir Laurence Martin
1978–1982	Wolf Mendl
1982–1997	Sir Lawrence Freedman
1997–2001	Christopher Dandeker
2001–2007	Brian Holden-Reid
2007–2013	Mervyn Frost
2013–2016	Theo Farrell
2016–2019	Michael Rainsborough
2019–2023	Michael Goodman
2023–2026	Matthew Moran
2026–today	Rachel Kerr

- James M. Acton
- Robert J. Art
- Mats Berdal
- Felix Berenskötter
- David Betz
- John Bew
- Didier Bigo
- Philip Bobbitt
- Brian Bond
- Ahron Bregman
- Martin Bricknell
- Bill Durodié
- Nicholas Eftimiades
- Joel Hayward
- Michael Howard
- Vivienne Jabri
- Ashley Jackson
- Mark Laity
- Andrew Lambert
- Lawrence Freedman
- Thomas Gomart
- Barry M. Gough
- Beatrice Heuser
- Richard Ned Lebow
- Anatol Lieven
- Colin J. McInnes
- Anand Menon
- John Nagl
- Peter R. Neumann
- David Omand
- Richard Overy
- Friedbert Pflüger
- Jonathon Riley
- Andrew Roberts
- Philip Sabin
- John Sawers
- Yezid Sayigh
- Nigel Sheinwald
- Jack Spence
- Julian Thompson
- Cedric Thornberry
- Guglielmo Verdirame
- Kenneth Waltz
- Simon Wessely
- Ken Young
- Peter Zimmerman

== Tolstoy Cup ==
The Tolstoy Cup is an annual football match played between the students of the Department of War Studies at King's and the Department of Peace Studies at the University of Bradford since 1995. The rivalry between 'Peace Studies' and 'War Studies' was featured on the Financial Times list of "Great college sports rivalries". The competition is named after War and Peace, the 1869 novel written by the Russian author Leo Tolstoy. The "trophy" is a framed copy of the book. It is kept by the department of the current winners.
