= Oxford Strategic Studies Group =

University of Oxford student society

- Abbreviation: OSSG, OUSSG
- Formation: 1969
- Founder: Sir Michael Eliot Howard
- Headquarters: Oxford
- Website: https://www.oussg.uk/

The Oxford Strategic Studies Group (OSSG) is the oldest student society with a focus on international affairs in Oxford. The main feature of the society's activities is a weekly seminar, given under the Chatham House Rule by practitioners and academics in the area of strategic studies. Recent notable speakers include Ambassador of Finland to the UK HE Jukka Siukosaari, US Defence Attaché in London Captain Gregory Leland, Commander US Naval Forces Europe and Africa Admiral Stuart Munsch, and Emeritus Professor of International Relations Rosemary Foot. These seminars are held in the Old Library in All Souls College, Oxford. OSSG also hosts dinners before the seminars, and termly wargame exercises.

== History ==
OSSG was founded in 1969 under the aegis of military historian Professor Sir Michael Howard OM CH KBE MC. Previous senior members include Professor Adam Roberts, Professor Robert O’Neill, Mr Edward Mortimer, CMG and Professor Sir Michael Howard.

An early example of one of the group's weekly seminars is a talk given by Neville Maxwell on 22 October 1977 called 'The Threat of China'. The group has remained continuously active since it was founded. During COVID-19, the wargames and weekly seminars continued online. The society celebrated its 55th year anniversary with an Anniversary Dinner at All Souls College, attended by previous senior members, alumni and present members. Other notable anniversary celebrations include the group's 40th Anniversary, at which Dr Robert John gave an overview of the main strategic issues of each of the decades of the group's existence. In November 1981, the OSSG held a tripartite seminar at the Royal United Services Institute (RUSI) with Cambridge University War Studies Seminar. A report of this meeting was published in the RUSI Journal.

== Previous presidents ==
=== Presidents 1986-1999 ===
Year	President
1986–87	Michael B. Froman
1987–88	David Fidler
1988–89	Rob Radtke
1989–90	Heidi Avery
1990–91	Holly Wyatt
1991–92	Mats Berdal
1992–93	Tim Benbow
1994–95	Philip Barton
1995–96	Jay Jakub
1996–97	John Nagl
1997–98	Nick Redman
1998–99	Josefine Wallat
1999–00	Carter Malkasian

=== Presidents 2000–2020 ===
Year	President
2000–01	Michael Murphy
2001–02	Alex Baxter
2002–03	Brian Luke Lawrence
2003–04	Samuel Evans
2004–05	Samuel Evans
2005–06	Eric Twerdahl
2006–07	Sheena Chestnut
2007–08	Andrea Baumann
2008–09	Robert Nelson
2009–10	Hila Levy
2010–11	David Blagden
2011–12	Mara Tchalakov
2012–13	Nick Altham
2013–14	George Bogden
2014–15	Josh Brown
2015–16	Mark Mahvi
2016–17	Mark Jbeily
2017–18	Andrew Payne
2018–19	Adam Zibak
2019–20	Leanne Iorio

=== Presidents 2020–Present ===
Year	President
2020–21	Matthew Rogers
2021–22	Ana Radomirescu
2022–23	Emily Berexa
2023–24	Lysander Mawby
2024–25	Yi Hao Wong
2025–Present	Justin Lee
