= Spence (surname) =

Spence is a surname. Notable people with the surname include:

- Anne Spence, American aerospace engineer
- Ara Spence (1793–1866), American jurist from Maryland
- Basil Spence (1907–1976), British architect
- Bradley Spence, British music producer
- Brent Spence (1874–1967), American politician, attorney, and banker
- Bruce Spence (born 1945), New Zealand-born Australian actor
- Catherine Helen Spence (1825–1910), Australian reformer and suffragist
- Charles Spence, English experimental psychologist
- Craig J. Spence (1940–1989), American journalist, lobbyist, and socialite
- Derek Spence (born 1952), Irish footballer
- Djed Spence (born 2000), English footballer
- E. Lee Spence, American author, editor, adventurer and underwater archaeologist
- Errol Spence Jr., American boxer
- Fiona Spence, British-Australian actress
- Floyd Spence, American politician
- George Spence (Canadian politician) (1880–1975), Canadian politician
- George Spence (MP) (1787–1850), British politician
- George Spence (footballer, born 1877) (1877–?), Scottish footballer
- George Spence (footballer, born 1904) (1904–?), English footballer
- Gerry Spence (1929–2025), American trial lawyer
- Jack Spence (disambiguation), several people
- James Spence (surgeon), Scottish Surgeon
- Joe Spence (footballer born 1898), English footballer for Manchester United in the 1920s
- Joe Spence (footballer born 1925), English footballer for York City in the 1950s
- John Brodie Spence, South Australian banker and politician, brother of Catherine
- John S. Spence, American politician from Maryland
- John Selby Spence (Catholic bishop), American Catholic bishop
- John Spence (politician), British politician
- John Spence (musician), founding member of the band No Doubt
- Jonathan Spence, English historian
- Jordan Spence (born 1990), English footballer
- Jordan Spence (ice hockey) (born 2001), Japanese Canadian
- Joseph Spence (author), English anecdotist
- Joseph Spence (musician), Bahamian guitarist and blues musician
- Joy Spence (born 1951), Jamaican master blender
- Julian Spence (1929–1990), American football player
- Kenneth Spence, prominent American psychologist
- Lansford Spence, Jamaican sprinter
- Lewis Spence, journalist and writer
- Linda Spence, Irish-Scottish cricketer
- Louie Spence, British dancer
- Lucas Spence (born 2003), American baseball player
- Malcolm Spence (ice hockey) (born 2006), Canadian ice hockey player
- Michael Spence, American economist
- Mitch Spence (born 1998), American baseball player
- Nicky Spence, Scottish opera singer
- Noah Spence, American football player
- Peter Spence (actor), Canadian film and television actor
- Phil Spence, American basketball player and coach
- Robert Spence (chemist) (1905–1976), British nuclear chemist and former director of the AERE
- Russell Spence, English race car driver
- Ruth Elizabeth Spence (1890-1982), Canadian teacher and historian
- Sam Spence (1927–2016), American composer and musician
- Shaun Spence (born 1991), Australian rugby player
- Sion Spence (born 2000), Welsh footballer
- Skip Spence (1946–1999), American rock musician
- Steve Spence, American long-distance runner
- Thomas Spence (1750–1814), English Radical democrat
- Terry R. Spence, American politician
- Toby Spence (born 1969), English tenor
- Vivienne Spence, Jamaican track and field athlete
- William Spence (1846–1926), Australian trade unionist and politician
- William Wallace Spence (1815–1915), American financier
- Willie Spence (1999–2022), American singer
- Wishart Spence, Canadian jurist
