= Ahron Bregman =

Former IDF member, Israeli political scientist

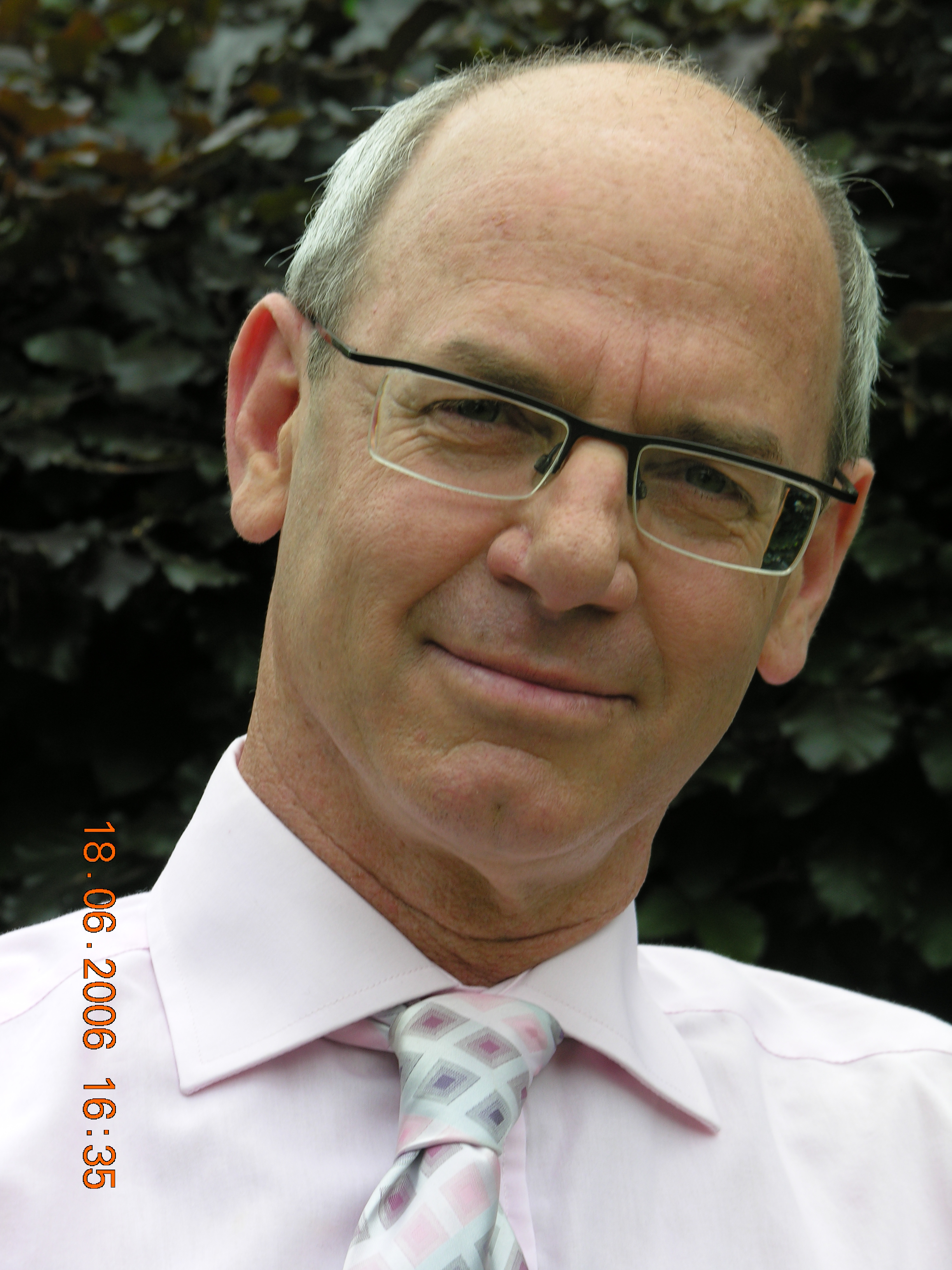
Bregman in 2006

Ahron "Ronnie" Bregman (Hebrew: אהרון ברגמן; born 1958) is a UK-based political scientist of Israeli origin, as well as a writer and journalist, specialising on the Arab–Israeli conflict.

== Biography ==
Bregman was born and raised in Israel. He served in the Israel Defense Forces and as an artillery officer participated in the 1978 Litani campaign and the 1982 Lebanon War. After the war, he left the army to study international relations and political science at the Hebrew University of Jerusalem. He also worked as a parliamentary assistant in the Knesset. After giving an interview in 1988 to the Haaretz newspaper declaring that he would refuse to serve as a military reservist in the Israeli-occupied territories, he left Israel and settled in England. There he joined the Department of War Studies, King's College London, and completed his PhD in 1994. Bregman is the writer of several books and articles on the Arab–Israeli conflict and Middle Eastern Affairs. Since 1994 he has been The Daily Telegraph's writer of obituaries, covering the Jewish world and Israel. A senior teaching fellow at the Department of War Studies and a journalist, Bregman lives in London. He has three children.

== Marwan affair ==
In 2002, Bregman claimed that the Egyptian Ashraf Marwan, the son-in-law of President Gamal Abdel Nasser, was a Mossad spy. According to Bregman, Marwan volunteered for the Mossad in 1970 but then proceeded to mislead the Israelis before the 1973 Yom Kippur War. Although Marwan insisted that Bregman's claim was "a stupid detective story", they became friends and Marwan made Bregman a consultant on his memoirs. On 27 June 2007, the day that Bregman and Marwan were due to meet up in central London, Marwan's body was discovered in a small rose garden, just under the balcony of his London flat. A police investigation failed to establish whether Marwan was pushed, jumped, or fell by accident. In 2016, Bregman published a book titled The Spy Who Fell to Earth on his relationship with Marwan. In December 2017, Salon Pictures purchased the rights to turn it into a feature documentary.

The Bregman Collection, which includes papers and tapes related to the Marwan Affair, is kept at the Liddell Hart Archives, King's College London. A documentary about Ashraf Marwan and Bregman's work, The Spy Who Fell to Earth, came out on Netflix in April 2019.

== Productions ==
Bregman is the author of several books, as well as being associate producer/consultant of two major television series.

=== Books ===
- The Spy Who Fell to Earth: My Relationship with the Secret Agent Who Rocked the Middle East
- Living and Working in Israel
- Israel's Wars: A History since 1947
- Israel and the Arabs: An Eyewitness Account of War and Peace in the Middle East
- The Fifty Years War: Israel and the Arabs (co-authored with Jihan El-Tahri, accompanying the below series)
- Israël et les Arabes: la guerre de cinquante ans (French)
- Israël en de Arabieren: De vijftigjarige oorlog (Dutch)
- اسرائيل والعرب : حرب الخمسين عاما (Arabic)
- 以色列史 (Chinese)
- Israel's Wars: 1947–93
- A History of Israel
- Elusive Peace: How the Holy Land Defeated America (accompanying the below series)
- Warfare in the Middle East since 1945 (editor)
- Cursed Victory: A History of Israel and the Occupied Territories

=== Television ===
He was also an associate producer and academic consultant on two BBC television series:

- Israel and the Arabs: The Fifty Years War
- Israel and the Arabs: Elusive Peace
