= Christopher Coker =

British political scientist and political philosopher (1953–2023)

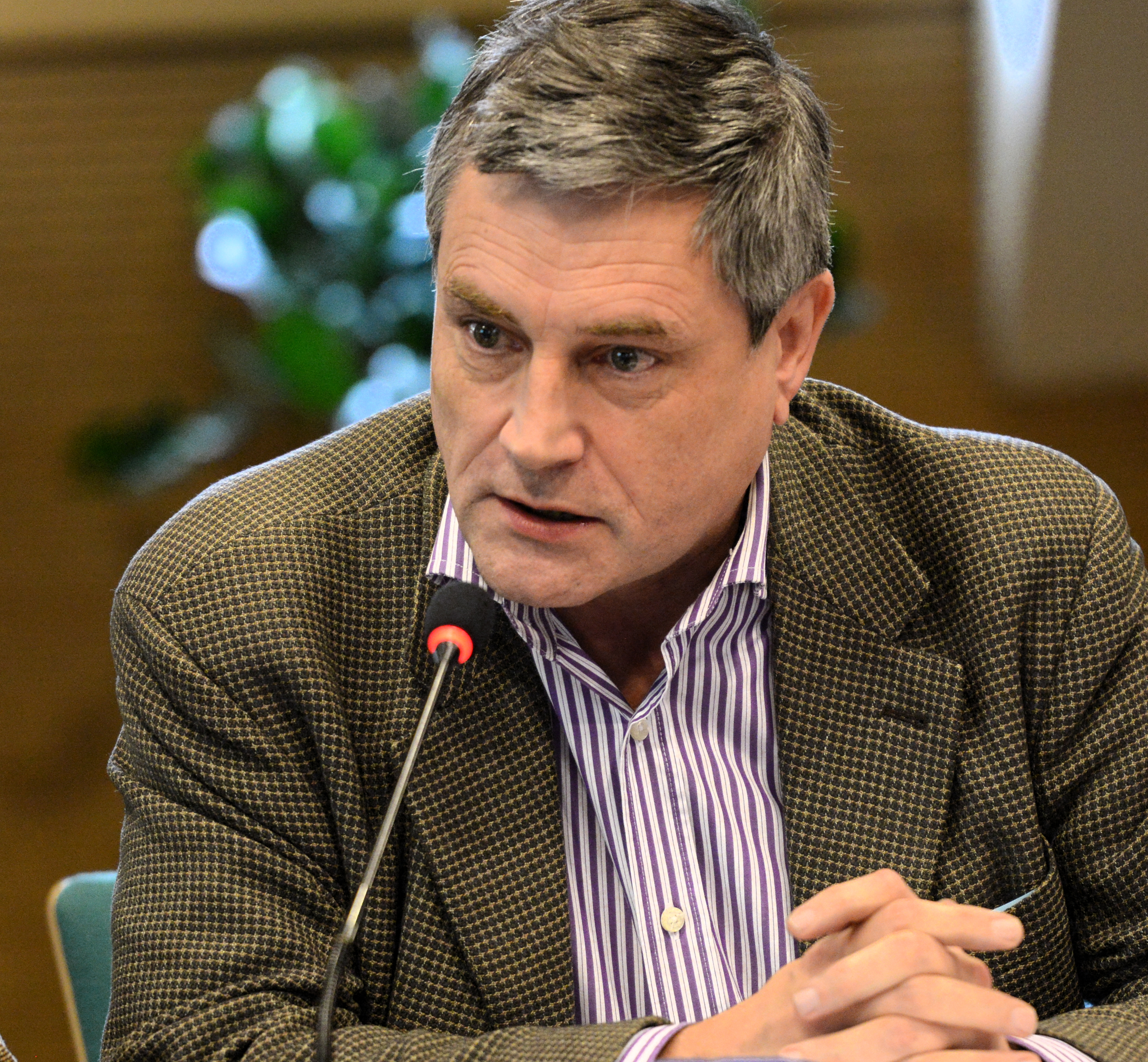
- Coker in 2014
- Born: 28 March 1953
- Died: 5 September 2023 (aged 70)

Academic work
- Institutions: London School of Economics
- Main interests: War

Christopher Coker (28 March 1953 – 5 September 2023) was a British political scientist and political philosopher who wrote extensively on war. He was Professor of International Relations at the London School of Economics (LSE) for almost 40 years, from 1982 until 2019. Despite being retired from his professorship, Coker was Director of LSE IDEAS, LSE's foreign policy think tank and continued to be a regular participant or consultant in UK and NATO military education and strategic planning circles. He was also the Director of the Rațiu Forum in Romania. He was a NATO Fellow in 1981. He was a member of Council of the Royal United Services Institute (RUSI).

Coker died on 5 September 2023, at the age of 70. Studying in Oxford and Cambridge, his supervisor was Sir Michael Howard. Other influences on him were Hedley Bull and Philip Windsor. Obituaries highlighted Christopher Coker's commitment to mentoring students.

== Scholarship ==
Coker believed that war is a feature of ‘human nature’ or ‘humanity’ in general. In the 2021 book Why War?, Coker argued that war is central to the human condition and is part of the evolutionary inheritance which has allowed humans to survive and thrive. New technologies such as Artificial Intelligence (AI), and new geopolitical battles may transform the face and purpose of war in the 21st century, but humans' capacity for war remains undiminished. Coker concluded that humanity will not see the end of war until it exhausts its own evolutionary possibilities.

In his 2019 book The Rise of the Civilizational State, Coker investigates how Xi Jinping’s China and Vladimir Putin’s Russia seek to challenge Western powers and liberal international order with concepts of civilizational states.

In July 2023, Christopher Coker wrote a reflection on the state of war studies, which can be read as a summary of his key views on the state of war, after the invasion of Ukraine. In this short essay that also references other major literature on the subject, Coker argues that "Our relationship with war is so long and deep that we could, if we wish, tell the story of humanity entirely through the lens of conflict."

The annual Christopher Coker Prize recognizes the best paper in strategic studies published in the journal International Politics in the previous year.

== Works ==
=== Monographs ===
- Why War? (Oxford University Press, 2021)
- The Rise of the Civilizational State (Polity, 2019)
- Rebooting Clausewitz: 'On War' in the Twenty-First Century (Oxford University Press, 2017)
- The Improbable War: China, the United States and the Continuing Logic of Great Power Conflict (Oxford University Press, 2014)
- Can War be Eliminated? (Polity, 2014)
- Globalisation and Insecurity in the Twenty-First Century: NATO and the Management of Risk (Routledge, 2014)
- Men at War: What Fiction Tells Us about Conflict, from the Lliad to Catch-22 (Oxford University Press, 2014)
- Warrior Geeks: How 21st-century Technology is Changing the Way We Fight and Think about War (Oxford University Press, 2013)
- War in an Age of Risk (Polity, 2013)
- Barbarous Philosophers: Reflections on the Nature of War from Heraclitus to Heisenberg (Columbia University Press, 2010)
- Ethics and War in the 21st Century (Routledge, 2008)
- The Warrior Ethos: Military Culture and the War on Terror (Routledge, 2007)
- The Future War: The Re-Enchantment of War in the Twenty-First Century (Wiley-Blackwell, 2004)
- Empires in Conflict: The Growing Rift between Europe and the United States (Royal United Services Institute for Defence and Security Studies, 2003)
- Waging War Without Warriors? The Changing Culture of Military Conflict (Lynne Rienner Publishers, 2002)
- Humane Warfare: The New Ethics of Postmodern War (Routledge, 2001)
- Twilight of The West (Basic Books, 1998)
- War And The Illiberal Conscience (Avalon Publishing, 1998)
- War and the 20th Century: A Study of War and Modern Consciousness (Brassey's, 1994)
- A Farewell to Arms Control: The Irrelevance of CFE (Alliance Publishers Limited, 1991)
- Reflections on American Foreign Policy Since 1945 (Pinter, 1989)
- British Defence Policy in the 1990s: A Guide to the Defence Debate (Potomac Books, 1987)
- South Africa's Security Dilemmas (Praeger, 1987)
- NATO, the Warsaw Pact and Africa (Palgrave Macmillan, 1985)
- The Soviet Union, Eastern Europe, and the New International Economic Order (Praeger, 1984)
- The Future of the Atlantic Alliance (Palgrave Macmillan, 1984)
- US Military Power in the 1980s (Palgrave Macmillan, 1983)

=== Articles ===
- Still ‘The Human Thing’? Technology, Human Agency and the Future of War. International Relations 32.1 (2018): 23-38.
- On Humanising War. Totalitarian Movements and Political Religions 1.2 (2000): 77-92.

=== Book chapters ===
- The Collision of Modern and Post-Modern War. In Yves Boyer & Julian Lindley-French (eds.) The Oxford Handbook of War (2012).
- Rebooting the West: Can the Western Alliance Still Engage in War? In Christopher Browning & Marko Lehti (eds.) The Struggle for the West (Routledge, 2009).
- NATO as a Post Modern Alliance. In Sabrina Petra Ramet & Christine Ingebritsen (eds.) Coming in From the Cold War: Us-European Interactions Since 1980. (Rowman & Littlefield, 2002)
- Outsourcing War. In Daphné Josselin & William Wallace (eds.) Non-State Actors in World Politics (Palgrave Macmillan, 2001).

=== Interviews, podcasts and video lectures ===
- History Lessons — Christopher Coker explains Why War? Engelsberg Ideas Podcast, 2022
- Why War? LSE IDEAS Online Public Event (video), May 2021
- Keynote: Christopher Coker, "The Civilizational State and the Crisis of World Order" (video), Telos-Paul Piccone Institute Conference, April 2021
- Podcast about Christopher Coker's book The Rise of the Civilizational State (Polity Press, 2019)
- LSE IQ Episode 28 | Is the 21st Century the Chinese century?, October 2019
- Will War still need us? What Future for Agency in War? Oxford University Podcasts, November 2019
- Christopher Coker on the Idea of the West, Telos, October 2014
- Men at War: What Fiction Tells Us About War, Oxford University Podcasts, October 2013
