= Robert Spence =

Robert Spence may refer to:

- Robert Spence (bishop) (1860–1934), Archbishop of Adelaide
- Robert Spence (chemist) (1905–1976), British chemist
- Robert Spence (British politician) (1879–1966), MP for Berwick and Haddington
- Robert Spence (Canadian politician) (1811–1868), political figure in Canada West
- Robert Spence (engineer) (born 1933), British engineer and information visualization expert
- Bob Spence (born 1946), former Major League Baseball player
- Rob Spence (American football) (born 1958), American football coach

== See also ==
- William Robert Spence (1875–1954), Scottish trade union leader
- Spence (surname)
