= N. A. Barber =

British Army officer

Lieutenant-Colonel N. A. Barber, MBE, TD (1906–1994) was a British Army officer who served in Singapore during the Second World War and was captured by the Japanese. His diary of his time as a prisoner of war in Changi Camp is held by the Liddell Hart Centre for Military Archives, King's College London.

== Career ==
Barber was an officer of the British Army's Royal Army Service Corps during the Second World War being posted to the 18th division, Singapore, in 1941. He was captured by the Japanese following the fall of Singapore in 1942. His diary of his time as a prisoner of war in Changi Camp, August 1942 to September 1945, is held in the Liddell Hart Centre for Military Archives, King's College London. It contains detailed information about conditions in the camp, including diet, casualties, disease and nominal rolls of prisoners.

Barber was awarded the Territorial Decoration, upgraded to two clasps in 1951, and appointed a member of the Order of the British Empire.
