= Christopher Dandeker =

British military sociologist

Christopher Dandeker is a British sociologist recognized for his contributions to the field of military sociology. Dandeker was a professor of Military Sociology in the Department of War Studies, King's College London, and is known for his leadership in the Department of War Studies.

== Career ==
Christopher Dandeker received his BSc and PhD degrees in Sociology from the University of Leicester. Dandeker began his academic career in 1974 as a lecturer of sociology at the University of Leicester, where he would be a lecturer for over 15 years. In 1990, Dandeker joined the faculty of the Department of War Studies at King's College London to teach military sociology, where he would make significant strides in improving their undergraduate program.

In 1997, he took over as the head of the Department of War Studies, before serving as the head of the School of Social Sciences and Public Policy from 2005-2008. Dandeker retired from King's College London in July 2015 as an emeritus professor.

During his time at King's College, he co-founded and became co-Director of the King's Centre for Military Health Research and served as an independent member of the UK's Defense Science Advisory Council.

== Research and Impact ==
Dandeker's research spans topics such as military health and well-being, recruitment, retention, and resettlement of military personnel, and civil-military relations. He also led a research initiative on public perceptions of the UK armed forces regarding their involvement in conflicts in Iraq and Afghanistan.

Additionally, he advised the British Army, the House of Commons Defense Committee, and the Swedish Defense Forces on military personnel issues. Dandeker is an editorial board member of the journal Armed Forces & Society, a fellow of the Inter-University Seminar on Armed Forces and Society [IUS], and a member of its Council.

In 2011, Dandeker received the Morris Janowitz Career Achievement Award from the Inter-University Seminar on Armed Forces and Society [IUS]. The award is given to a select few senior scholars who "demonstrate excellence in the study of armed forces and society and important service to the discipline".

== Notable Publications ==
- Johnson, Terry; Dandeker, Christopher; Ashworth, Clive (1984). The Structure of Social Theory: Dilemmas, Strategies, and Projects. St. Martin's Press. ISBN 9780312768331.
- Dandeker, Christopher (1990). Surveillance Power and Modernity: Bureaucracy and Discipline from 1700 to the Present Day. Polity Press. ISBN 9780745613420.
- Dandeker, Christopher, ed. (1998). Nationalism and Violence. Transaction Publishers. ISBN 9781560003397.
- Boene, Bernard; Dandeker, Christopher, eds. (1998). Les armées en Europe. La Découverte. ISBN 9782707128607.
- Kümmel, Gerhard; Caforio, Giuseppe, eds. (2009). Armed Forces, Soldiers and Civil-Military Relations: Essays in Honor of Jürgen Kuhlmann. VS Verlag für Sozialwissenschaften. ISBN 9783531163246.
