= Felix Berenskötter =

German political scientist

- Born: July 1975 (age 51); Germany
- Known for: Editor of Millennium: Journal of International Studies(2004-2006)

Academic background
- Education: University of Hamburg; Rutgers University; London School of Economics and Political Science
- Thesis: From Friends to Strangers: A Theory of Interstate Security Cooperation Applied to German-American Relations, 1945-1995 (2008)
- Doctoral advisor: Michael Cox

Academic work
- Discipline: Political science
- Sub-discipline: International relations
- School or tradition: Constructivism; Antipositivism
- Institutions: Department of War Studies, King's College London since 2024; SOAS University of London 2009-2024
- Notable ideas: Friendship and identity in international relations

Head of Department of Politics and International Studies, SOAS University of London
- In office July 2019 – January 2023
- Succeeded by: Matthew J. Nelson

Felix Sebastian Berenskötter (born July 1975) is a German political scientist who specializes in international relations theory, interpretivist approaches, concept analysis, European security, and transatlantic relations. He is a Reader in International Relations at the Department of War Studies, King's College London. Berenskötter serves on the editorial board of the Journal of Global Security Studies and co-edits the book series Bristol Studies in International Theory.

== Biography ==
Following undergraduate studies in University of Hamburg (1997-2000), Berenskötter received a master's degree from Rutgers University (2000-2002), where he was a Fulbright Scholar, and a PhD from the London School of Economics and Political Science (LSE) in 2008, where he was an editor of the journal Millennium: Journal of International Studies (2004-2006).

Before joining King's College London in 2024, Berenskötter was based at SOAS University of London, Department of Politics and International Studies (2009-2024) where he also served Head of Department from July 2019 to January 2023. He was a Research Fellow at the John Sloan Dickey Center for International Understanding, Dartmouth College (2007-2008) and a Visiting Fellow at the American German Institute (AGI, formerly Institute for Contemporary German Studies), Johns Hopkins University in 2019. Berenskötter was a founding associate editor of the Journal of Global Security Studies (2014–19) and co-convened the 'Interpretivism in International Relations' Working Group of the British International Studies Association (BISA). He is founder and former chair of the ‘Theory Section’ of the International Studies Association (ISA), and a former member of the Governing Board of the European International Studies Association (EISA).

== Publications ==
- Concepts in World Politics (2016, Sage)
- Power in World Politics, with Michael J. Williams (2007, Routledge)
