= Eric Grove =

British naval historian and defence analyst (1948–2021)

- Born: Eric John Grove; 3 December 1948; Farnworth, Lancashire, England
- Died: 15 April 2021 (aged 72); Bispham, Lancashire, England
- Education: King's College London (MA)
- Occupations: Naval historian; defence analyst
- Spouses: Elizabeth Stocks (m. 1973; div. 2005); Sarian Higginbotham (m. 2005; died 2016); Swee Poh Kanagasabay (m. 2017)

Eric John Grove (3 December 1948 – 15 April 2021) was a British naval historian and defence analyst.

== Biography ==
Eric John Grove was born in Farnworth, Lancashire, on 3 December 1948. When he was twelve, his family moved to Aberdeen, where his father worked as a doctor. Grove took an MA in War Studies at King's College London in 1971.

== Career ==
In 1971, Grove was appointed a civilian lecturer in Naval History and Strategic Studies at the Britannia Royal Naval College Dartmouth and continued in that position till 1984. During the 1970s he wrote books on tanks and armoured warfare. In 1980 and 1981 Grove was the first Dartmouth academic to exchange for a year with the United States Naval Academy.

Leaving Dartmouth as Deputy Head of Strategic Studies and International Affairs at the end of 1984 Grove worked for a year for the Council for Arms Control before becoming a freelance academic and defence consultant, although he is still remembered lecturing at BRNC Dartmouth in 1985-6. His principal work was with the Foundation for International Security's Common Security Programme followed by its project on Maritime Power and European Security which involved the creation of a back channel, later official, dialogue between the Soviet, US and Royal Navies. He also taught at the Royal Naval College, Greenwich and the University of Cambridge.

In 1993 Grove accepted a position with the Department of Politics at the University of Hull and its Centre for Security Studies. He obtained a PhD on the basis of his published works in 1996. He eventually left in 2005 as Reader in Politics and International Studies and Director of the centre, having founded a new undergraduate course in War and Security Studies. During this time he also acted as consultant and co author for the first edition of the Royal Navy's The Fundamentals of British Maritime Doctrine (BR1806). He was also involved in the first iteration of British Defence Doctrine. In 1997, Dr Grove was a visiting fellow at the Centre for Maritime Policy at the University of Wollongong, New South Wales.

In 2005, Grove moved to the University of Salford where he was Professor of Naval History and Director of the Centre for International Security and War Studies. In 2013-15 he was Professor of Naval History and Senior Fellow in the Centre for Applied Research in Security Innovation at Hope University in Liverpool.

His works include Vanguard to Trident: British Naval Policy Since 1945 (1987), The Future of Sea Power (1990), The Price of Disobedience (2000) and The Royal Navy Since 1815 (2005). He also edited a new edition of Sir Julian Corbett's Some Principles of Maritime Strategy in 1988.

Grove made contributions to many television programmes including BBC2's Timewatch series, Deep Wreck Mysteries, Channel 4's Hunt for the Hood and the Bismarck and the series The Battleships and the Airships. Grove also featured regularly on the National Geographic show Drain the Oceans.

Grove was a Fellow of the Royal Historical Society, a Vice President of the Society for Nautical Research and a Member of Council of the Navy Records Society (for which he edited the Naval Staff History, The Defeat of the Enemy Attack Upon Shipping, published in 1997).

Professor Grove began contributing to Britain at War magazine in 2015.

== Personal life ==
He was first married to Elizabeth Stocks in 1973. The marriage was dissolved in 2005, in which year Grove married opera singer Sarian Higginbotham, known professionally as Sarian Grevelle. She died in 2016. In 2017 he married Swee Poh Kanagasabay, a nurse.

Grove died from hypertensive heart disease at his home in Bispham, Blackpool on 15 April 2021, at the age of 72.
