= Philip Windsor =

British academic

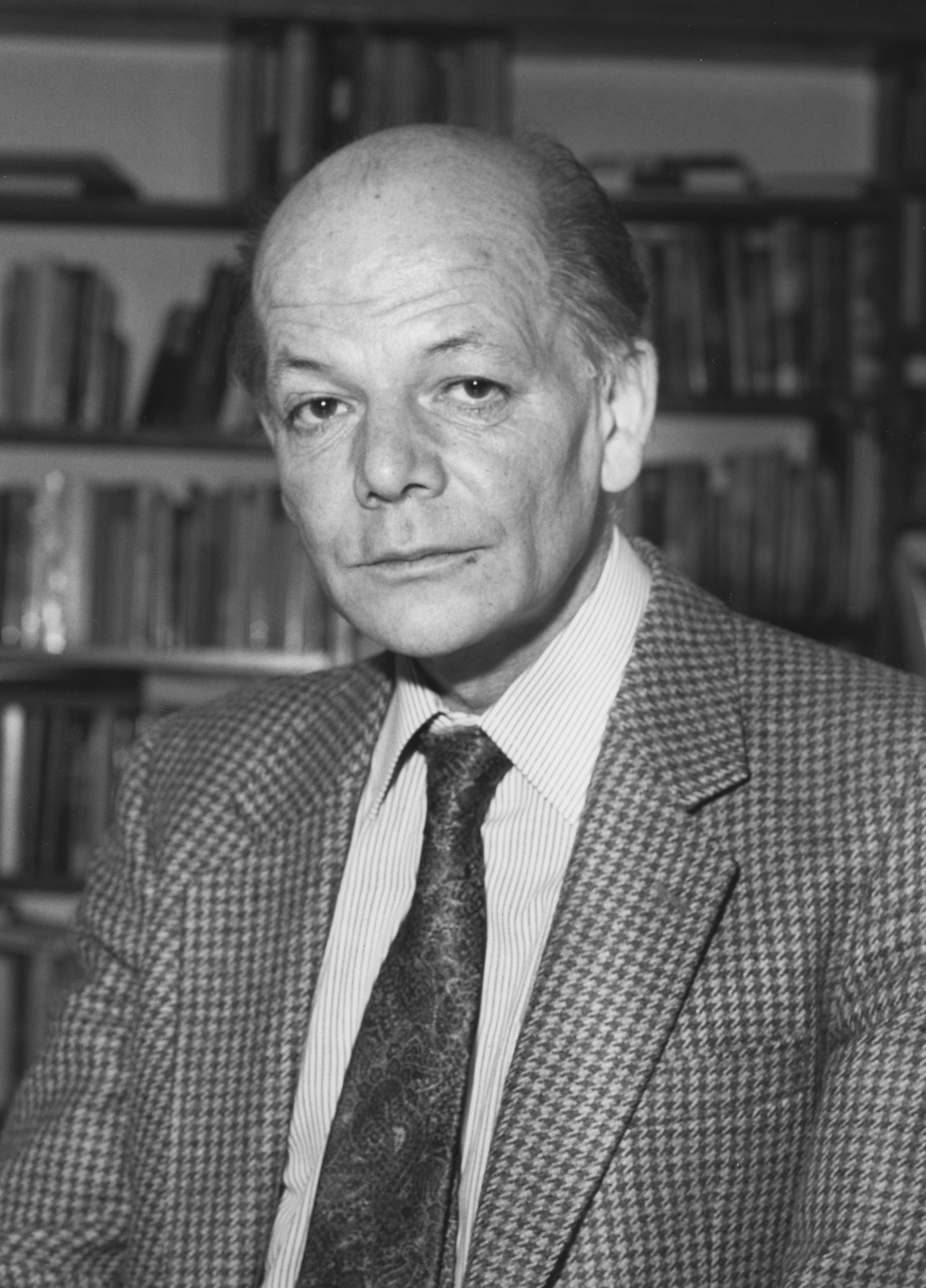
Phillip Windsor, c. 1980s

Philip Windsor was a British academic teaching International Relations mostly at the London School of Economics. He was born in India in 1935, studied at Merton College, and taught at the LSE from 1965. At LSE, he was known and valued for his distinctive lecturing style, and for engaging with students and colleagues outside formal teaching settings. For years, he taught "Strategic Aspects of International Relations", a flagship course in the International Relations department. He was a major influence on various thinkers, including Christopher Coker.

He authored a range of articles on Germany, German reunification and on strategic studies. Philip Windsor died in June 2000.

The LSE's International Relations Department has named its prize for the best Master's dissertation after Philip Windsor.

== Selected publications ==
- Windsor, Philip (2002) Strategic thinking: an introduction and farewell. Lynne Rienner Publishers, Boulder, CO. ISBN 9781902210902 (edited by Mats Berdal and Spiros Economides)
- Nobutoshi Hagihara, Akira Iriye, Georges Nivat, and Philip Windsor (eds.), Experiencing the Twentieth Century (Tokyo: University of Tokyo Press, 1985, ISBN 9784130270229
- Windsor, Philip (1962) The Berlin Crises, History Today, Volume 12, Issue 6, June 1962
- Alastair Buchan and Philip Windsor, Arms and Stability in Europe; a Report; New York, Praeger, For The Institute For Strategic Studies, London; First edition. (January 1, 1963)
