= David Betz =

Canadian war studies academic

- Occupations: Professor, academic
- Years active: 2002-present

David J. Betz is a Canadian professor and researcher in the field of war studies. Betz is professor of war in the modern world at the Department of War Studies, King's College London, having joined the department in 2002. He is also a senior fellow at the Foreign Policy Research Institute.

== Education and career ==
Betz received a BA degree and an MA from Carleton University (Ottawa, Canada), and a PhD degree from the University of Glasgow in 2002.

During his tenure at King’s College London, Betz has published extensively on warfare, counterinsurgency, and cybersecurity. In 2011, Betz argued that concerns about cyberwarfare had close relation to the alarmism found in military circles over aviation a century earlier in Cyberwar Is Not Coming. In Carnage and Connectivity (2015), Betz analysed the impact of global connectivity on military power. In 2017, he co-authored Putting the Strategy Back into Strategic Communications, advocating for a more robust strategic foundation in communications theory.

Betz also addressed the application of ethics and morals in modern battlefield contexts in War, ‘Moral Forces’, and the ‘Virus of Strategism’ (2014).

== Influence ==
Betz' 2024 book The Guarded Age: Fortification in the 21st Century has been reviewed for the US Naval Institute, with reviewer Lieutenant Colonel Dillon Fishman describing it as "a trenchant social commentary that speaks to an audience broader than specialists".

Betz has since found a wider public audience with the publication of Civil War Comes to the West in Military Magazine in 2022, which relied on comparative analyses, drew on the work of other experts in his field, and applied these insights to Europe and North America in an age of growing racial and political polarisation. He was particularly inspired by the work of How Civil Wars Start: And How to Stop Them by Rohr Professor of International Relations Barbara F. Walter. This has since been followed by another entry to the two-part series. Betz featured on several widely viewed British podcasts in 2025 and 2026, including Triggernometry and Maiden Mother Matriarch, discussing the risk of civil war in the UK based on his article Civil War Comes to the West.

== Reactions ==
The conservative commentator Rod Dreher, writing in The European Conservative, commended Betz' work: "What makes his warnings especially chilling is that he delivers them calmly, driven by data and logical analysis. He is the furthest thing from a wild‑eyed apocalypticist shouting on a street corner." Ben Quinn of The Guardian referenced Betz in a 2026 article, arguing his predictions of civil war were no longer confined to a small minority and noted that 33% of Britons polled by YouGov in a 2024 survey believed that a civil war was somewhat or very likely in the next decade.

Betz's work has also been criticised. John Merrick described Betz' output as being in the "porous space between the extreme right and its more mainstream variants", helping to give an "air of respectability" to ideas like race war, "that would until recently have been considered beyond the pale". Similarly, writing in the New Statesman Phil Tinline negatively compared Betz's predictions to "the fear Enoch Powell stoked in April 1968 in his “rivers of blood” speech."
