= Nawaf Obaid =

Saudi Arabian political scientist

- نواف عبید
- Born: Nawaf Essam Ahmad Obaid
- Education: Georgetown University Harvard University; Massachusetts Institute of Technology University of London (King's College)
- Known for: Diplomat, columnist, academic, philanthropist

Nawaf Essam Ahmad Obaid (Arabic: نواف عصام احمد عبید) is a Saudi Arabian political scientist, and a former foreign policy and media advisor. He currently serves as the CEO of the Essam & Dalal OBAID Foundation (EDOF) in Geneva, a Commissioner at the Commission for International Justice and Accountability (CIJA) in The Hague, and a Visiting Senior Research Fellow at the Department of War Studies at King's College London.

== Background ==
Nawaf Obaid's family originate from Yanbu Al-Nakhal in the Medina Province (Saudi Arabia). They are distant cousins to the Moroccan royal family.

He is a grandson of Sayyid Ahmad Mohammed Obaid (born 1912), one of Saudi Arabia's leading technocrats and media publishers under the Kingdom's founding monarch, King Abdulaziz. After the establishment of the Saudi Kingdom in 1932, King Abdulaziz named Sayyid Ahmad Obaid to various positions as the central authority of the emerging Saudi state began to expand over all the conquered territories of the founding monarch.

Sayyid Ahmad Obaid was initially named as the communications battlefield coordinator in King Abdulaziz military campaign in the Saudi-Yemeni War that culminated in the Treaty of Taif (1934) that officially incorporated Jizan, Asir, and Najran into modern Saudi Arabia. He was then named as a senior inspector in the Ministry of Finance directly reporting to King Abdulaziz's finance minister, Abdullah bin Suleiman Al Hamdan, and dispatched to the northern and southern border regions of the Kingdom to establish customs offices at the new Saudi entry points with Yemen, Kuwait, and Iraq. He was subsequently named as the Saudi financial & customs attaché to pre-independence Kuwait (before formal diplomatic ties were established), then director general of the Finance Ministry, and when the first Saudi Council of Ministers was formed in 1953, he was named the deputy minister in the newly formed Agriculture Ministry to its first minister, former Crown Prince Sultan bin Abdulaziz Al Saud. After more than twenty years in public service, he retired in 1955.

Sayyid Ahmad Obaid is widely credited for introducing the modern printing press into the Kingdom in 1955 by launching Al Riyadh Magazine.

Nawaf Obaid's eldest uncle, Taher Ahmad Obaid, served as the deputy agriculture minister during the time of King Faisal bin Abdulaziz Al Saud. And his other uncle, Dr. Ibrahim Ahmad Obaid, served as the deputy Post, Telephone & Telegraph (PTT) minister during the time of King Fahd bin Abdulaziz Al Saud.

He is also a nephew of Dr. Thoraya Obaid, the former United Nations Undersecretary for Population Affairs and former executive director of United Nations Population Fund (UNFPA).

== Education ==
- IB – Humanities; International School of Geneva, 1982–1993.
- BS – International Relations; Edmund A. Walsh School of Foreign Service at Georgetown University, 1994–1996.
- MPP – International Security & Political Economy; John F. Kennedy School of Government at Harvard University, 1996–1998.
- PhD – Political Science (Security Studies) at MIT Center for International Studies; Department of Political Science at Massachusetts Institute of Technology, 2000–2001 (coursework completed).
- MA – War Studies; Department of War Studies at King's College London, 2010–2011.
- PhD – War Studies; Department of War Studies at King's College London, 2011–2013.

During Obaid's time at Harvard Kennedy School, he studied under American international relations theorists Graham Allison and Joseph Nye. Professor Nye served as the academic mentor and supervisor to Obaid while he wrote a controversial master's thesis on US-Saudi relations. Although Obaid was a student of Professor Nye, he subscribes to the neorealism school of thought in international relations theory and has been heavily influenced by eminent theorists Kenneth Waltz of Columbia University, Samuel P. Huntington of Harvard University, and Barry Posen and Stephen Van Evera of MIT.

== Career ==
=== Public career ===
Obaid started his public career in February 2003 by being named, alongside murdered Saudi journalist Jamal Khashoggi, as a Special Advisor for Strategic Communications to the Saudi Ambassador to the UK and then to the US. Based between London and Washington DC, he held the position until December 2006. Obaid is widely considered to having been an intimate friend of Khashoggi after working closely together for over fifteen years. They had a significant falling out several months before the assassination of Jamal Khashoggi in Istanbul because, according to former French intelligence officials, Obaid discovered that Khashoggi was involved in several covert political initiatives to attempt to undermine Saudi domestic security.

In December 2006, Obaid was fired from the staff of Prince Turki Al Faisal, then Saudi Ambassador to the United States, for publishing an opinion piece in The Washington Post "contending that 'one of the first consequences' of an American pullout of Iraq would 'be massive Saudi intervention to stop Iranian-backed Shiite militias from butchering Iraqi Sunnis.'" The article also suggested that the Kingdom could cut oil prices in half, which "would be devastating to Iran." While the Saudi government disavowed the piece and Prince Turki Al Faisal cancelled his contract as a result, "Arab diplomats said...that Mr. Obaid's column reflected the view of the Saudi government, which has made clear its opposition to an American pullout from Iraq."

Then, in February 2007, he became a Special Advisor to the President of Citizens Affairs at the Saudi Royal Court, based between Riyadh and Jeddah. Leaving that position in January 2011, he shortly thereafter became the Counselor for Foreign Media Affairs to the Abdulaziz bin Mohieddin Khoja, then Saudi Minister of Culture and Information in Riyadh. In May 2011 he became the Counselor to Prince Mohammed bin Nawwaf Al Saud, then Saudi Ambassador to the United Kingdom. He held this position until January 2016.

From September 2014 up to the present, Obaid has also served as CEO of the Essam and Dalal Obaid Foundation (EDOF), based in Geneva, Switzerland. EDOF was founded by Obaid and his two brothers to honour the humanitarian legacy of their parents. EDOF supports organizations that are doing important work in the fields of medical research and social progress in order to help them fulfill their already proven track record of success. Some of the projects that EDOF has supported include initiatives with the Mayo Clinic, the CNN Freedom Project, and the International Committee of the Red Cross, among others. EDOF also funded the creation of the Essam and Dalal Obaid Center for Reconstructive Transplant Surgery at the Mayo Clinic in Rochester, Minnesota.

Since April 2018, Obaid has been a Commissioner at the Commission for International Justice & Accountability (CIJA). CIJA is a non-profit, non-governmental organisation dedicated to conducting criminal investigations during armed conflict and analysing evidence of genocide, war crimes, and crimes against humanity. CIJA is apolitical and carries out its investigative activities independently from any government. Through its work CIJA provides support for local police forces, war crimes and counterterrorism investigations, and countering violent extremism (CVE) programmes.

CIJA has been especially implicated in the Syrian civil war. Since 2012, CIJA Investigators have smuggled more than a million government documents out of Syria, many of them from top secret intelligence facilities. "The documents are brought to the group's headquarters, in a nondescript office building in Western Europe, sometimes under diplomatic cover. There, each page is scanned, assigned a bar code and a number, and stored underground. A dehumidifier hums inside the evidence room; just outside, a small box dispenses rat poison".

The so-called "Assad Files" have allowed CIJA investigators and criminal lawyers to capture top secret intelligence and security reports and tie the Syrian regime to mass torture and killings, and crimes against humanity.

For the past several years, CIJA has been at the receiving end of a massive covert Russian disinformation campaign to discredit it. In 2021, the BBC revealed that CIJA operatives had unraveled a network of Russian informants within Britain's elite institutions of higher education. These academics, masquerading as members of the so-called "Syria Working Group" are aiding Russia's main intelligence services to wage a war of false news and alternative facts using conspiracy theories to justify their support for the Assad regime in Syria. As the BBC reported, "A British professor corresponded for months with a man called only "Ivan", seeking assistance to discredit an organisation [CIJA] that helps bring Syrian war criminals to justice. He also asked "Ivan" to investigate other British academics and journalists. The email exchange, seen by the BBC, reveals how, a decade on from the start of the Syrian conflict, a battle is still being waged in the field of information and misinformation."

=== Academic career ===
- June 2020 – Present | Visiting Senior Research Fellow at the Department of War Studies, King's College London.
- April 2017 – August 2018 | Inaugural Visiting Fellow for Intelligence and Defense Projects at Harvard University's Belfer Center for Science and International Affairs.
- March 2017 | Co-founded the Saudi & GCC Security Project at Harvard University's Belfer Center for Science and International Affairs.
- September 2012 – April 2017 | Visiting Fellow and Adjunct Lecturer at Harvard University's Belfer Center for Science and International Affairs.
- January 2008 – January 2016 | Senior Fellow at the King Faisal Center for Research and Islamic Studies, the think tank of the King Faisal Foundation in Riyadh.
- May 2004 – January 2007 | Adjunct Fellow for the Arleigh A. Burke Chair in Strategy at the Center for Strategic and International Studies (CSIS) in Washington DC.
- January 1999 – January 2000 | Research Fellow at The Washington Institute for Near East Policy (WINEP) in Washington DC.

=== Past Honoured Academic Appointments ===
- May 2015 – May 2017 | Distinguished International Affairs Fellow at National Council on U.S.-Arab Relations (NCUSAR) in Washington, DC.
- September 2014 – June 2017 | Senior Visiting Lecturer at Stirling University's Division of History & Politics in Stirling, Scotland.

== Selected publications ==
- A Long Pattern of Brazen Assassinations. Susris. 9 December 2011.
- A New Generation of Saudi Leaders, and a New Foreign Policy. The Washington Post. 26 March 2015.
- A Saudi Arabian Defense Doctrine. Belfer Center for Science and International Affairs, Harvard Kennedy School. 27 May 2014.
- A Saudi View on the Islamic State. With Saudi Al Sarhan. European Council on Foreign Relations. 2 October 2014.
- Actually, Saudi Arabia Could Get a Nuclear Weapon. CNN. 19 June 2015.
- Bashar Al-Assad is Syria's Problem, Not Its Solution. CNN. 5 October 2015.
- Conspicuously Quiet in Saudi Arabia. Susris. 20 April 2011.
- Determinants of a New Saudi Oil Policy. Reuters. 2 December 2014.
- How Saudi Arabia Is Tying its Oil and Foreign Policies Together. The Telegraph. 18 May 2016.
- Hyped Energy Infrastructure Threat Assessments Fuel Price Speculation. Susris. 18 April 2011.
- Iran's Syrian Power Grab and Saudi Arabia. Project Syndicate. 19 November 2015.
- Meeting the Challenge of Fragmented Iraq: A Saudi Perspective. Center for Strategic and International Studies. 6 April 2006.
- National Security in Saudi Arabia: Threats, Responses, and Challenges. With Anthony Cordesman. Praeger. 30 September 2005.
- Obama's Last Chance with Saudi Arabia. The National Interest. 20 April 2016.
- Only Saudi Arabia Can Defeat ISIS. The Guardian. 22 December 2015.
- President Trump Goes to Saudi Arabia. Belfer Center for Science and International Affairs, Harvard Kennedy School. 19 May 2017.
- Qatar is Playing a Dangerous Game of Political Chicken. The National Interest. 6 August 2017.
- Saudi Arabia Gets Forceful on Foreign Policy. The Washington Post. 24 October 2013.
- Saudi Arabia is Emerging as the New Arab Superpower. The Telegraph. 5 May 2015.
- Saudi Arabia is Preparing Itself in Case Iran Develops Nuclear Weapons. The Telegraph. 29 June 2015.
- Saudi Arabia Shifts to More Activist Foreign Policy Doctrine. Al Monitor. 17 October 2013.
- Saudi Arabia Shifts to More Assertive Defense Doctrine. Al Monitor. 3 June 2014.
- Saudi Arabia Will Lead. Susris. 20 November 2011.
- Saudi Arabia's Gulf Union Project Includes Military Dimension. Al Monitor. 29 December 2013.
- Saudi Arabia's Master Plan Against ISIS, Assad, and Iran in Syria. The National Interest. 16 February 2016.
- Saudi Arabia's New Role in the Emerging Middle East. BBC News. 28 April 2011.
- Saudi Arabia's Strategic Energy Initiative: Safeguarding Against Supply Disruptions. Center for Strategic and International Studies. 9 November 2006.
- Saudi Oil Supplies are Safe and Secure. CNN. 7 April 2011.
- Stepping Into Iraq. The Washington Post. 29 November 2006.
- Syria Tragedy a Turning Point for the West. CNN. 16 September 2013.
- The Arab D-Day. With Jamal Khashoggi. The New York Times. 8 September 2013.
- The Collapsing Arab State. Project Syndicate. 25 April 2013.
- The Day of Saudi Collapse Is Not Near. Foreign Policy. 13 April 2011.
- The $40-a-Barrel Mistake. The New York Times. 25 May 2004.
- The Iran Deal: A View from Saudi Arabia. Susris. 4 December 2013.
- The Liberation of Yemen Proves Saudi Arabia's Power is Growing. The Telegraph. 26 August 2015.
- The Long Hot Arab Summer: On the Viability of the Nation State System in the Arab World. Belfer Center for Science and International Affairs, Harvard Kennedy School. March 2013.
- The Macroeconomic Costs of Iran's Nuclear Program. Susris. 16 December 2013.
- The Muslim Brotherhood: A Failure in Political Evolution. July 2017. Belfer Center Intelligence Report.
- The Myth of Saudi Support for Terrorism. The Washington Times. 21 July 2016.
- The Oil Kingdom at 100: Petroleum Policymaking in Saudi Arabia. Washington Institute for Near East Policy. 1 December 2001.
- The Salman Doctrine: The Saudi Reply to Obama's Weakness. The National Interest. 30 March 2016.
- The Saudi Coalition Is Right. Qatar's Support for the Muslim Brotherhood Must Not Stand. The Telegraph. 19 July 2017.
- The Saudis and Containing Iran in Lebanon. The Daily Star. 30 August 2006.
- The Saudis Can Crush Isis. New York Times. With Saud Al-Sarhan. 8 September 2014.
- The Truth about the Saudi Executions. Al Monitor. 25 January 2016.
- US Should Stand with Saudi Arabia in Yemen. Defense One. 6 October 2016.
- There Will Be No Uprising in Saudi Arabia. Foreign Policy. 10 March 2011.
- This Congressional Act Threatens US National Security. CNN.com, 29 August 2017.
- Trump Can End ISIS by Learning from Saudi Arabia. CNN. 27 April 2017.
- What the West Gets Wrong about Saudi Arabia. CNN. 22 November 2013.
- What will US-Saudi Summit Mean for Iranian Policy in the Middle East? Al Monitor. 6 September 2015.
- Why OPEC is Increasingly Irrelevant. Financial Times. 17 December 2014.
- Why Saudi Arabia is Stable Amidst Middle East Unrest. The Washington Post. 11 March 2011.
- Why Saudi Arabia Needs a New Defense Doctrine. CNN. 23 June 2014.
- Why Saudis Formed Anti-Terror Coalition. CNN. 22 December 2015.
- Why Saudis May Take on Iraq's Shia Militias. Al Monitor. 29 February 2016.
- Shame on the Arabs. Foreign Policy. 3 February 2019.
- Saudi Arabia just won control of the oil market. CNN. 20 March 2020.
- The American oil boom is over. CNN. 23 April 2020.
