= King's Building, London =

King's Building
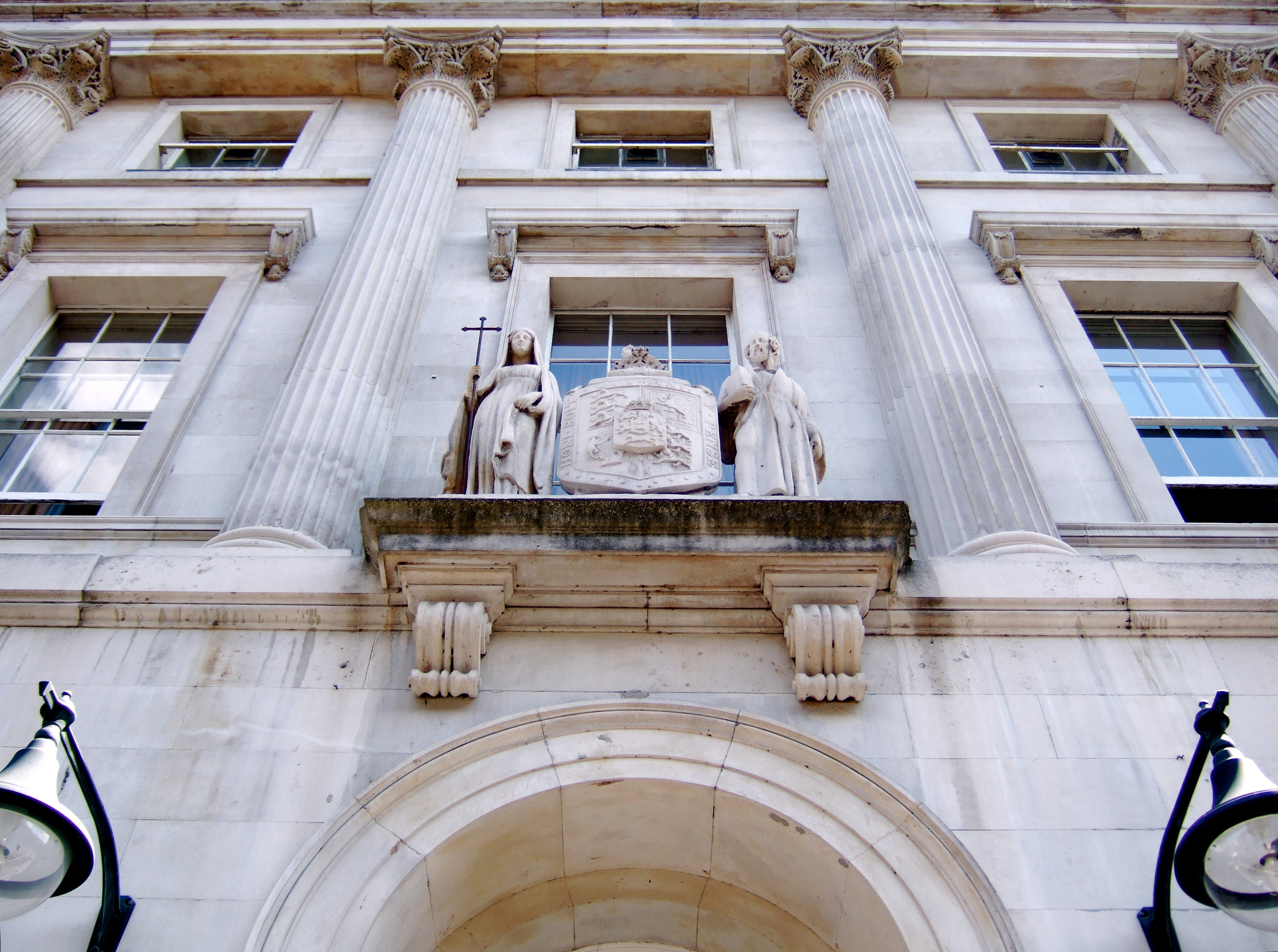
- The entrance of the Grade I listed 19th century King's Building, Strand Campus

- Location within Central London

General information
- Location: Strand; London, WC2, United Kingdom
- Coordinates: 51°30′41″N 0°06′58″W
- Construction started: 1829
- Completed: 1831; 195 years ago

Technical details
- Floor count: 8

Design and construction
- Architect: Sir Robert Smirke
- Designations: Grade I listed building

Website
- King's College London Strand Campus

The King's Building is a Grade I listed building that forms part of the Strand Campus of King's College London in the United Kingdom. Originally named the College Building, the King's Building was designed by Sir Robert Smirke in the course of the college's foundation in 1829. As the founding building, it was built between 1829 and 1831 on land granted to King's College by the government to complete the riverside frontage of Somerset House.

There are today a total of eight floors in the King's Building: Basement level, Ground level, Levels 1 to 4, Level 4U and Level 6. The King's Building houses a number of administrative departments (Estates & Facilities Offices, Admissions Office, Accommodation and Cashiers' Office), lecture theatres (most notably the Edmond J. Safra Lecture Theatre and Anatomy Lecture Theatre), the College Chapel, the Great Hall, various function rooms (Old Council Room, Committee Room, River Room, Somerset Room, St David's Room), study rooms and a catering outlet.

== King's Building Foyer ==
King's Building Foyer is the old entrance hall of the building. Two marble statues of Sappho and Sophocles are placed in the foyer. They were bequeathed in 1923 by Frida Mond, the wife of Ludwig Mond and a friend of Israel Gollancz, Professor of English Language and Literature at King's College London. The two statues are said to symbolise the King's motto of sancte et sapienter ('holiness and wisdom').

Two marble statues of famous Greek writers
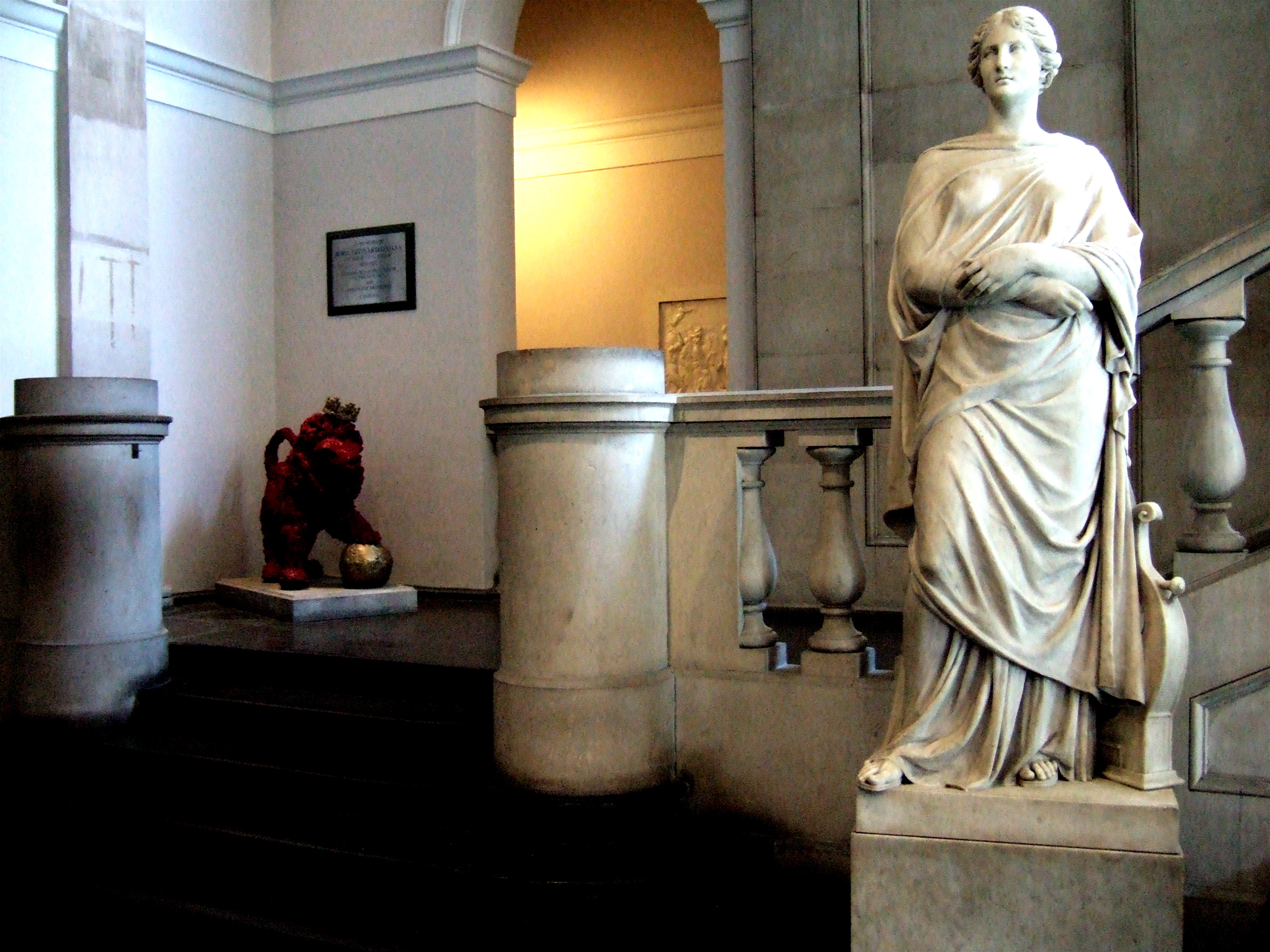
Sappho

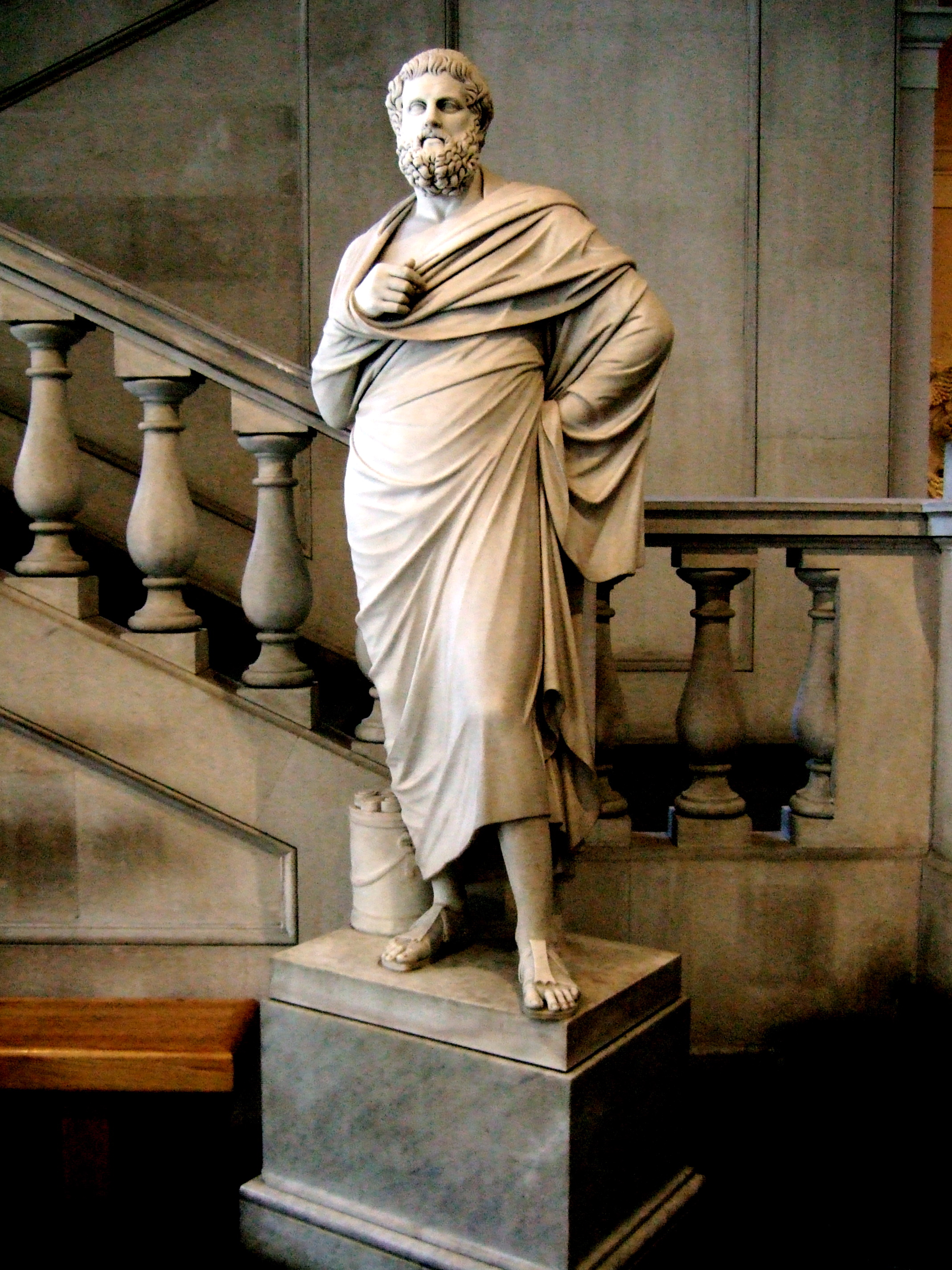
Sophocles

The papier-mâché version of Reggie the Lion, the mascot of King's College London Students' Union (KCLSU) is also placed in the King's Building foyer, behind Sappho on the staircase outside the Great Hall.

The King's Building Foyer regularly displays free exhibitions in foyer display cases. The exhibitions are curated by King's College London Archives and Special Collections, Liddell Hart Centre for Military Archives at King's, and sometimes co-curated with other organisations outside the College, such as the British Dental Association Museum.

== Great Hall ==
The Great Hall is located on the Ground floor of the King's Building. It is one of the central congregation spaces within the building, and is used for many events and activities, including the annual King's Fellows Dinner, banquetings, examinations, press conferences and presentations.

The architect of Buckingham Palace, John Nash, offered free services for the building and the Great Hall. However, this was declined by King's College. The College was in favour of the services of the architect of the British Museum, Sir Robert Smirke, since Smirke was already the architect of Somerset House.

In the 21st century, the Great Hall was refurbished and restored. Many original features and styles of the Hall have been restored, including the oak panelling, joinery and the King's College crest. The Grade I listed windows were repaired, and the Grade I listed ceiling and the original column capital were repainted.

== College Chapel ==
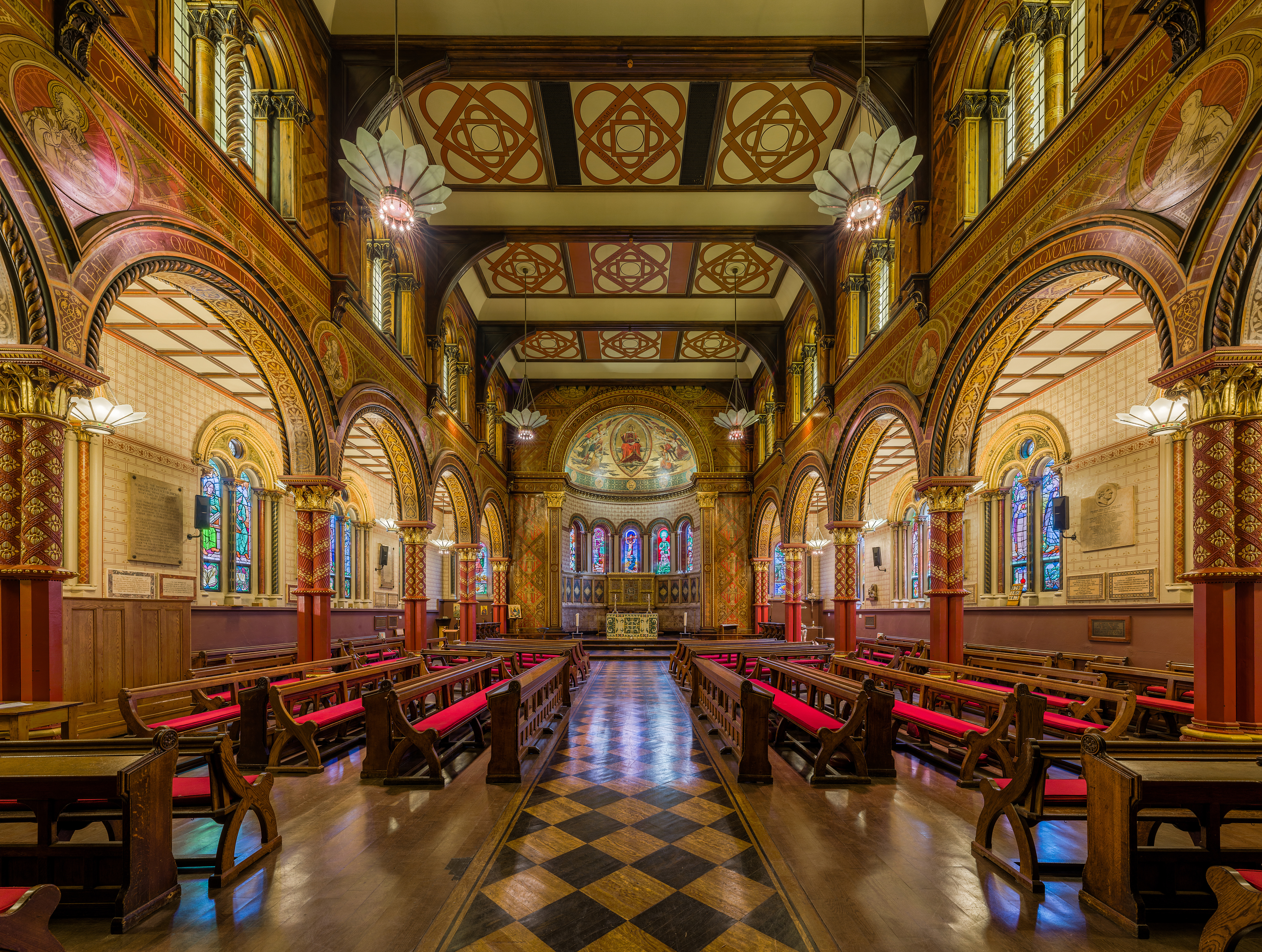
The Grade I listed King's College London Chapel designed by Sir George Gilbert Scott

The College Chapel forms part of the King's building. It was originally designed by Sir Robert Smirke in 1831. The Neo-Renaissance chapel seen today was designed and reconstructed by Sir George Gilbert Scott in 1864, at a cost of just over £7,000. The College Chapel is located on Level 2, which is above the Great Hall. It is accessible via a grand double staircase from the foyer.

The original chapel was described as a low and broad room "fitted to the ecclesiological notions of George IV's reign." However, it was proposed to be reconstructed in 1859 since its style had fallen out of fashion. Scott suggested that "...in a classic building, the best mode of giving ecclesiastical character is the adoption of the form and, in some degree, the character of an ancient basilica." There were many developments in the 20th century that changed the design of the chapel. For example, the windows were glazed with tinted cathedral glass instead of stained glass under church architect Dykes Bower's direction, and the original designs on the aisle and apse walls were repainted.

== Anatomy Theatre and Museum ==
The Anatomy Theatre and Anatomy Museum are located on Level 6 of the King's Building. The Anatomy Theatre was built in 1927 above the College Chapel. It was originally an institution (anatomical theatre) used in teaching anatomy, however the last anatomical dissection and demonstration took place in 1997.

Renovated in 2009, the Anatomy Theatre and Museum is now a facility for teaching, research and performance, and is programmed and managed by King's Cultural Institute. Because many original features of the Anatomy Theatre were still intact, restoration and replacements were carried out. A sprung floor was laid, Access Grid technology and digital surround sound was designed, and a projector was installed in the Anatomy Museum. The anatomy professor's office was also stripped back to its original tiles and was converted to a canteen.

== Gallery ==
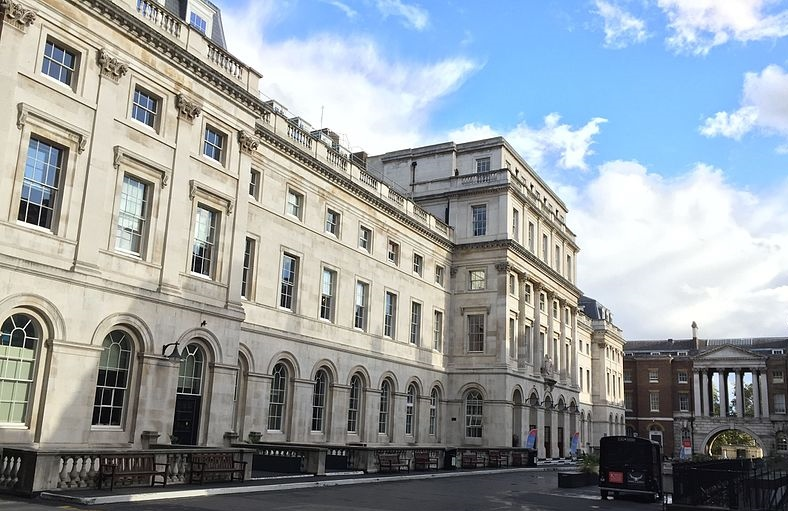
King's Building

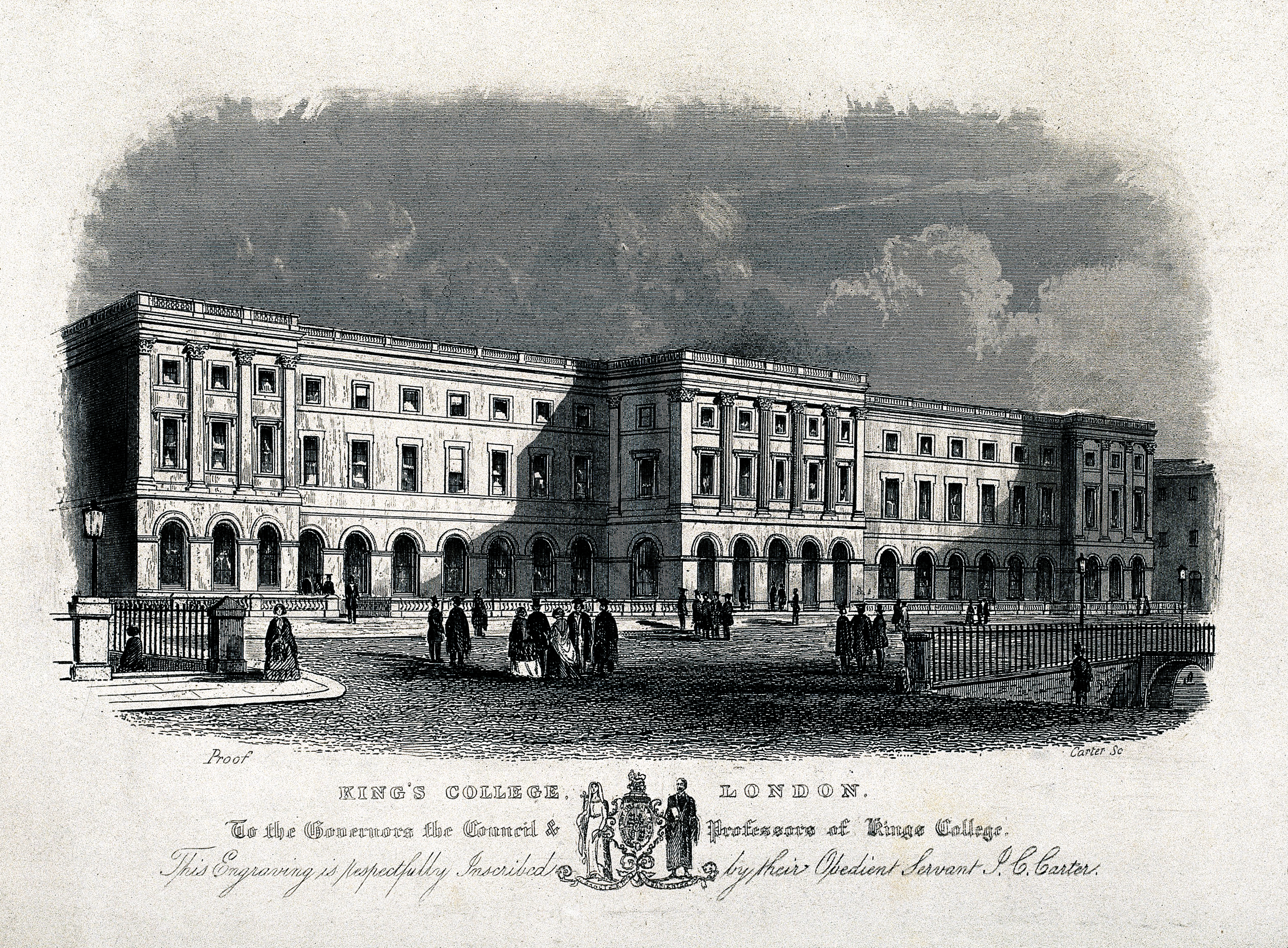
King's Building Engraving by J. C. Carter

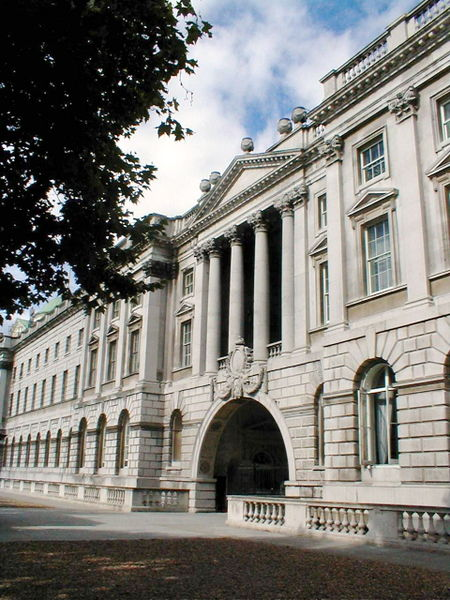
The Embankment terrace entrance to the Strand Campus

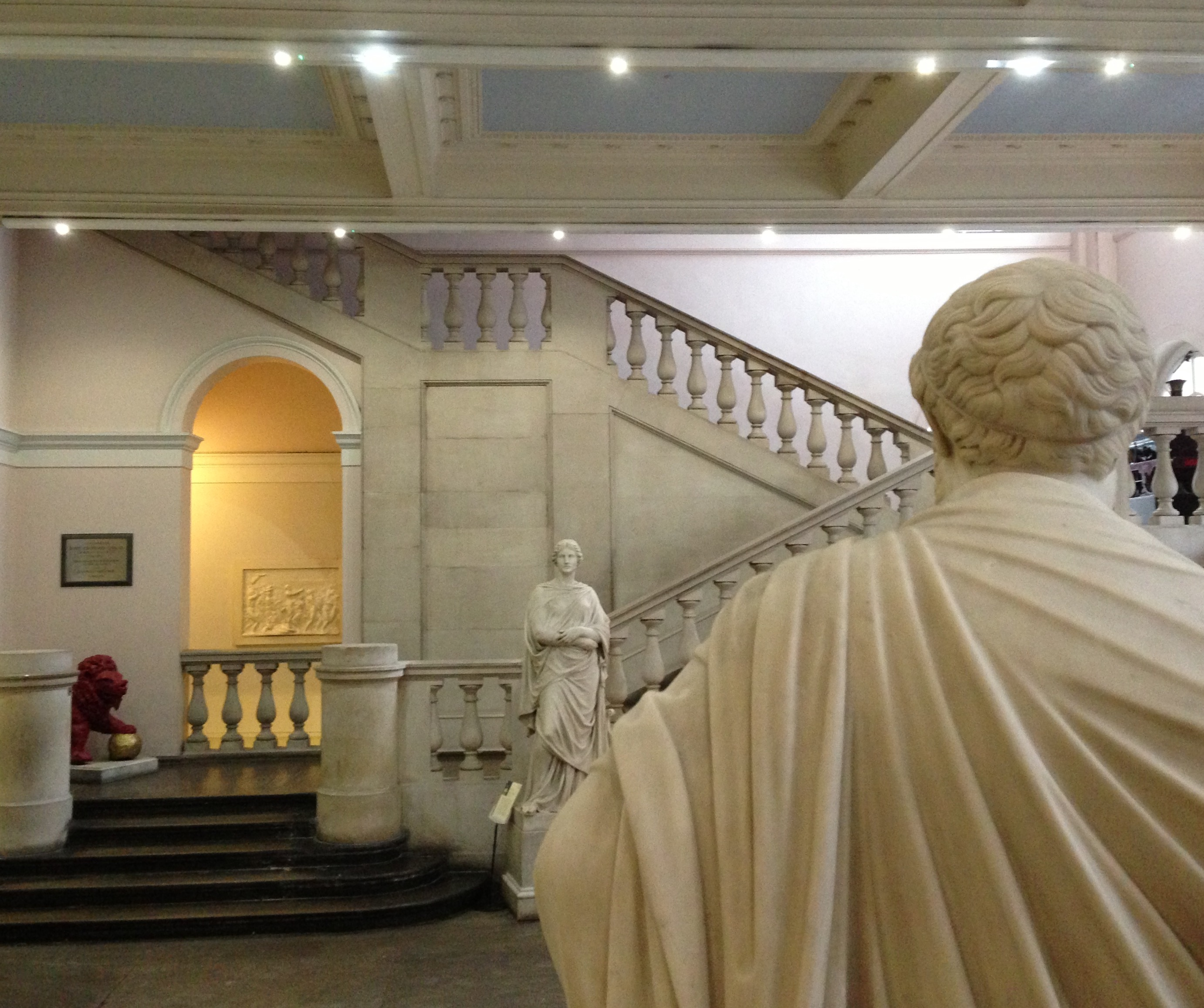
King's Building Foyer

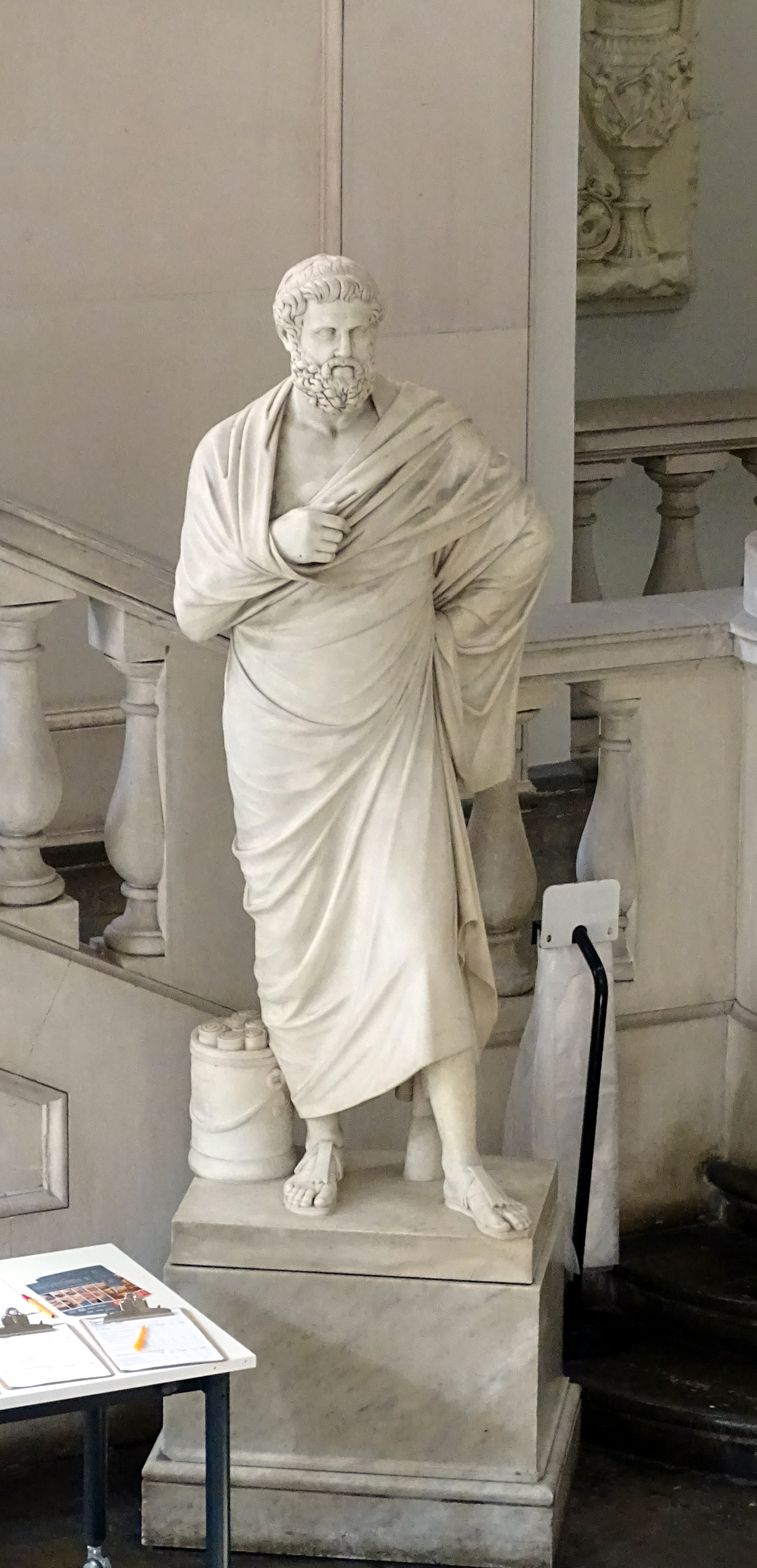
Sophocles Statue in the Foyer of King's Building

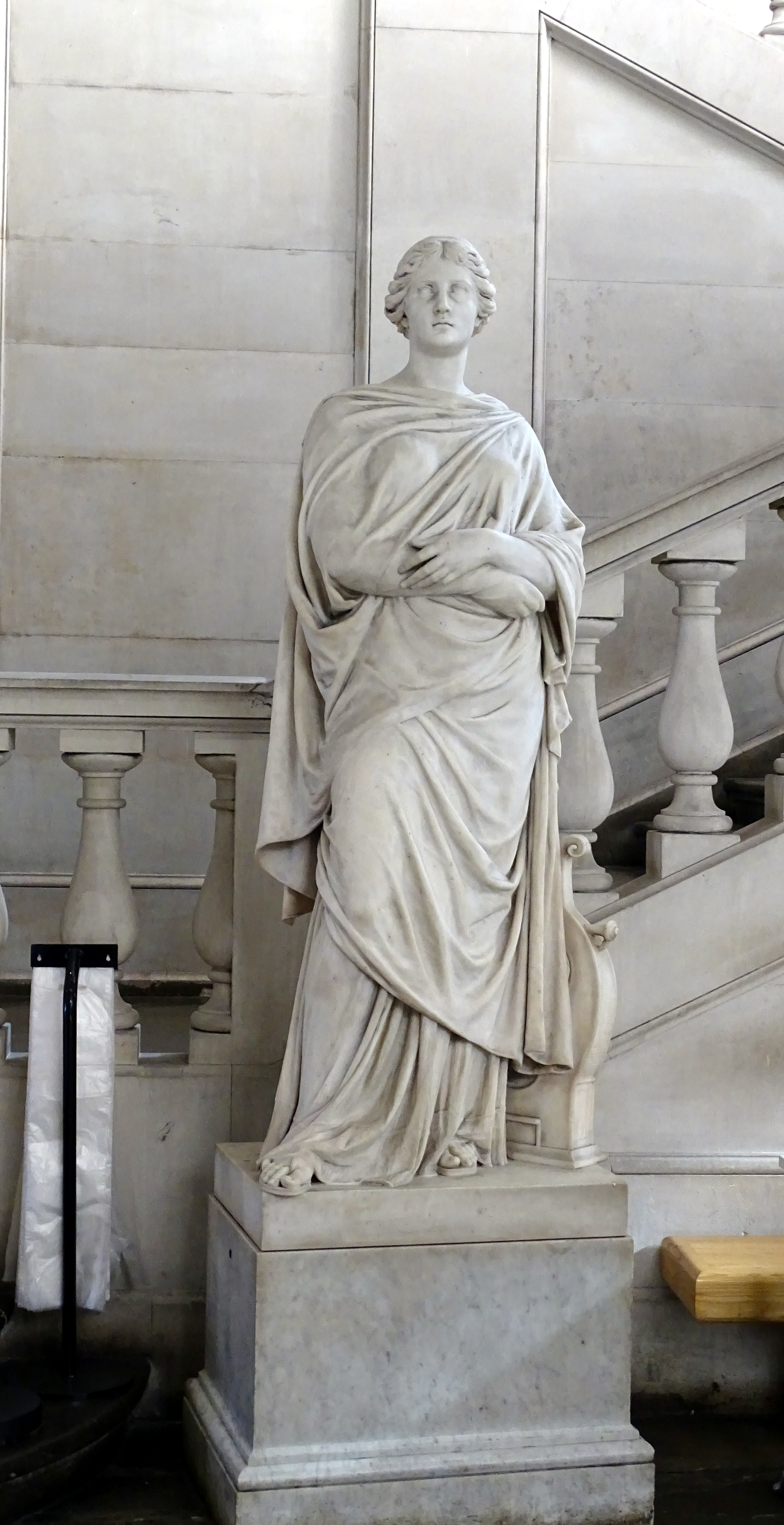
Sappho Statue in the Foyer of King's Building

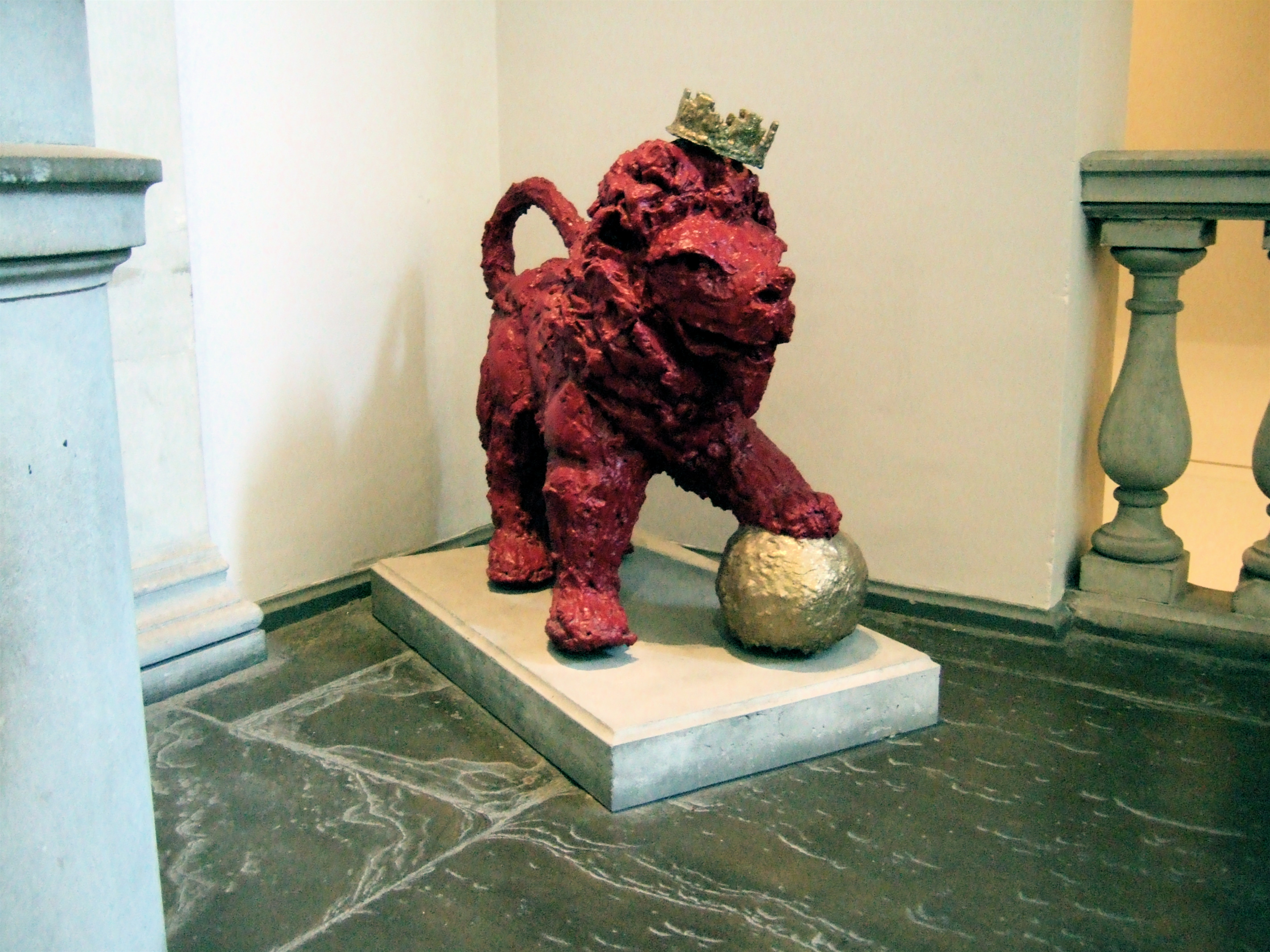
King's Mascot "Reggie the Lion" in the Foyer of King's Building
