= Jack Spence =

Jack Spence may refer to:

- Jack Spence (academic) (1931–2025), British academic
- Jack Spence (politician) (1905–1981), Canadian politician
- British rock musician in We Are the Ocean
