= Vivienne Jabri =

British academic and writer

Vivienne Jabri is a British academic and writer. She is professor of international politics in the Department of War Studies, King's College London.

== Affiliations ==
- Groundzero: Conflitti globali (editorial board member)
- ISA's International Political Sociology section, elected member of the executive committee
- British International Studies Association (ISA) Executive Committee
- Chair, ISA's International Political Sociology section

== Writings ==
- Jabri, Vivienne (1990). Mediating conflict : decision-making and Western intervention in Namibia. Manchester University Press. OCLC 20930696.
- Jabri, Vivienne (1996). Discourses on violence : conflict analysis reconsidered. Manchester University Press. OCLC 32779075.
- Vivienne Jabri and Eleanor O'Gorman (eds.) Women Culture and International Relations (Lynne Rienner, 1999).
- V. Jabri, Explorations of Difference in Normative International Relations, Chapter Three in V. Jabri and E. O'Gorman (eds.), Women, Culture, and International Relations (Lynne Rienner, 1999).
- V. Jabri, Discourse Ethics, Democratic Practice, and the Possibility of Inter-Cultural Understanding, Chapter Three in H. Smith (ed.), Democracy and International Relations (Macmillan, London and New York, 2000).
- V. Jabri, Reflections on the Study of International Relations, T.C. Salmon (ed.), Issues in International Relations (Routledge, 2000).
- V. Jabri, Feminist Ethics and Hegemonic Global Politics, Alternatives, Vol. 29, No. 3 (June–July 2004), pp. 265–284.
- V. Jabri, Critical Thought and Political Agency in Time of War, International Relations, Vol. 19, No. 1 (March 2005), pp. 70–79.
- V. Jabri, War, the Politics of Security, and the Liberal State (Centre for European Policy Studies for the ELISE project, 2005).
- V. Jabri, The Limits of Agency in Time of Emergency, J.P.A. Huysmans et al., The Politics of Protection (Routledge, 2005).
- Jabri, Vivienne (2007). War and the Transformation of Global Politics. London: Palgrave Macmillan UK. doi:10.1057/9780230626393. ISBN 978-1-349-28243-2.
- V. Jabri, Biopower and the Corporeality of Globalised Warfare, Michael Dillon and Andrew Neal (eds.), Foucault: Politics, Society, and War (Palgrave, 2008)
- V. Jabri. The Postcolonial Subject: Claiming Politics/Governing Others in Late Modernity (Routledge, 2012).
