= Anne Spence =

American aerospace engineer and engineering educator

Anne Marie Oetting Spence is an American aerospace engineer focusing on engineering education. She is a clinical professor of mechanical engineering and associate dean for academic affairs in the Baylor University School of Engineering and Computer Science.

== Education and career ==
After a childhood hobby of model rocketry, and helping to fly her father's airplane, Spence majored in aerospace engineering at the University of Missouri Rolla, now the Missouri University of Science and Technology, where her father, Robert Oetting, was an aerospace engineering professor. After graduating in 1985, she worked from 1985 to 1988 as a handling qualities engineer for Bell Helicopter, a job that included riding in and even flying helicopters as well as designing flight simulators for them.

She received a master's degree in aerospace engineering in 1988 from the University of Texas at Arlington, and completed a Ph.D. in aerospace engineering in 1994 from the University of Maryland, College Park. Her dissertation, A design-oriented aeromechanical analysis for hingeless rotor helicopters in turning flight, was supervised by Roberto Celi.

She continued at the University of Maryland, College Park, as a lecturer, visiting assistant professor, and interim director of Women in Engineering from 1995 to 2001. In 2001 she moved to the University of Maryland, Baltimore County, where she was, successively, a lecturer of mechanical engineering from 2001 to 2004, assistant professor from 2004 to 2011, and professor of the practice from 2011 to 2017. She was interim director of the Center for Women in Technology from 2015 to 2016, and director of the Center for Research, Teaching and Learning and director of engineering and computing education from 2016 to 2017.

In 2017 she moved to Baylor University as a clinical associate professor of mechanical engineering. She was promoted to clinical professor in 2022.

== Recognition ==
Spence was elected as an ASME Fellow in 2018. In 2021 she was named to the Academy of Mechanical and Aerospace Engineers of the Missouri University of Science and Technology.
