= Mats Berdal =

Norwegian academic

- Born: October 5, 1965; Norway

Academic background
- Education: London School of Economics; St Antony's College, Oxford

Academic work
- Discipline: Strategic Studies; Conflict Security and Development; The UN and International Security; Comparative Civil Wars; Cold War History
- Institutions: King's College London

Mats R. Berdal (born 5 October 1965) is Professor of Security and Development at the Department of War Studies, King's College London.

== Early life ==
Mats R. Berdal was born on 5 October 1965. He gained a BSc degree from the London School of Economics in 1988, and a DPhil degree from St Antony's College, Oxford in 1992.

== Career ==
From 2000 to 2003 Berdal was Director of Studies at the International Institute for Strategic Studies (IISS) in London. Between 2007 and 2011, Berdal was a visiting professor at the Norwegian Defence University College and was a Consulting Senior Fellow at the IISS from 2009 to 2011, responsible for the Institute’s “Economics and Conflict Resolution Programme”.

In 2003, Berdal joined the Department of War Studies, King's College London where he directs the Conflict, Security and Development Research Group (CSDRG) and is the Programme Director for the MA in Conflict, Security and Development.

== Books ==
- Power after Peace: The Political Economy of State-building, co-edited by Dominik Zaum (Routledge, 2012)
- The Peace In Between: Postwar Violence and Peacebuilding, co-edited by Astri Suhrke (Routledge, 2011)
- Ending War, Consolidating Peace: Economic Perspectives, co-edited by Achim Wennmann (Routledge, 2010)
- Building Peace After War (Routledge, 2009)
- Reintegrating Armed Groups After Conflict: Politics, Violence and Transition, co-edited by David H. Ucko (Routledge, 2009)
- United Nations Interventionism, 1991-2004, co-edited by Spyros Economides (Cambridge UP, 2007)
- Business as Usual? Transnational Organised Crime and International Security, co-edited by Monica Serrano (Lynne Rienner, 2002)
- Studies in International Relations - Essays by Philip Windsor ed. (Sussex AP, 2000)
- Greed and Grievance: Economic Agendas in Civil Wars, co-edited by David Malone (Lynne Rienner, 2000)
- The United States, Norway and the Cold War, 1954-1960 (Macmillan, 1996)
