= Jack Spence (political scientist) =

British academic (1931–2025)

John Edward Spence, OBE (11 June 1931 – 15 August 2025) was a British academic who was a Professor of Diplomacy at the Department of War Studies, King's College London from 1997. He was known as a scholar of diplomacy and South African politics.

== Life and career ==
Spence was born on 11 June 1931 in Krugersdorp, South Africa. He was educated at Pretoria Boys High School, South Africa; the University of Witwatersrand; and the London School of Economics. He lectured at a variety of universities in Britain, South Africa and the United States and was Professor of Politics and Pro-Vice Chancellor at the University of Leicester (1973–1991). He was employed as Director of Studies at the Royal Institute of International Affairs (1991–1997). He worked at the Department of War Studies at King's College London for 23 years beginning in 1997. Spence co-founded the British Journal of International Studies and the Journal of Southern African Studies, and edited International Affairs.

In 2002, Spence was appointed to the Order of the British Empire for teaching services to the Ministry of Defence.

Spence died on 15 August 2025, at the age of 94.

== Bibliography ==
- Republic Under Pressure (1965)
- Lesotho - Politics of Dependence (1968)
- Political and Military Framework of Investment in South Africa (1976)
- British Politics in Perspective (ed with R Borthwick, 1985)
- Change in South Africa (1994)
- Violence in Southern Africa (1997)
- After Mandela: The 1999 South African Election (1999)
- Seaford House Papers (2000–08)
- Ending Apartheid (with D Welsh, 2011)
