= Peter Paret =

German-born American historian (1924–2020)

- Born: April 13, 1924; Berlin, Germany
- Died: September 11, 2020 (aged 96); Salt Lake City, Utah, United States
- Spouse: Dr. Isabel Paret
- Relatives: Paul Cassirer (grandfather); Ernst Cassirer (great-uncle); Siegfried Bernfeld (step-father)
- Military career
- Allegiance: United States
- Service years: 1943–1946
- Rank: Staff Sergeant
- Other work: historian

Peter Paret (April 13, 1924 – September 11, 2020) was a German-born American cultural and intellectual historian, whose two principal areas of research were war and the interaction of art and politics from 18th to 20th century Europe. He also wrote on related subjects.

== Early life ==
Paret was born in 1924 in Berlin, the son of Hans Paret and Suzanne Aimée Cassirer. On his father's side, he is descended from a French family that emigrated to Germany in 1679. Thirteen of Paret's ancestors, including his great-grandfather and grandfather, were Protestant ministers. His father, severely wounded in the First World War, studied philosophy before turning to business, and after the Second World War became head of the firm Beuck and Paret, business consultants. Paret's mother, who began to study medicine after her marriage, came from a Jewish family well known for the past two centuries in manufacturing (weaving looms, steel cables), finance, publishing, and scholarship. Her father, Paul Cassirer, publisher and art dealer, was an important force for modernism in the arts in Germany. The philosopher Ernst Cassirer was her uncle. In 1932, Paret's parents were divorced, and his mother with her young daughter moved to Vienna, where she continued her studies with Sigmund Freud. Paret followed in January 1933. In the following year, his mother married the psychoanalyst and educational reformer Siegfried Bernfeld and with her husband and children moved to France, and in August 1937 to the United States, where they settled in San Francisco.

== Career ==
Paret entered the University of California, Berkeley, in January 1942, was drafted the following year, and served in combat intelligence and operations sections of an infantry battalion in the New Guinea and Philippine campaigns and in Korea. In 1946, at the age of 21, he was discharged with the rank of Staff Sergeant, reentered UC Berkeley as a sophomore, and graduated in 1949, after which he returned to Europe to reconnect with his father and other relatives. His plan to study art history was interrupted by the need to assist his mother during his stepfather's final illness, and it was not until 1955 that he began graduate study, this time in history, at King's College London.

He wrote his dissertation on the Prussian Reform era under Michael Howard, became an early member of the Institute for Strategic Studies, served as Resident Tutor in the Delegacy of Extra-Mural Studies of Oxford University, and in the last year before receiving his degree, began to publish articles on contemporary military thought as well as on recent history, having found important documents in the British archives, including a lost register of a Gestapo prison established after the attempt on Hitler's life on July 20, 1944.

After receiving his Ph.D., in 1960, Paret returned to the United States as Research Associate at the Center of International Studies, Princeton University, where he spent two years. With John W. Shy, who was then a finishing graduate student at Princeton, he wrote his first book, Guerrillas in the 1960s (New York, 1961), a short work analyzing the nature of irregular warfare and the difficulties it posed to modern, industrialized societies, which was reprinted several times, and came out in an expanded edition the following year.

In 1962, Paret joined the University of California, Davis as a visiting assistant professor. He became an associate professor in 1963 and a full professor in 1966. In 1965, he helped establish a graduate program that incorporated his broad, integrative approach to the historical study of war. During these years at an innovative, rapidly expanding campus, which he later characterized as the happiest in his academic career, he published a study of the modern French theory of political-military warfare, French Revolutionary Warfare from Indochina to Algeria (New York, 1966), and an expanded version of his dissertation, Yorck and the Era of Prussian Reform (Princeton, 1966), a work combining ideological analysis with the study of operational and tactical doctrine, and prepared the context for his growing interest in the ideas and life of Clausewitz, who as a young officer was an active member of the Prussian reform movement.

In 1969, after a year at the Center for Advanced Study in the Behavioral Sciences, Paret was appointed professor of history at Stanford University; and in 1977 he became the Raymond A. Spruance Professor of International History there. Paret was also a co-founder of the "Clausewitz Project" at Princeton, which examined the intellectual and cultural context of Carl von Clausewitz's military writings.

In 1976, having written several articles on the life and work of Clausewitz, he published a biography, Clausewitz and the State (now in its third expanded edition), which has been translated into three languages. Paret's work together with Raymond Aron's Penser la guerre: Clausewitz, published in the same year, placed Clausewitz firmly in the history of ideas and politics of the Revolutionary, Napoleonic, and post-Napoleonic periods. Paret and Aron reviewed each other's works favorably, although their perspectives on the subject differed. Unlike Aron, Paret has shown little interest in the influence of Clausewitz's ideas on more recent and contemporary conflicts. He studies him, he has said, as he would study Mozart – for what he has composed, not for how later conductors or opera directors perform his work. The title of Paret's book points to the powerful role the Prussian state played in Clausewitz's life, a power that reappears in the central role of policy and politics in Clausewitz's theories.

The same year the biography appeared, Howard's and Paret's translation of Clausewitz's major theoretical work, On War, was published. Highly praised, it has also received some criticism. The work, now available in five English-language editions, has been repeatedly reprinted. Paret's recent article, "Translation, Literal or Accurate," in The Journal of Military History, July 2014, outlines the principles he and Howard followed in converting Clausewitz's early 19th century German into modern English – principles of translation that also apply to Paret's and Daniel Moran's subsequent translations of Clausewitz's Historical and Political Writings (Princeton, 1992). A related project was Paret's new edition of Makers of Modern Strategy (Princeton, 1986), which retained three essays from the 1943 original, revised four others, and added twenty-two new essays. The work continues to be widely read and used as a text.

Since 1980, when his study of modern art and its enemies in imperial Germany, The Berlin Secession, appeared, Paret has published several monographs and collections of essays in the history of art, three of which have been translated into German. He combined his interests in the history of art and the history of war in Imagined Battles: Reflections of War in European Art (Chapel Hill, 1997), a work dedicated "to the memory of the men with whom I served, and against whom I served, in New Guinea and the Philippines." Paret also wrote about the methodology of military history. His article "The New Military History" appeared in Parameters in 1991.

In 1986, Paret became the Andrew W. Mellon Professor in the Humanities at the Institute for Advanced Study in Princeton. He became professor emeritus in 1997. His later books included Clausewitz in His Time: Essays in the Cultural and Intellectual History of Thinking about War (Berghahn Books, 2014) and, with Hans Delbrück, Krieg, Geschichte, Theorie (2018).

Paret continued publishing on Clausewitz late in his career. His final published article, "From the Discovery of a Clausewitz Manuscript to Its Interpretation", appeared in The Journal of Military History in July 2020.

Paret died at his home in Salt Lake City on September 11, 2020, at the age of 96.

== Honors and awards ==
Paret was a Fellow of the American Academy of Arts and Sciences, a member of the American Philosophical Society, an Honorary Fellow of the London School of Economics, and an Honorary Member of the German Clausewitz Society. He received the society's Silver Pin of Honor in 2019.

Paret received the Society for Military History's Moncado Prize in 1970 and the Samuel Eliot Morison Prize in 1993. In 1993, he also received the Thomas Jefferson Medal for Distinguished Achievement in the Arts, Humanities, and Social Sciences from the American Philosophical Society. He received the Historical Society's Jack Miller Center Prize in 2010 and the Pritzker Literature Award for Lifetime Achievement in Military Writing in 2017.

Paret was selected for the Carl von Clausewitz Prize of the city of Burg in 2020. The presentation was postponed during the COVID-19 pandemic, and following Paret's death, the award was presented posthumously to his daughter in 2021.

== Publications ==
A bibliography of Paret's publications is available through the Institute for Advanced Study. A list of all monographs and edited volumes, including foreign-language editions, complemented by a short biography appeared in The Second Generation: Émigrés from Nazi Germany as Historians, ed. A. Daum, H. Lehmann, J. Sheehan, New York 2016, pp. 420‒22; this volume also includes an autobiographical essay entitled "External Events, Inner Drives" (pp. 72‒78).
