= Michael Howard (historian) =

English military historian (1922–2019)

Sir Michael Howard OM CH CBE MC FBA FRHistS
- Born: Michael Eliot Howard; 29 November 1922; London, England
- Died: 30 November 2019 (aged 97); Swindon, England
- Education: Christ Church, Oxford (MA)
- Occupation: Historian
- Title: Regius Professor of Modern History
- Term: 1980–1989
- Predecessor: Hugh Trevor-Roper
- Successor: John Elliott
- Partner: Mark Anthony James (Civil Partnership: 2006–2019)
- Military career
- Allegiance: United Kingdom
- Branch: British Army
- Service years: 1942–1945
- Rank: Lieutenant
- Service number: 253901
- Unit: Coldstream Guards
- Conflicts: Second World War
- Awards: Military Cross

Sir Michael Eliot Howard OM CH CBE MC FBA FRHistS (29 November 1922 – 30 November 2019) was an English military historian, formerly Chichele Professor of the History of War, Honorary Fellow of All Souls College, Regius Professor of Modern History at the University of Oxford, Robert A. Lovett Professor of Military and Naval History at Yale University, and founder of the Department of War Studies, King's College London. In 1958, he co-founded the International Institute for Strategic Studies.

In 2013, Howard was described in the Financial Times as "Britain's greatest living historian". The Guardian described him as "Britain's foremost expert on conflict".

== Early life ==
Howard was born on 29 November 1922 in Brompton, London, the youngest son of Geoffrey Howard and Edith (née Edinger). His mother was the daughter of Jewish immigrants from Germany, who later converted to Christianity. His father was the chairman of a manufacturing company. Howard was educated at Wellington College and Christ Church, Oxford. He graduated with a Bachelor of Arts (BA) degree in 1946, which was later promoted to Master of Arts (MA) in 1948.

Howard joined the British Army and was commissioned as a second lieutenant into the Coldstream Guards on 4 December 1942. He was given the personal number 253901. He fought in the Italian Campaign, serving with the 3rd Battalion, Coldstream Guards, and came ashore during the landings at Salerno in September 1943. On 27 January 1944, during the First Battle of Monte Cassino, he was awarded the Military Cross (MC) "in recognition of gallant and distinguished services in Italy".

== Academic career ==
After Oxford, Howard began his teaching career at King's College London, where he helped to found the Department of War Studies. From his position at King's he was one of Britain's most influential figures in developing strategic studies as a discipline that brought together government, military, and academia to think about defence and national security more broadly and deeply than had been done before.

- Assistant Lecturer in History (1947), Lecturer (1950–3), Reader in War Studies and finally Professor of War Studies (1953–63), King's College London.
- Chichele Professor of History of War (from 1977) and Fellow, All Souls College (from 1968 to 1980).
- Regius Professor of Modern History and Fellow of Oriel College, Oxford [Honorary Fellow, 1990] (from 1980 to 1989).
- Robert A. Lovett Professor of Military and Naval History, Yale University (from 1989 to 1993).
- Quondam Fellow, All Souls College (from 1980 to 2014).
- Honorary Fellow, All Souls College (from 2014).

He was one of the founders of the International Institute for Strategic Studies. From his family, education, and service in the Guards, he had extensive connections at the higher levels of British society, and he worked them astutely to further his intellectual goals. He had close connections in the Labour Party but was also consulted as an advisor by Margaret Thatcher.

== Historical writing ==
Howard was best known for expanding military history beyond the traditional campaigns and battles accounts to include wider discussions about the sociological significance of war. In his account of the Franco-Prussian War of 1870–71, Howard looked at how the Prussian and French armies reflected the social structure of the two nations. He was also a leading interpreter of the writings of the Prussian military thinker Carl von Clausewitz, including preparing a translation of On War with the American historian Peter Paret.

In addition, in both his inaugural and concluding lectures as Regius Professor, and in his popular and influential War in European History, Howard stressed the difference between traditional military history, which seeks to identify easily applicable lessons for the present from the history of past wars and military campaigns, and his own approach, which stresses the uniqueness of the historical past and the impossibility of deriving such lessons to guide modern strategic and tactical choices.

In 1985, he delivered the Huizinga Lecture in the Dutch city of Leiden, under the title: 1945: End of an Era. Howard helped found the Department of War Studies and the Liddell Hart Centre for Military Archives at King's College London. He was president emeritus of the International Institute for Strategic Studies, which he also helped to establish, and a fellow of the British Academy.

== Personal life and death ==
In 1958, Howard met geography teacher Mark Anthony James, and they began a relationship. They entered into a civil partnership in 2006, and latterly lived in Eastbury, Berkshire. Howard died at a hospital in Swindon on 30 November 2019, at the age of 97; James died two months later.

== Awards and honours ==
Howard was appointed a Commander of the Order of the British Empire (CBE) in the 1977 Birthday Honours and a Knight Bachelor in the 1986 Birthday Honours. He was later appointed to the Order of the Companions of Honour (CH) for services to military studies in the 2002 Birthday Honours and to the Order of Merit (OM) in 2005. In 1988 he was elected a member of the Royal Swedish Academy of War Sciences. In 1992, he was awarded the Samuel Eliot Morison Prize for lifetime achievement given by the Society for Military History.

Coat of arms of Michael Howard
Crest A lion statant guardant tail extended Argent resting the dexter forepaw on a stag's head cabossed Or. Escutcheon Quarterly: 1st & 4th Gules a bend Argent between six cross crosslets Or on a canton Azure a stag's head cabossed Argent (Howard); 2nd & 3rd Argent a fess Gules between two bars wavy Azure in chief three Cornish choughs Proper (Eliot). Motto Sola Virtus Invicta (Virtue Alone Invincible)

== Work ==
- The Coldstream Guards, co-written with John Sparrow, 1920–1946, 1951.
- Disengagement in Europe, 1958.
- The Franco-Prussian War: The German Invasion of France, 1870–1871, 1961. Republished by Methuen, 1981. ISBN 0-416-30750-7 OCLC 8008934
- Lord Haldane and the Territorial Army, 1967.
- The Mediterranean Strategy in the Second World War, 1967.
- Grand Strategy, August 1942 – September 1943, Volume IV, Grand Strategy series, History of the Second World War (1970)
- Studies in War and Peace, 1970.
- The Continental Commitment: The Dilemma of British Defence Policy in the Era of Two World Wars, 1972.
- War in European History, 1976 [latest revised edition, 2009]. ISBN 0-192-89095-6 OCLC 251597992
- Carl von Clausewitz, On War, 1977, edited and translated by M. E. Howard and Peter Paret.
- Soldiers and Governments: Nine Studies in Civil Military Relations, 1978.
- War and the Liberal Conscience, 1978 [new edition, 2008].
- Restraints on War: Studies in the Limitation of Armed Conflict, 1979 edited by M. E. Howard.
- Clausewitz, 1983 [originally a volume in the Oxford University Press "Past Masters" series, reissued in 2000 as Clausewitz: A Very Short Introduction]. ISBN 0-192-87608-2 OCLC 8709266
- The Causes of War Harvard University Press; 2 edition (1 January 1984)
- Strategic Deception, 1990, (Volume 5 of British Intelligence in the Second World War; series edited by F. H. Hinsley; HMSO). ISBN 0-11-630954-7
- The Lessons of History, 1991. ISBN 978-0-19821-581-3
- The Laws of War: Constraints on Warfare in the Western World, 1994 edited by M. E Howard, George J. Andrepoulous and Mark R. Schulman. ISBN 0-300-05899-3 OCLC 30473599
- The Invention of Peace: Reflections on War and International Order, 2000. ISBN 978-1-86197-218-7

External videos
- Booknotes interview with Howard on The First World War, 16 March 2003, C-SPAN

- The First World War, 2003 [reissued as The First World War: A Very Short Introduction, 2007].
- Captain Professor: A Life in War and Peace (autobiography), 2006 ISBN 0-826-49125-1 OCLC 64313950
- Liberation or Catastrophe? Reflections on the History of the 20th Century, 2007
- Fighting with Pride LGBT in the Armed Forces, chapter 4, 2019 edited by Craig Jones ISBN 9781526765253

== Notes ==
Academic offices
New title	Head of Department of War Studies, King's College London; 1962–1968	Succeeded by Sir Laurence Martin
