= Liddell Hart Centre for Military Archives =

Coordinates: 51.5120°N 0.1162°W

The Liddell Hart Centre for Military Archives (LHCMA) at King's College London was set up in 1964. The Centre holds the private papers of over 700 senior British defence personnel who held office since 1900. Individual collections range in size from a single file to the 1000 boxes of Captain Sir Basil Liddell Hart's papers. To these are now being added research materials, notably interview transcripts, collected in connection with television documentaries and academic projects.

The scope of the holdings is vast, from high level defence policy and strategic planning as, for example, in the papers of Field Marshal Alan Brooke, 1st Viscount Alanbrooke and General Hastings Lionel Ismay, 1st Baron Ismay down to the command of individual units in the field. The Second Boer War is strongly represented and subsequently almost every major campaign in which British troops have fought, including the Korean and Falklands Wars and the Gulf Crisis; the latter two are covered by contemporary interview transcripts.

Many significant collections reflect the revolution in weapon technology in the 20th century and the re-evaluation of tactics and strategy which necessarily followed on from the invention of the tank and the development of air power. There is also much on the debate over nuclear issues.

The Centre's web site hosts the Location Register of Twentieth Century Defence Personnel, a database of some 3000 British defence personnel who achieved the ranks above and including Major General, Air Vice Marshal and Rear Admiral between the years 1900-1975.

The archives are open to readers able to demonstrate the seriousness of their interest in the papers. Military studies have been taught at King's College since 1927 and in 1953 a department of War Studies, the only university department of its kind in Great Britain, was established.
