= Lithuania men's national basketball team =

Men's national basketball team

Lithuania
- FIBA ranking: 10 (1 September 2026)
- Joined FIBA: 1936
- FIBA zone: FIBA Europe
- National federation: LKF
- Coach: Dainius Adomaitis
- Nickname(s): The Other Dream Team, The Second Religion, The Baltic Giants, The Green Death

Olympic Games
- Appearances: 7
- Medals: (bronze) Bronze: (1992, 1996, 2000)

FIBA World Cup
- Appearances: 6
- Medals: (bronze) Bronze: (2010)

EuroBasket
- Appearances: 16
- Medals: (gold) Gold: (1937, 1939, 2003); (silver) Silver: (1995, 2013, 2015); (bronze) Bronze: (2007)
Home	Away

First international
- Latvia 41–20 Lithuania (Riga, Latvia; 13 December 1925)

Biggest win
- Lithuania 112–9 Finland (Kaunas, Lithuania; 27 May 1939)

Biggest defeat
- United States 127–76 Lithuania ^{‡} (Barcelona, Spain; 6 August 1992)
Medal record
Olympic Games
Bronze medal – third place	1992 Barcelona	Team
Bronze medal – third place	1996 Atlanta	Team
Bronze medal – third place	2000 Sydney	Team
FIBA World Cup
Bronze medal – third place	2010 Turkey
EuroBasket
Gold medal – first place	1937 Latvia
Gold medal – first place	1939 Lithuania
Gold medal – first place	2003 Sweden
Silver medal – second place	1995 Greece
Silver medal – second place	2013 Slovenia
Silver medal – second place	2015 France
Bronze medal – third place	2007 Spain
Diamond Ball
Silver medal – second place	2004 Belgrade
Stanković Cup
Gold medal – first place	2005 Beijing

The Lithuania men's national basketball team (Lithuanian: Lietuvos nacionalinė vyrų krepšinio rinktinė) represents Lithuania in international basketball competitions. They are controlled by the Lithuanian Basketball Federation, the governing body for basketball in Lithuania. Despite Lithuania's small size, with a population of less than 3 million, the country's devotion to basketball has made them a traditional force of the sport in Europe.

The Lithuanian national team won the last EuroBasket tournaments prior to World War II, in 1937 and 1939. The 1939 team was led by Frank Lubin, who helped popularize basketball in the country and was called the "grandfather of Lithuanian basketball". Following the country's annexation by the Soviet Union during the war, Lithuanian players frequently formed the core of the Soviet national team. The most prevalent example was the 1988 Olympic basketball gold medal-winning team, where four Lithuanians formed the starting lineup: Valdemaras Chomičius, Rimas Kurtinaitis, Šarūnas Marčiulionis and Arvydas Sabonis.

After the restoration of Lithuanian independence in 1990, the national team was resurrected. Lithuania won bronze medals at the first three Summer Olympics to include NBA players – 1992, 1996, and 2000 – in addition to finishing fourth in 2004 and 2008, and in eighth place in 2012. The Lithuanian national team won the EuroBasket for the third time in 2003, and also a bronze medal at the 2010 FIBA World Cup.

== History ==
=== Early teams (1920s) ===
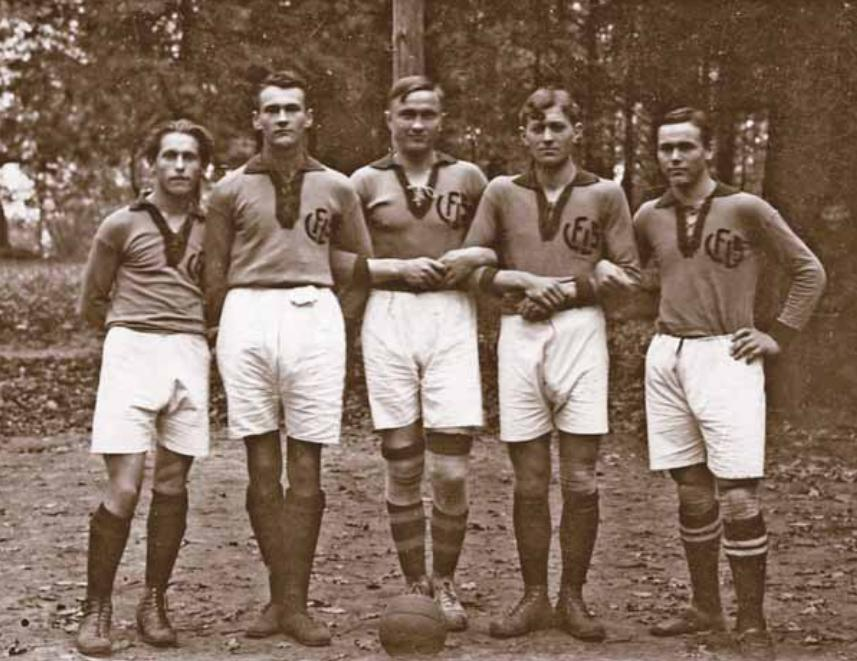
Lietuvos Fizinio Lavinimo Sąjunga (LFLS) had one of the first male basketball teams in Lithuania, back in 1923.

On 13 December 1925 in the Latvian capital Riga, Lithuanians played their first international game against their neighbors. Given the Latvians' experience with American YMCA (Young Men's Christian Association) coaches, they easily won 41–20. Later on, Latvians were crushing the future three-times European champions Lithuanians as well (41–29 or even 123–10). The Latvians also won the following year's game, 47–12. During the period, basketball saw its Lithuanian popularity declined, overshadowed by football. The cold climate and lack of suitable indoor arena only allowed for basketball to be played during the summer period, and even then those who practiced preferred other sports.

=== Lithuanian Americans build a squad (1930s) ===
Physical Culture Palace in 1938

Things started to improve in 1934, when the Physical Culture Palace was opened in Kaunas, featuring a spacious hall with 200 seats and cork floor built for tennis that was suitable for indoor basketball. In 1935, Lithuania decided to promote a World Lithuanian Congress in temporary capital Kaunas, inviting ethnic Lithuanians from many countries to unite the Lithuanian culture. The following year, a delegation of Lithuanian American athletes from Chicago arrived in Kaunas as participants of World Lithuanian Congress. Two of the players, Juozas "Joseph" Zukas and Konstantinas "Konnie" Savickas, stayed to teach basketball secrets to Lithuanians and be a part of the national team. Savickus in particular became a player-coach, and while the national team had just been trounced by inaugural European champions Latvia 123–10, one year later, with Savickas leading the team and exploiting stalling techniques, Lithuania trailed only 14–7 at halftime before losing 31–10.

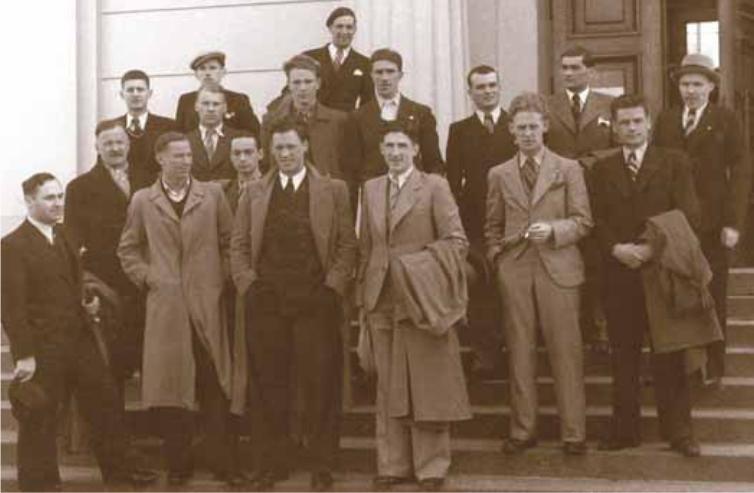
Lithuania national basketball team players and staff members in 1937

In 1936, Lithuania applied to become a member of FIBA and take part in international basketball competitions, including EuroBasket 1937, the second European basketball tournament that the Latvia Basketball Association as reigning champions would host in Riga. While Savickus had returned to America, another descendant of Lithuanians would arrive to aid the country's basketball rise. Frank Lubin, who won a gold medal at the first basketball Olympic tournament at the 1936 Summer Olympics in Berlin, was invited to visit the Baltic nation by a Lithuanian official in attendance. Going by the Lithuanian name Pranas Lubinas, he spent five months there and served as the country's first knowledgeable coach, helping spread various basketball techniques. Lubinas, along with Zukas, helped the Lithuanians beat the Latvians for the first time, 35 to 27.

"Physical Culture Palace director Mr. Augustauskas asked me: Could you win the European championship? I replied: Why not? Lithuanians already made significant progress and with one or two athletes from Chicago we could easily win that championship."

— Konstantinas Savickas, describing his first efforts to improve basketball in Lithuania.

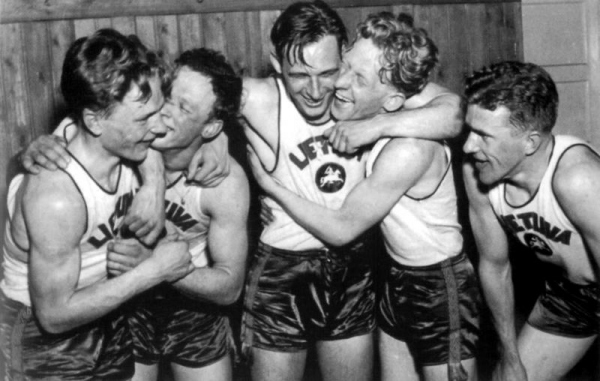
Lithuanians after defeating Italy in 1937

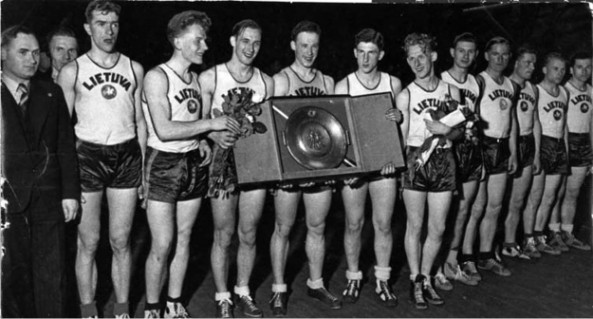
Lithuanians holding the EuroBasket 1937 trophy

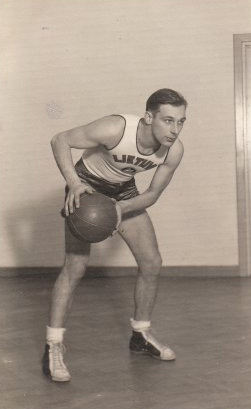
Feliksas Kriaučiūnas, one of the most notable basketball personalities in interwar Lithuania

The preparations for the EuroBasket 1937 started slowly, with players training only 4 hours a week. At first, it was decided that the national team at the tournament would not include any Lithuanian Americans; however the decision was reversed with only one month remaining, once a Latvian newspaper had printed an extensive article about the second European championship considering Lithuania the weakest of all contestants. Lithuanian player Leonas Baltrūnas was shocked at the article and along with journalist Jonas Narbutas, used a translated version of it to request the inclusion of Lithuanian Americans to Vytautas Augustauskas, director of the Physical Culture Palace. After a telegram was sent to the US, two players arrived one month prior to the tournament, Pranas Talzūnas and Feliksas Kriaučiūnas, the latter of whom was designated as player-coach. To keep secrecy on how Lithuanian Americans were strengthening the team, all preparation games were cancelled and instead prolonged training sessions before the trip to Riga were held behind closed doors. The national team was being prepared not only technically, but also physically. Even once the reinforcements were made public, opponents were skeptic, with Talzūnas later remembering other teams felt he and Kriaučiūnas were not quality players as "everyone thought that a good player must be tall, raising his hand and dunking into the basket.".

The efforts were successful – the Lithuanians became the champions of Europe for the first time, defeating all their opponents and with Talzūnas being picked as the tournament's most valuable player. Following the final victory over Italy, the famous Lithuanian tenor Kipras Petrauskas even interrupted his performance at the State Theatre to joyfully announce the triumph of the national basketball team. The crowd then rose to their feet and together sang the Lithuanian anthem. The team returned to a warm reception, with thousands gathering at a train station in a way Kriaučiūnas compared to "like we, here in America, greet the president." Basketball regained its ground immediately, and had its popularity rise abruptly, especially among students. Gymnasium teams from almost all counties competed in student games, teams were assembled in firms and basketball courts appeared all around the country. According to future player Stepas Butautas, "In every yard hoops are being made from barrels. Children, teenagers are throwing balls into them, others – even a sock crammed with clouts. Our Veršvai Primary School teacher K. Požemecka built two poles, made hoops from a willow and said: 'We will play basketball'." Future team coach Vladas Garastas added that "as kids we started using a barrel to make a hoop. We didn't have a ball, we stuffed in grass or whatever we could find".

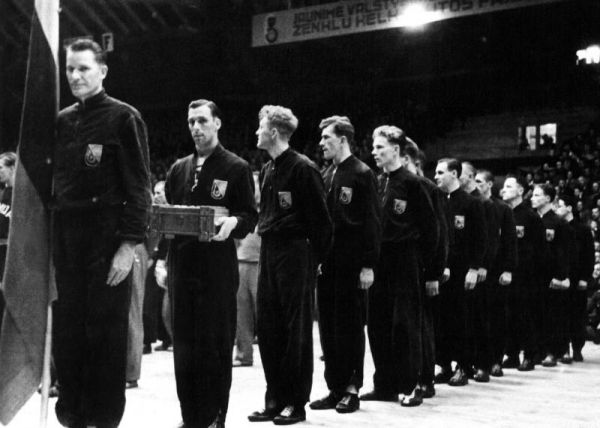
Lithuania national team during EuroBasket 1939. Pranas Lubinas is holding the Lithuanian tricolor.

Lithuania was granted the right to organize the EuroBasket 1939. In addition, the Kaunas Sports Hall, Europe's first dedicated basketball arena, was built. In the competition, the team roster mostly consisted of Lithuanian Americans, with five American-born players: the returning Feliksas Kriaučiūnas (Chicago), Juozas Jurgėla (Chicago), Vytautas Budriūnas (Waukegan), Mykolas Ruzgys and Pranas Lubinas (Glendale). As a result, there were several protests from other nations. Lubinas, who was the designated player-coach, lead Lithuania to a second continental title, even scoring the buzzer-beater in the decisive game against Latvia, which warranted a 37–36 victory.

=== After the restoration of independence (from 1990) ===
"I believe that new Sabonis and Marčiulions will grow up and will create a new superb team again."

— Konstantinas Savickas, first Lithuania national team coach, sharing his thoughts in 1991.

After Lithuania's independence was restored, the country wanted to stand on its own in the basketball community again, complete with the standout players from the 1988 Soviet squad – Sabonis, Marčiulions, Chomičius and Kurtinaitis – expressing a desire to represent Lithuania. The National Olympic Committee of Lithuania (LTOK) and Lithuanian Basketball Federation (LKF) were restored, Lithuania withdrew its athletes from all Soviet national competitions, and both Sabonis and Marčiulions refused a request to play for the Soviet Union during the 1990 Goodwill Games. In 1991, the International Olympic Committee welcomed Lithuania back to its ranks in September, and in December, LKF president Stanislovas Stonkus attended the FIBA congress in Springfield, Massachusetts, and requested the right to be a full member of FIBA once again. FIBA president George E. Killian granted Stonkus' request and invited Lithuania to participate in all of the FIBA organized events. Sabonis and his agent started looking for Lithuanian-born or descended players, sending phone calls and faxes over Europe and North America.

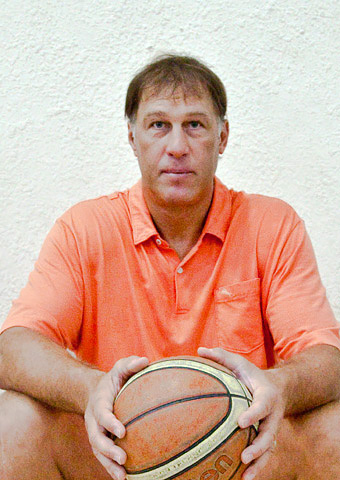
Šarūnas Marčiulionis, the first Lithuanian to play in the United States, was instrumental in getting funds for the national team's restoration.

However, Lithuania's economic transition left the country in a difficult financial situation, and LKF could hardly count on state funding. As a result, the team had to search for the financial supporters by themselves in order to play internationally. Šarūnas Marčiulionis had experience and contacts in the United States from being the first USSR player in the NBA, playing for the Golden State Warriors. Consequently, he, along with Donnie Nelson (son of Marčiulionis' then-coach Don Nelson), searched for financial supporters that could finance Lithuania's participation in the international games and the 1992 Summer Olympics. George Shirk wrote a story about this on the San Francisco Chronicle, and once American rock band Grateful Dead read the newspaper, they decided to help the team. Drummer Mickey Hart added that the story resonated with the bandmembers for being "a struggle for life, liberty and freedom." The bandmembers donated $5,000 to Marčiulionis, and helped launch a tie-dyed jerseys trade that would feature Lithuania's national colors and the iconic, trademarked 'Slam-Dunking Skeleton' created by N.Y. artist Greg Speirs. The skeleton dunking a flaming basketball, nicknamed "Skully", was the artist's interpretation of how the Lithuanian team rose from the ashes to victory. The artist's profits would be passed onto the Lithuania national basketball team and a fund for Lithuanian children. The Lithuanians were favourable to the garish shirts because, according to Nelson, it was a great contrast to "all those years of those Soviet colors, nothing but blues and grays". Arvydas Sabonis even said that "My first impression of [the jerseys] was: Wow, this really is a free Lithuania". The skeleton, nicknamed "Skully", was enshrined into the Basketball Hall of Fame, being the only cartoon character to be enshrined in any sports Hall of Fame. New versions of the Skully jerseys were featured in the following two Olympic Games.

To assume the head coach position, American Dan Peterson, then in Italy, was invited but declined. BC Žalgiris manager Raimundas Sargunas became coach, but problems with the players made him demoted to assistant, a job shared with Donnie Nelson and Spanish Javier Imbroda, who was invited following Sabonis' suggestion of a Liga ACB veteran. The eventual choice was Vladas Garastas, another Žalgiris veteran who was assistant in the 1988 Soviet squad.

=== 1992 Barcelona Summer Olympics ===
Preparation for Lithuania's first major international tournament since regaining independence began in May 1992, as it was the first time a squad of players mostly playing outside the country could get together and train. While missing Sabonis, Marčiulionis and Artūras Karnišovas, Lithuania competed in the eight-teams Nordic Countries Championship. They took the second place there, losing only to the well-known opponents Latvia 80–95 in the final. Standout players included Gintaras Krapikas (22.5 points per game) and Rimas Kurtinaitis (19 points).

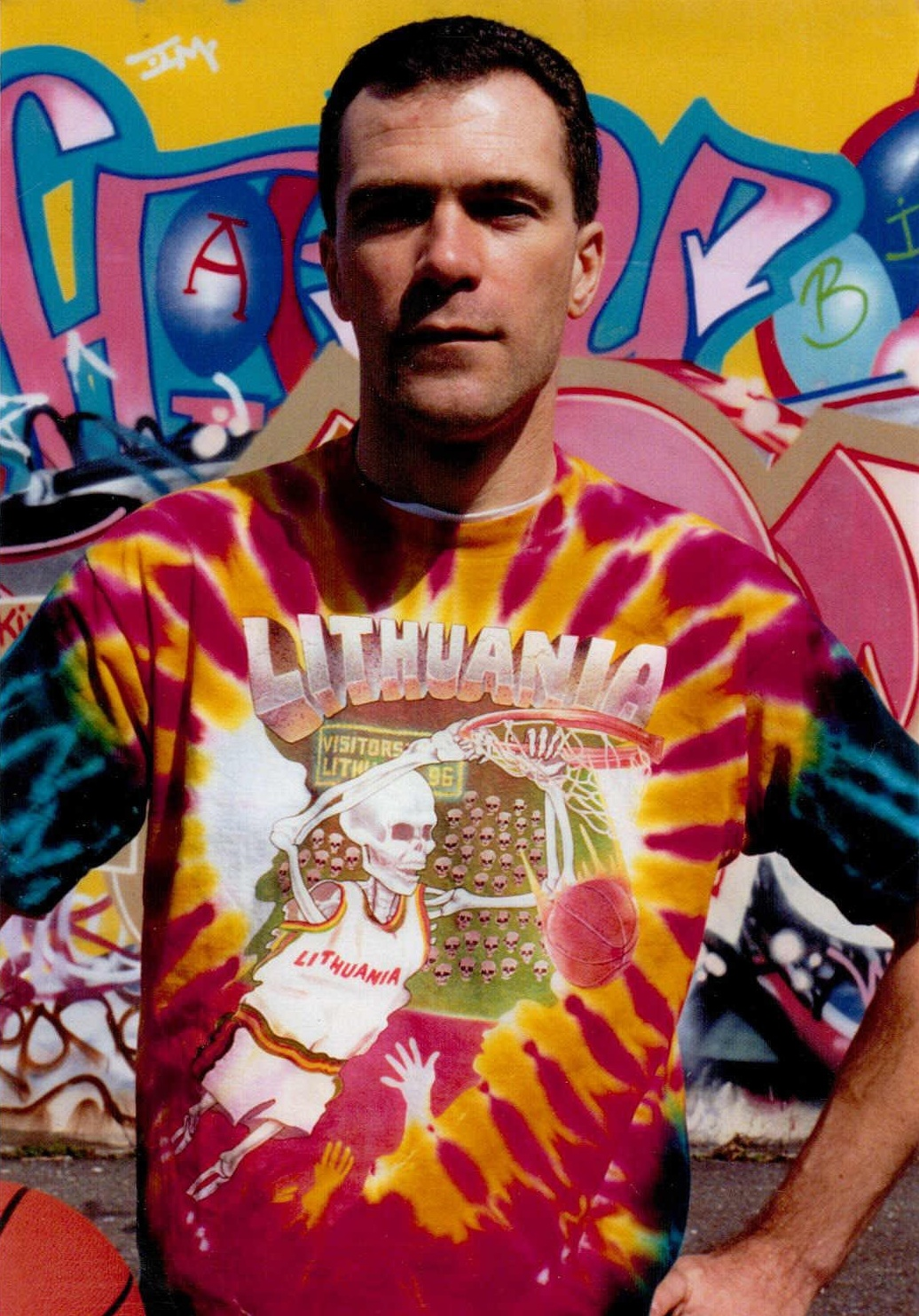
New York artist Greg Speirs wearing the "Skully" tie-dyed T-shirt which he designed and became a symbol of Lithuanian basketball

Afterwards, the country celebrated 70 years of Lithuanian basketball, and among the events was a competition featuring two Lithuanian teams, Latvia, Belarus, Finland, and Illinois State University basketball team. The superiority of the Lithuanians, now counting with Sabonis and Marčiulionis, made them handily beat the opponents. Following it, Lithuania national team was invited to compete in the prestigious annual Acropolis Tournament hosted by Greece, along with Italy and France. Lithuanians began the competition shockingly, immediately crushing the EuroBasket 1991 silver medalists Italians 116–94 (at one point leading by 87–49). Though, then they narrowly lost to the host Greece squad 81–83 and after easily defeating the French squad 109–78, took the second place. Despite not winning the cup, this was a perfect first major international challenge for the Lithuania national team, giving the solid hopes of success for the newly reborn state. Shortly before the opening of the Olympic Games, Lithuanians also overcame the Olympics host Spain 107–97 in Ibiza.

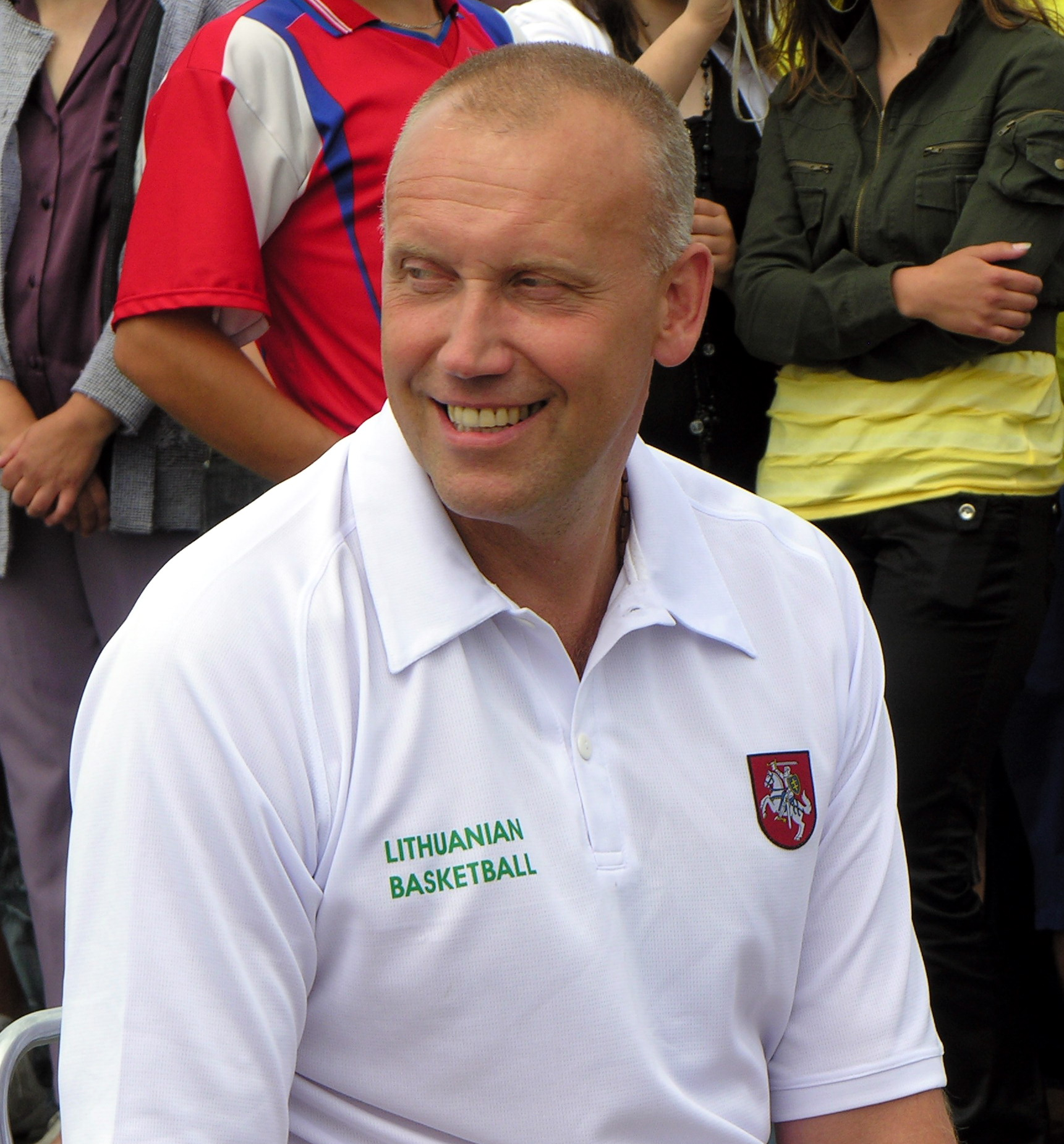
Rimas Kurtinaitis, one of the Lithuanian team leaders in 1992

Lithuania was among the many European independent states that due to the dissolutions of the Soviet Union and Yugoslavia, would return to the Olympic competition for the 1992 games. For the 1992 Pre-Olympic Basketball Tournament, held in Spain from 22 June to 5 July, Lithuania was joined by the debuting Croatia, Slovenia, Latvia, and Estonia, along with the non-Baltic Soviet republics in a Commonwealth of Independent States. The latter was a particularly awaited adversary for the Lithuanians, as according to LTOK president Artūras Poviliūnas, "We have dreamed all of our lives about playing against the Soviet Union. Although it's not called the Soviet Union any more, this game will be very important and very symbolic. It will be as important as the Olympics themselves." With a trip funded by the Spanish city of Melilla, Lithuania managed to get one of the four qualifying spots disputed by 25 participants, winning all their 11 games in the tournament.

The Olympic tournament for the Lithuania national team began against China, with an overwhelming 112–75 win that featured 31 points by Rimas Kurtinaitis (5 of 6 three-pointers). Afterwards a tough match with FIBA Americas silver medalist Venezuela had the lead frequently changing, with Lithuania depending on Marčiulionis (27 points) and Sabonis (24) to win by 87–79. The third game was easier, with the Lithuanians beating Puerto Rico 104–91, with 80 points scored by the "golden trio" Sabonis, Marčiulionis, and Kurtinaitis. Then awaited the hardest adversary in the group stage, the former USSR states in an Unified Team. Lithuania managed to beat the team during the qualifying tournament, and during the Olympics even got a 59–57 lead at the second quarter. Then the Unified Team managed to overcome its defector state and win 92–80, despite the 42-points combined efforts of Sabonis and Marčiulionis. In order to qualify for the quarterfinals, the Lithuania national team had to overcome the Australian squad. Lithuanians lost the first half 45–46, though later they mightily grabbed the lead till the end of the game, winning it 98–87 and qualifying in second place for the playoffs.

Lithuania met the respected and powerful Brazilian squad at the quarterfinals. The coaching staff decided to use only the most reliable players, with only six Lithuanians scoring. The tense game had the Brazilians leading at half-time, and Lithuania only taking full advantage with five minutes remaining: from 87 to 83, the score built up to a 114–96 Lithuanian wins. Sabonis played all the 40 game minutes and scored 32 points, while Marčiulionis added 29, and Kurtinaitis 20.

At the semifinal Lithuanians met the United States squad nicknamed "Dream Team". It was the first time the Americans brought a team composed of NBA players, including the widely regarded all-time greatest basketballer Michael Jordan, and the superiority of the "Dream Team" left the Lithuanians absolutely no chances for victory, with the Baltic state taking a lopsided 76–127. It is still the biggest loss ever suffered by the Lithuanian squad, who scored only 34.2% of their shots. The Americans still recognized that they aimed to ramp up their game specially to counter the Lithuanians, with Larry Bird acknowledging that "we knew the Lithuanians were capable of scoring, (so) we didn't take them lightly", and Magic Johnson saying that "they're a dangerous team, so we had to pick up our intensity, play better defense". Afterwards, the Lithuanian team coaches decided to start resting the primary players for the bronze medals game.

"I don't think that any American could ever possibly connect to the meaning for those people. The first moment the Lithuanian flag went up."

— Jim Lampley, a record holder of Olympic Games covered on U.S. television.

At the bronze medal game, Lithuanians faced the Unified Team for the third time that year, with each team winning once. Captain Valdemaras Chomičius felt that "We lost to them once already, we couldn't let that happen again. The final had to be ours", while Šarūnas Marčiulionis added that "We didn't have any choice, we absolutely had to win at any cost". Head coach Vladas Garastas briefed the team saying "Men, you're playing for the people of Lithuania. Forget about your personal ambitions. People are watching you, losing sleep over you". Šarūnas Marčiulionis: "Some were listening on radios, others were watching on television. All of Lithuania was stopped. Everyone was watching that game". In a close match, the Lithuanians kept the lead all times for an 82–78 victory, that felt inexpressibly remarkable for a tiny country which regained its independence just two years and was playing the remains of its former colonizer. Marčiulionis played 40 minutes during that match and scored 29 points, while Sabonis added 27. Donnie Nelson described the locker room as "like winning the NBA championship times five". After the bronze medal victory, de jure Head of State Vytautas Landsbergis visited the team at the locker room, and they all sung the national anthem.

During the awarding ceremony, Lithuanians decided to dress up the colorful Skeleton Jerseys in order to show their newly reborn country national colors and to show their gratitude to Greg Speirs and the Grateful Dead for their financial support. Rimas Kurtinaitis characterized the emotional awarding ceremony by saying: "Well, we cried. It was really from joy. Words cannot even express feelings like that. You need to be there". Valdemaras Chomičius: "It was such an emotion that it's hard to explain. You have to experience it". Arvydas Sabonis by comparing his 1988's Olympic gold medal and the 1992's Olympic bronze medal said: "The medal in Seoul was gold, but this bronze is our soul". In all, Lithuanians averaged 94 points per game in the tournament, being outclassed only by the USA (117 points per game). The team was the subject of a 2012 documentary by Marius Markevičius, The Other Dream Team.

=== EuroBasket 1995 ===
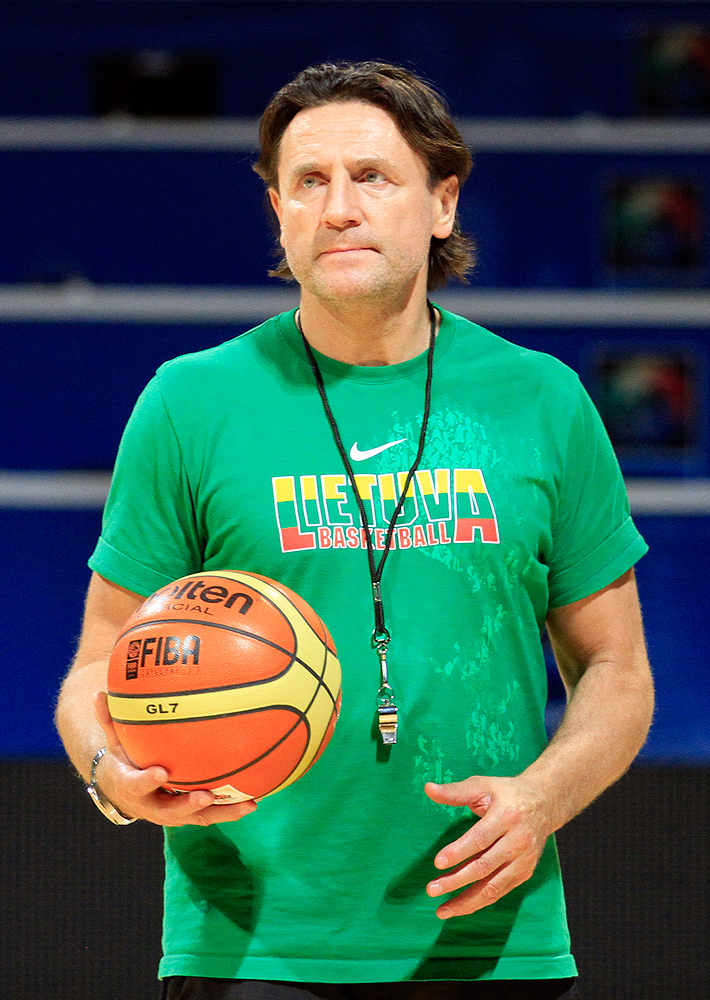
EuroBasket 1995 was the last international tournament for Olympic champion Valdemaras Chomičius.

During the qualifiers for EuroBasket 1993, Lithuanian basketball had its biggest disappointment. Missing Arvydas Sabonis but still with most of the bronze medal squad, Lithuania played in a three team group in Wrocław, and beat hosts Poland but lost to Belarus, being eliminated by the fellow former United Republic. It remains Lithuania's only absence following independence. However, this fiasco encouraged the creation of the first professional basketball league in Lithuania.

To get into EuroBasket 1995 in Greece, the Lithuanians had to go through a two-stage qualifying tournament in 1993. In 10 games, Lithuania only lost twice, to Ukraine in Vienna and Slovenia in Ljubljana. With their spot guaranteed, Lithuania started its preparations in 1995 by playing in several international competitions, winning a four-team tournament in Málaga. The last game was a friendly with the Polish in Vilnius, winning 105–84.

In its return to the European championship following years under Soviet occupation, Lithuania began the tournament powerfully, with five wins in the group stage and a defeat to Yugoslavia. They overcame the quarterfinals stage successfully as well, defeating 1994 World Championship silver medalists Russia 82–71, leading the game from start to finish. With a guaranteed spot in the tournament's top four, Lithuania was granted the right to participate in the 1996 Summer Olympics, held in Atlanta. The semifinal hurdle was overcome as well with a 90–80 defeat of the powerful Croatia, led by the two mighty centers: Stojko Vranković and Dino Rađa. The Lithuanian national team advanced into its final after 56 years, demonstrating the Lithuanian basketball's vitality and strength, in spite of all the previous difficulties.

O.A.K.A. Indoor Hall, where the EuroBasket final took place

"The ending of the game left the woeful impression. It was obvious that the judging does not fit the game-play level. FIBA got warning: the refereeing must improve or the basketball will face degradation." — C. Jimenez, B. Jimenez

The final was a rematch with Yugoslavia. The tense finale, where Lithuania had the support of the home crowd as the Serbs had eliminated Greece, had Lithuania winning the close first half, 49–48. With five minutes remaining, Arvydas Sabonis fouled out, as the Lithuanians were behind 76–83, later closing to 83–84. With Yugoslavia leading 87–83, Saulius Štombergas made a shot that was ruled out as the referee George Toliver called an offensive foul. Lithuanians protested the decision and received three technical fouls (first Sabonis, then Marčiulionis and then the whole team), leading them to leave the court in protest, only returning when persuaded by the Serbs. Aleksandar Đorđević, the game's overall top scorer with 41 points, scored all three free-throws. Lithuania eventually lost the game 90–96. After the final whistle, Greek fans shouted "Lithuania is the champion" and booed Yugoslavia during the medal ceremony, which also had the third-placed Croatians leaving for the Yugoslavs – who were still waging a war against Croatia. Marčiulionis, who was named tournament MVP, later stated that "we felt robbed and we still feel that", while acknowledging that despite the questionable refereeing, the silver medal came due to a lack of depth in the Lithuanian bench along with the Yugoslavs knowing "how to provoke other players and initiate psychological battles".

=== 1996 Atlanta Summer Olympics ===
In preparation for another Olympic tournament, Lithuania played five games in Australia against the "Australian Boomers", with a team composed mostly of young players as veterans Sabonis, Marčiulionis, and Karnišovas were unable to participate. Lithuania lost the entire series, but the experience against Australia would be useful in the future. Once they returned to Europe, the Lithuanians played a few games in Spain, losing twice to strong and spirited Croatia and beating twice Africa champions Angola. Once Sabonis returned for a friendly with Yugoslavia in Germany, he scored 32 points in Lithuania's win by 86–70.

The Lithuanian basketball started well its second Olympiad, beating 1992 Olympic vice-champions Croatia – led by Toni Kukoč, Stojko Vranković, and Dino Rađa – 83–81 in a tough match with two overtimes. Exhausted and facing an Argentinian team focused on adversary slowdown, Lithuania lost its second game 61–65. Facing the host United States supported by 31,000 spectators, Lithuania suffered the absence of an injured Marciulionis and lesser contributions by Sabonis and Kurtinaitis, and lost 82–104. However, wins in the final games against Angola (85–49) and China (116–55) qualified Lithuania at second place.

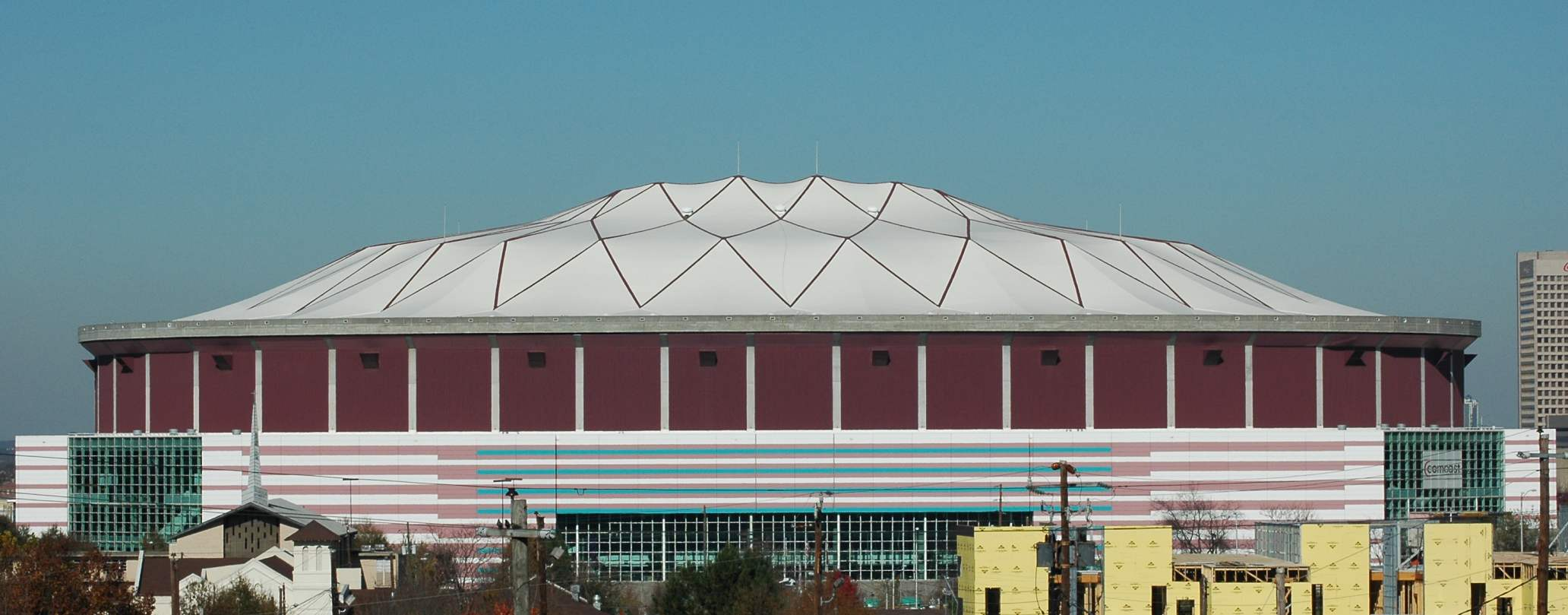
In 1996, Lithuanians were awarded their second consecutive Olympic bronze medals at the Georgia Dome.

The Olympic quarterfinal game had Lithuania crushing its third straight adversary against Greece, 99–66. The Olympic semifinal match awaited with powerhouse Yugoslavia, undefeated that far and inspiring the Lithuanians to avenge the 1995 EuroBasket final. They began the game with the lead of 18–9, though Yugoslavians won the quarter 35–31. With the five minutes remaining, Lithuanians had the lead of 54–51, then the game tied (58–58); however, during the last three match minutes Lithuanians scored none, losing the game 58–66. Another chance of an Olympic final was lost.

Only the game for the second consecutive bronze remained for the Lithuanian squad, against the Australians who sought their first Olympic medal. Lithuanians were exhausted after the tedious semifinal, and the game remained tight, with the lead never getting over 8 points and the score at 73–72 with one minute remaining. Still, a three-point shot by Arvydas Sabonis with 30 seconds remaining helped Lithuania retain advantage, eventually triumphing 84–74. Sabonis was the driving force of the bronze medal game, neutralizing defender Mark Bradtke on the way to 30 points, 13 rebounds, 3 assists and 5 blocks. Another Olympic medal proved Lithuania was among the top basketball countries. The game marked the last time Sabonis and Marčiulionis played together, as the latter retired from the national team, and also the final match with head coach Vladas Garastas. A generational change was to come.

=== EuroBasket 1997 ===
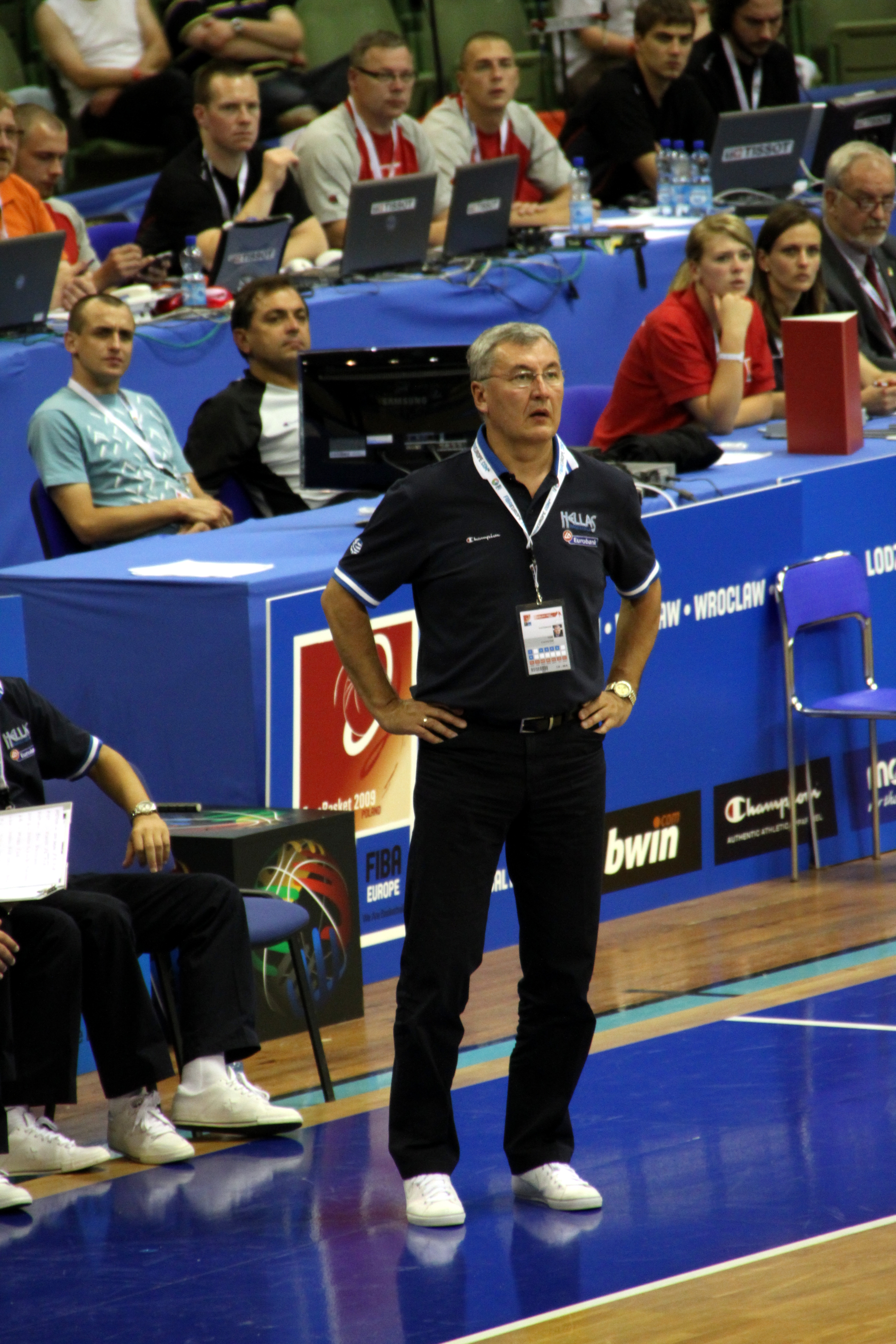
Jonas Kazlauskas debuted as the head coach of the Lithuania men's national team in 1997.

While selecting its squad for the 30th European Championship in Barcelona, Lithuania retained only two primary players from the 1995 silver medalists: Artūras Karnišovas and Gintaras Einikis. The so-called "golden generation" was replaced by up-and-coming youngsters such as Šarūnas Jasikevičius, Dainius Adomaitis, Virginijus Praškevičius, and Eurelijus Žukauskas. Furthermore, Jonas Kazlauskas took over as coach. The newly put together team was constantly causing anxiety if it would keep up with previous successful performances by Lithuanians. Hopes were restored once Lithuania won a four-team tournament in Riga and beat Spain in Zaragoza.

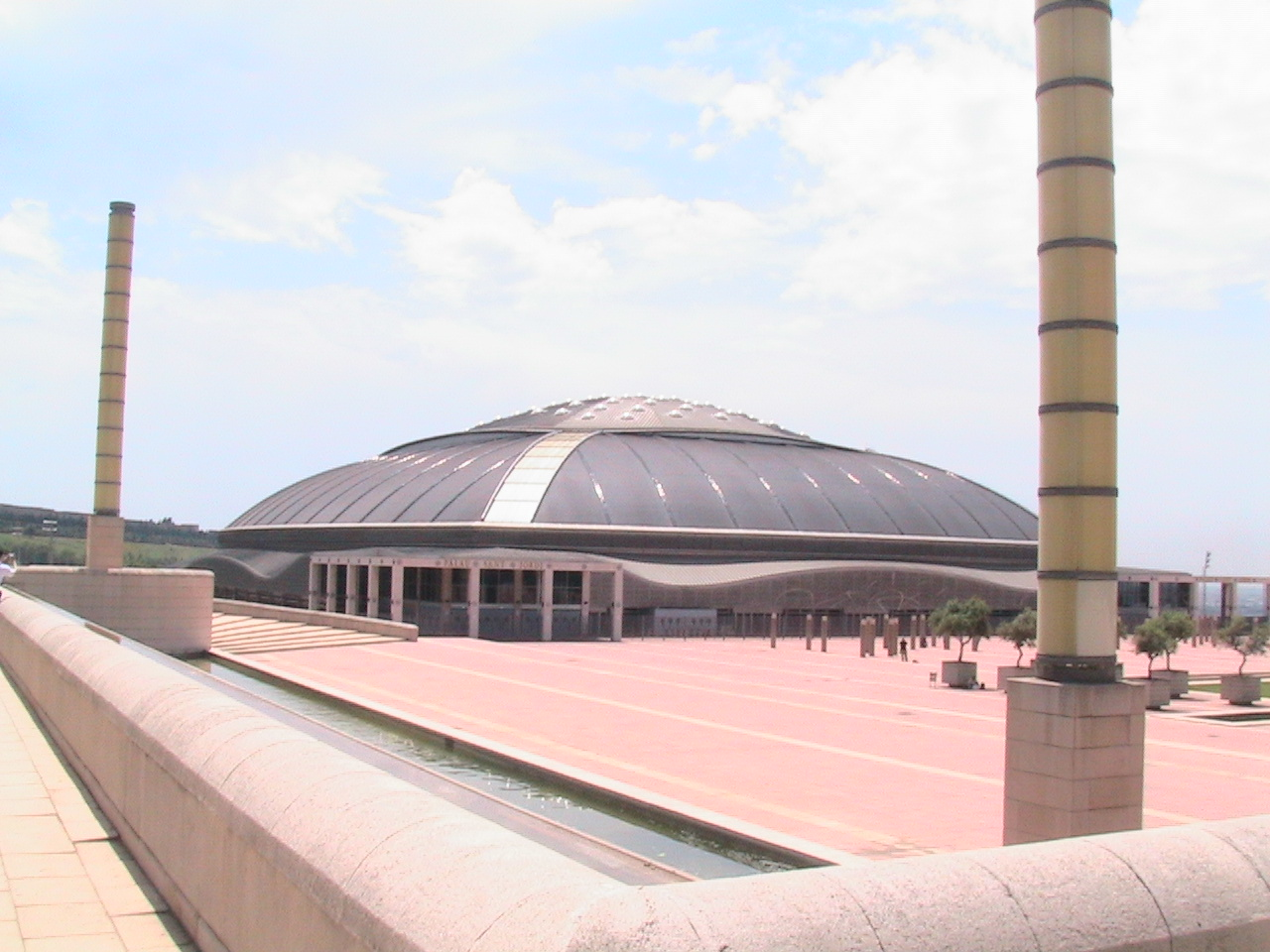
Palau Sant Jordi hosted the quarterfinals where the young Lithuanian national team failed to overcome the powerful Yugoslavians.

The EuroBasket 1997 championship had extra significance for Lithuania as it gave qualifying spots for the 1998 FIBA World Championship, held in Athens, Greece. Lithuania managed to win all games in the group stage, albeit struggling with both Israel – who lead at halftime by 30–31, but wound up losing 75–60 – and France – who managed to take the lead thrice before bowing down to Lithuania 94–88 – before an easy 76–67 defeat of Slovenia. The second round lead to tougher times to the Lithuanians, winning only against Turkey while losing to Greece and Russia. The poor performance lead them to face defending champions Yugoslavia, who beat Lithuania 75–60 on the way to another title.

Due to the poor performance in the second round, Lithuanians were forced to take on the terrific Yugoslavia national team (the upcoming champions) in the quarterfinals, losing 60–75. With only the consolation tournament left, Lithuania crushed the Polish squad 76–55, but lost to the host team Spain during the final seconds, 93–94. The final standing of sixth was enough for a World Championship spot, and helped the young Lithuanian team to lay the foundations for the future victories.

=== FIBA World Championship 1998 ===
As usually, by preparing for the significant championship, the Lithuania national team played a wide variety of games and tournaments. A small championship in Nicosia, Cyprus, had Lithuania beating Nigeria before losing to the upcoming world championship host Greece 68–82. A friendly with Spain in Seville had the Lithuanians defeated, 62–66. Lithuania also participated in the 1998 Goodwill Games basketball tournament in New York City, along with the United States, Argentina, Brazil, Australia, Russia and Puerto Rico. In the first round, the Lithuania national team overcame Russia and Argentina, but lost to Australia and took the second spot in the group. Consequently, they had to play the United States in the semifinal, losing it 76–89. Though, they took third place after smashing the Puerto Ricans 119–75.

Debuting in its first FIBA World Championship with a young roster, the Lithuania national team was determined to cause a good impression. The team went undefeated in the group stage, crushing South Korea 97–56 before beating a United States team lacking the NBA elite due to a lockout (84–82), and a close defeat of Brazil, 66–62. The second round was tougher for Lithuania, who lost to Australia 61–71, and despite beating Argentina 84–75, wound up losing in overtime to Spain, 80–86. A quarterfinal against Russia ensued, and while the Lithuanians had beaten them two weeks before and lead the game 38–35 at halftime, the Russians beat the inexperienced team by 82–67. Following the consolation tournament with a loss to Italy and a win over Argentina, Lithuania finished in seventh place. The equal games and especially the victory over the United States were promising for the young Lithuanian squad.

=== EuroBasket 1999 ===
Preparation for the European championship began in a usual way: after intense practicing, the Lithuanians participated in minor competitions, winning two tournaments (in Helsinki and Kaunas), to go to the European championship with elation.

Lithuania qualified for EuroBasket 1999 in France losing only two out of ten games, to Croatia and Bosnia and Herzegovina. The tournament started with a surprise, as an underdog Czech Republic beat Lithuania 78–62. Afterwards, the team found its stride and won the five following games in the first and second rounds. Reaching the knockout rounds, Lithuanians were favorites against Spain, but lost by a close 74–72 score. Two wins in the consolation tournament gave Lithuania the fifth place and a qualifying spot for the 2000 Summer Olympics. EuroBasket 1999 was the last time the Lithuanian national team counted with Arvydas Sabonis and Artūras Karnišovas. Though, the solid performances by the young Saulius Štombergas and Šarūnas Jasikevičius gave a bright outset for their future.

=== 2000 Sydney Summer Olympics ===
Lithuania started the 2000s by beating Turkey 70–58 in Vilnius. During the preparation period Lithuanians once again visited Spain, defeating the hosts in two preparatory tournaments.

The 2000 Olympic tournament marked another time of renovation for Lithuania. The only veterans, Saulius Štombergas and Eurelijus Žukauskas, were reserves in Atlanta, while eight players were debutants: Ramūnas Šiškauskas, Darius Songaila, Šarūnas Jasikevičius, Mindaugas Timinskas, Andrius Giedraitis, Kęstutis Marčiulionis, Darius Maskoliūnas and Tomas Masiulis. The coaching staff was also inexperienced in the Olympics aside from assistants Valdemaras Chomičius and Donnie Nelson.

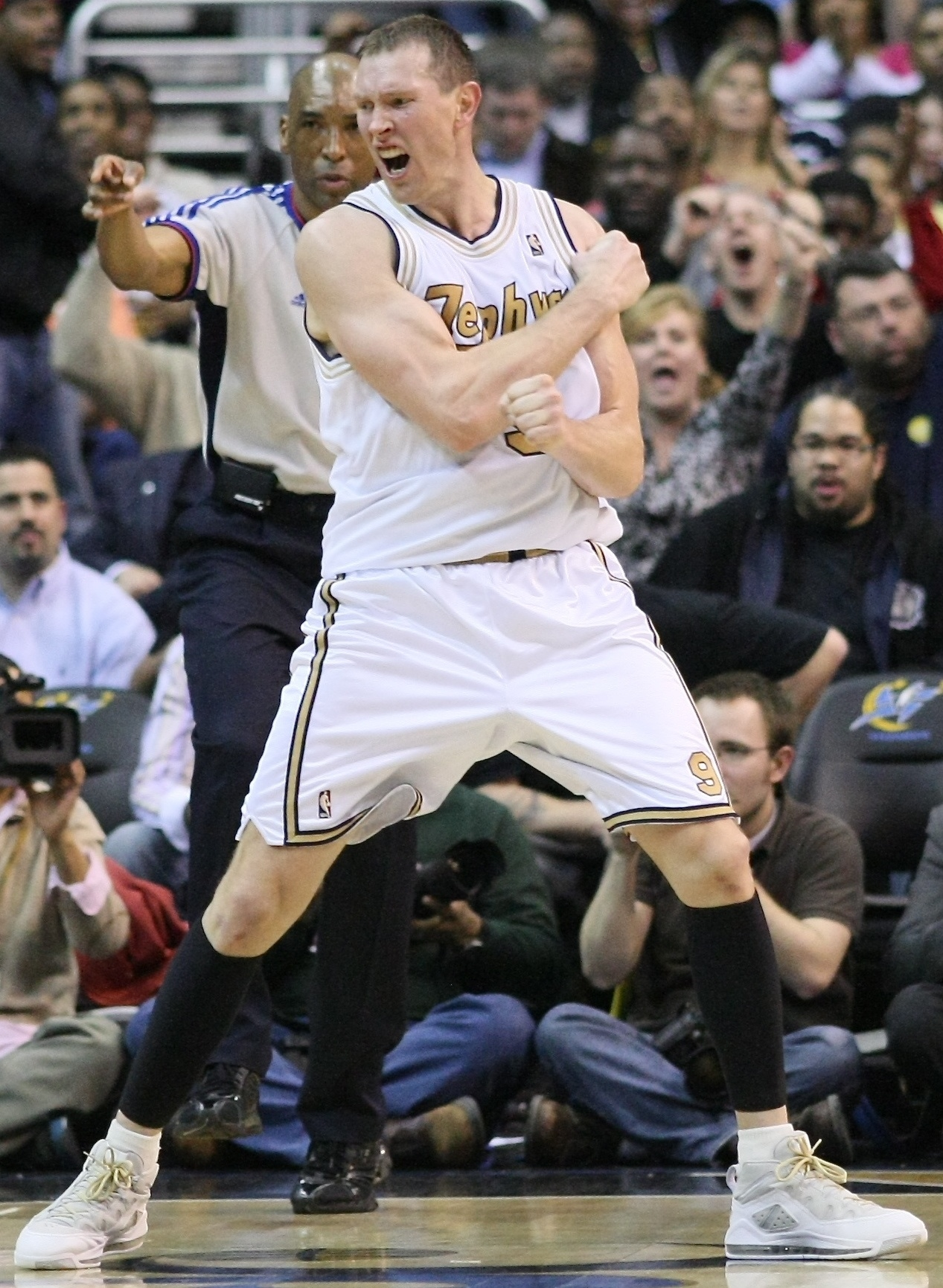
Darius Songaila, one of the Lithuanian national team's leaders, during his debut years in 2000

The first Olympic game against Italy had both teams combined scoring less than 100 points, with Lithuania losing 48–50. The young Lithuanians managed to recover, beating upcoming Olympic vice-champions France 81–63. Journalist Roma Grinbergienė described the triumph symbolically and picturesquely: "Even the Vytautas the Great would accolade!". The third game, against the third incarnation of the United States "Dream Team", had the Lithuanians giving the Americans their toughest match since NBA players joined: the final score of 85–76 had Team USA's lowest point total and advantage with professionals, and the Lithuanians even got the lead in the second quarter. Onwards, Lithuania overcame China 82–66 and New Zealand 85–75, and finished third in their group.

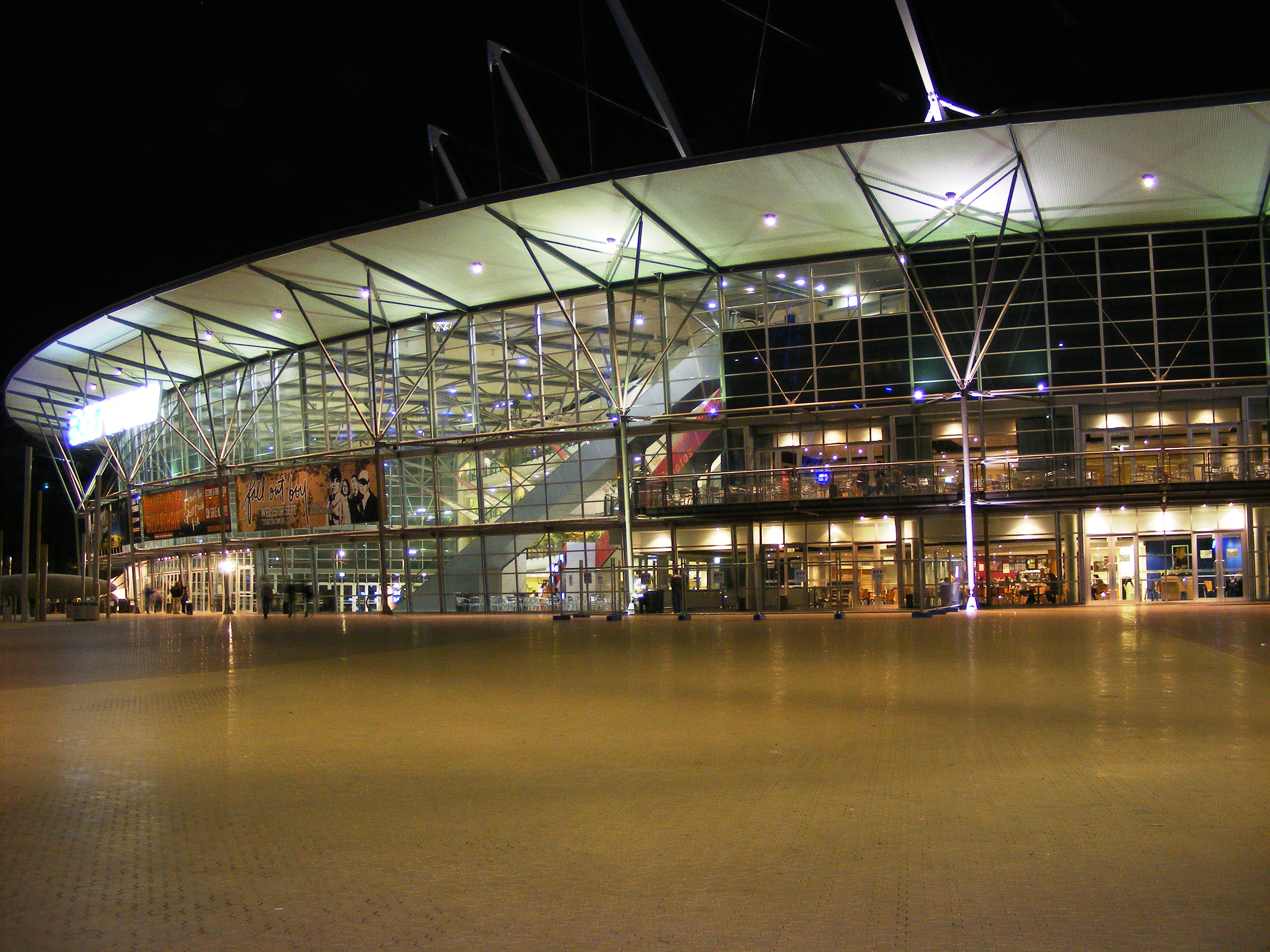
Lithuania nearly beat the "Dream Team" at Sydney Superdome.

The quarterfinal opponent was one Lithuania could not defeat in previous years, Yugoslavia. The start was anxious as Lithuanians were trailing 8–2, but not for long. Yugoslavians resisted only until three minutes were left, with Lithuania already leading the game 72–58. Then nobody doubted – the quarterfinal winner is Lithuania, officially winning the game 76–63. Head coach Jonas Kazlauskas: "Winning against the Yugoslavian team and its coach is every team and every coach dream. We are even more happy that we won in the quarterfinal. The gulf is separating the quarterfinal winner teams from the losers. We played very orderly, probably the most disciplined in this tournament. We defended well. Furthermore, Gintaras Einikis and Šarūnas Jasikevičius played amazingly". Lithuania was to compete for another Olympic medal, to the happiness of all their fans.

Although, the Lithuania national team coaches had no time to rejoice. The USA Dream Team was awaiting once again in the semifinal. Millions of the basketball fans were surprised there. The USA won the first quarter 48–36, but 5 minutes into the second Lithuania had tied 50–50. Then none of the teams allowed to advance any further for the each other. The main events were happening when there was only a bit less than 2 minutes remaining. When there was 1:36 left, the Lithuania was leading 80–79, then the game tied again (80–80). Ramūnas Šiškauskas got to shoot three free-throws, converting only one (81–80). Quickly Vince Carter gives back the advantage to the Americans, Kevin Garnett misses two free throws, and a successful US rebound leads Antonio McDyess to make Lithuania trail 81–84 with 25 seconds left. Šarūnas Jasikevičius makes two free-throws (83–84). Šiškauskas fouls with five seconds left. Jason Kidd converts only one free-throw (83–85). A last second long shot by Šarūnas Jasikevičius is an air ball, and the "Dream Team" managed its smallest victory ever with 85–83. Lithuania lost, but American coach Rudy Tomjanovich praised the adversary, stating that the Lithuanians "played focused and played the high level basketball. At the end, they were unlucky to make a few free-throws." The United States also widely covered how the small nation nearly upset a team that seemed previously unbeatable in previous tournaments.

For the third time, only a bronze medal was possible for Lithuania. Despite the psychological damage of the defeat and having to face hosts Australia in the third place match, the Lithuanians played well enough to win again. Having the experience of playing the Boomers earlier in the year, Lithuania had a strong defensive strategy, and combined with a helped by a shooting percentage of 67%, never gave up the lead on the way to an 89–71 victory, winning their third consecutive Olympic bronze medal. Coach Kazlauskas was happy with the result, given the squad was young and "didn't let down the lath lower than it was raised."

=== EuroBasket 2001 ===
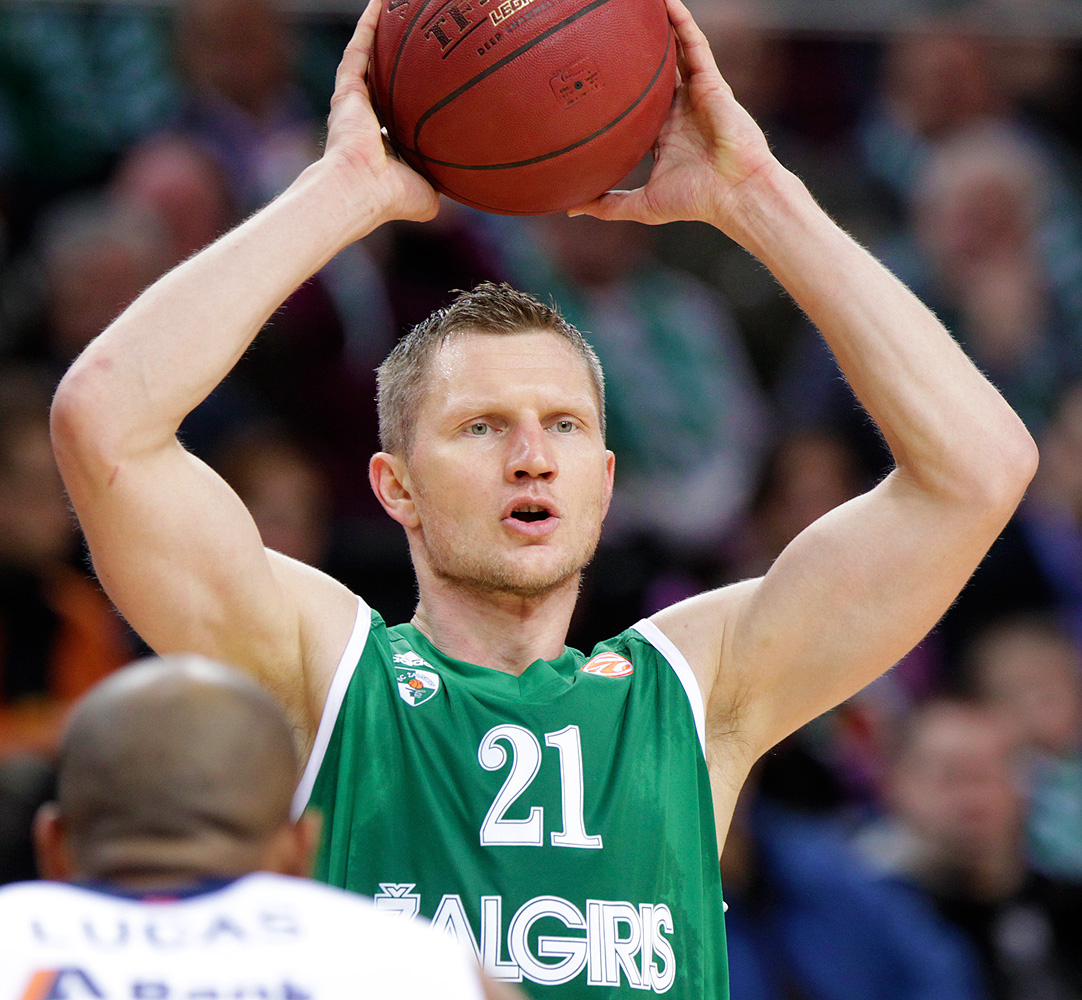
Rimantas Kaukėnas had a tough debut, during a disastrous Eurobasket 2001 campaign.

The start of a new millennium. Another European Championship, held in Turkey, awaited Lithuania in the autumn. While most of the 2000 roster was returning, many up-and-coming stars such as Šarūnas Jasikevičius, Ramūnas Šiškauskas, Darius Songaila, Rimantas Kaukėnas and Robertas Javtokas would make their debut. To prepare for the championship and give international experience to the young players, Lithuania participated in many prestigious competitions in Europe and South America. In Braunschweig, Germany, Lithuania achieved the third place among the four very capable teams (Yugoslavia, France and Germany). Then the Lithuanian squad played for the first time in South America, taking part in a four team tournament in Argentina's capital Buenos Aires. Lithuania won two games, including its 500th international victory against Brazil (the last 100 in just 4 years), but only finished second after losing to the hosts Argentina 56–67. Lithuania also competed in the Acropolis Tournament for the second time after nine years, this time losing twice and finished fourth.

EuroBasket 2001 ended as an unexpected failure to Lithuania. The group stage started with two victories, 82–60 over Ukraine and 68–59 with Israel, before losing to France 65–76. A match against fellow Balts Latvians would give a spot in the knockout stages. And there Lithuania suffered an unexpected and overwhelming defeat to the Latvians, 64–94. By falling so early, Lithuania lost all the chances of participating in the 2002 FIBA World Championship, and was threatened to miss the next EuroBasket as well. The disappointment made head coach Jonas Kazlauskas resign.

=== EuroBasket 2003 ===
Due to the fiasco in EuroBasket 2001, Lithuania did not have a direct spot on EuroBasket 2003, held in Sweden, and had to take part in the qualification tournament in 2002. They easily granted a ticket into the continental championship tournament, winning all 10 qualifying games.

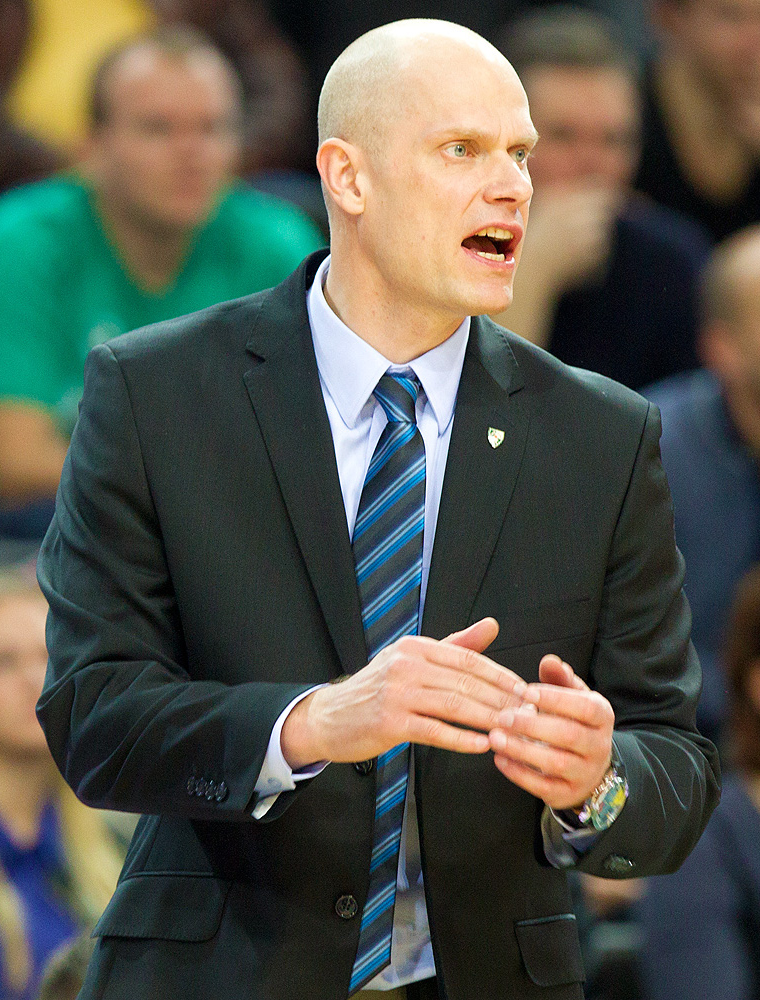
Saulius Štombergas, the captain of the Lithuania national team in 2003

The renewed Lithuania basketball team, full of motivation and energy, that would go to Sweden, was led by Šarūnas Jasikevičius, Arvydas Macijauskas, Ramūnas Šiškauskas and Saulius Štombergas. Again preparations lead to friendlies and international tournaments, losing only to France and Spain in their respective countries. EuroBasket itself opened against neighbour Latvia, responsible for the painful 2001 elimination. The game, once again, was going remarkably poorly for Lithuania. They firmly lost the first quarter (14–23), remained trailing by halftime (34–40) and only managed to tie by the third (58–58). At the fourth quarter, Latvians still had the lead of 66–58, when with 23 seconds remaining, Eurelijus Žukauskas tied the game (81–81) and forced overtime. The extra period had Lithuania guarantee a 92–91 victory with four seconds to go, after Šarūnas Jasikevičius made two free-throws. Despite the difficult start, then Lithuanians showed a much improved game in the following group stage matches, overcoming Israel (94–62) and Germany (93–71).

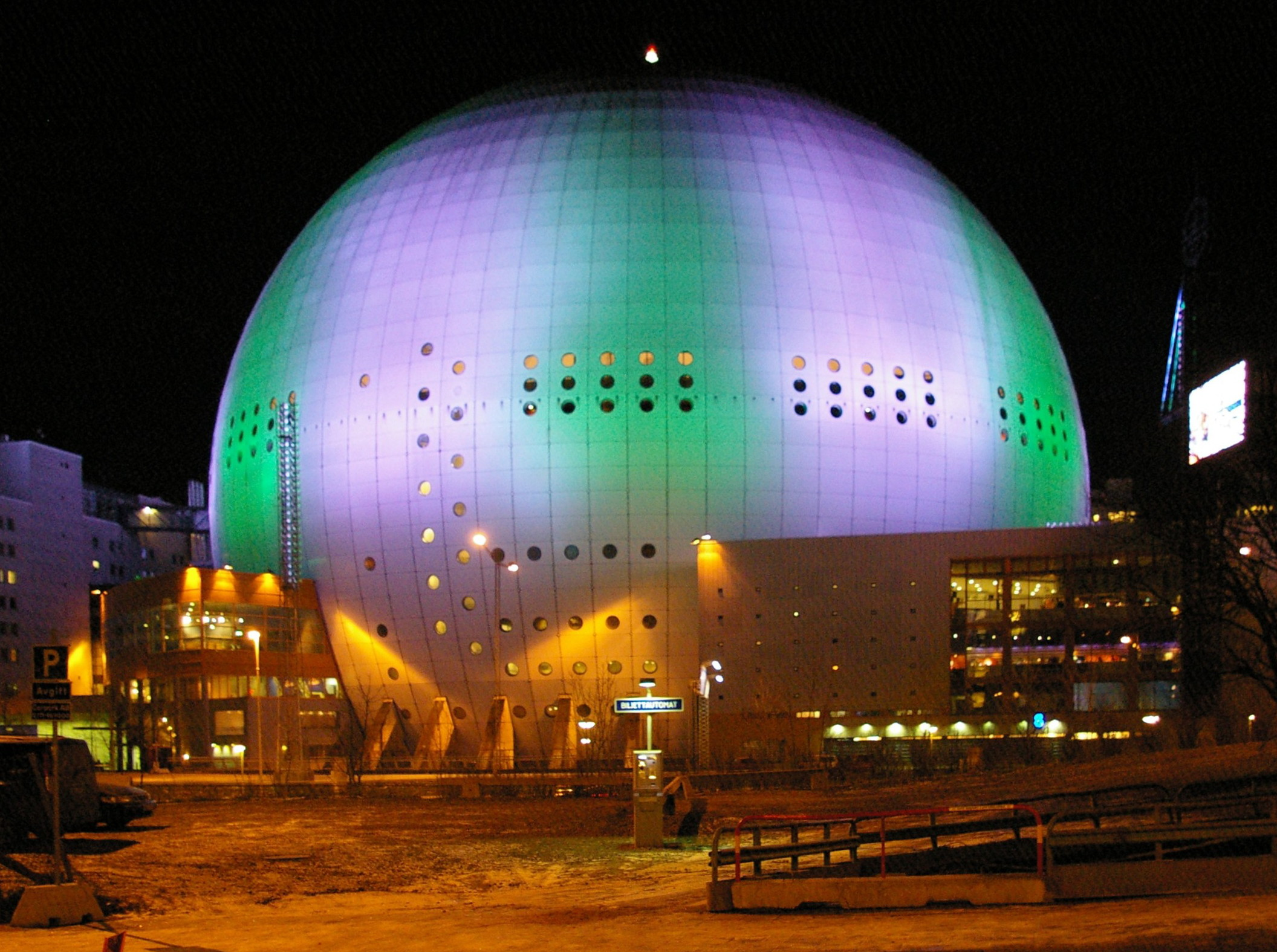
Stockholm Globe Arena, the ball-shaped arena where one of the biggest Lithuanian basketball victories was achieved.

Concerns were raised once defending World and European champions Serbia and Montenegro (former Yugoslavia) were set as the quarterfinal opponents. The Lithuanians still prevailed, already achieving a 30–19 advantage in the first quarter (30–19), and never giving any chances in a 98–82 victory. Serbian coach Božidar Maljković followed the match by saying that "Lithuania plays the best team-play in this championship. The victory over Serbia was a splendid result achieved by the tremendous players, capable of playing like a sustainable derivative. <...> Lithuanians are playing fast, interesting and tactically matured basketball. The game is the best I have observed in this championship. By game-play, Lithuania is only worth gold".

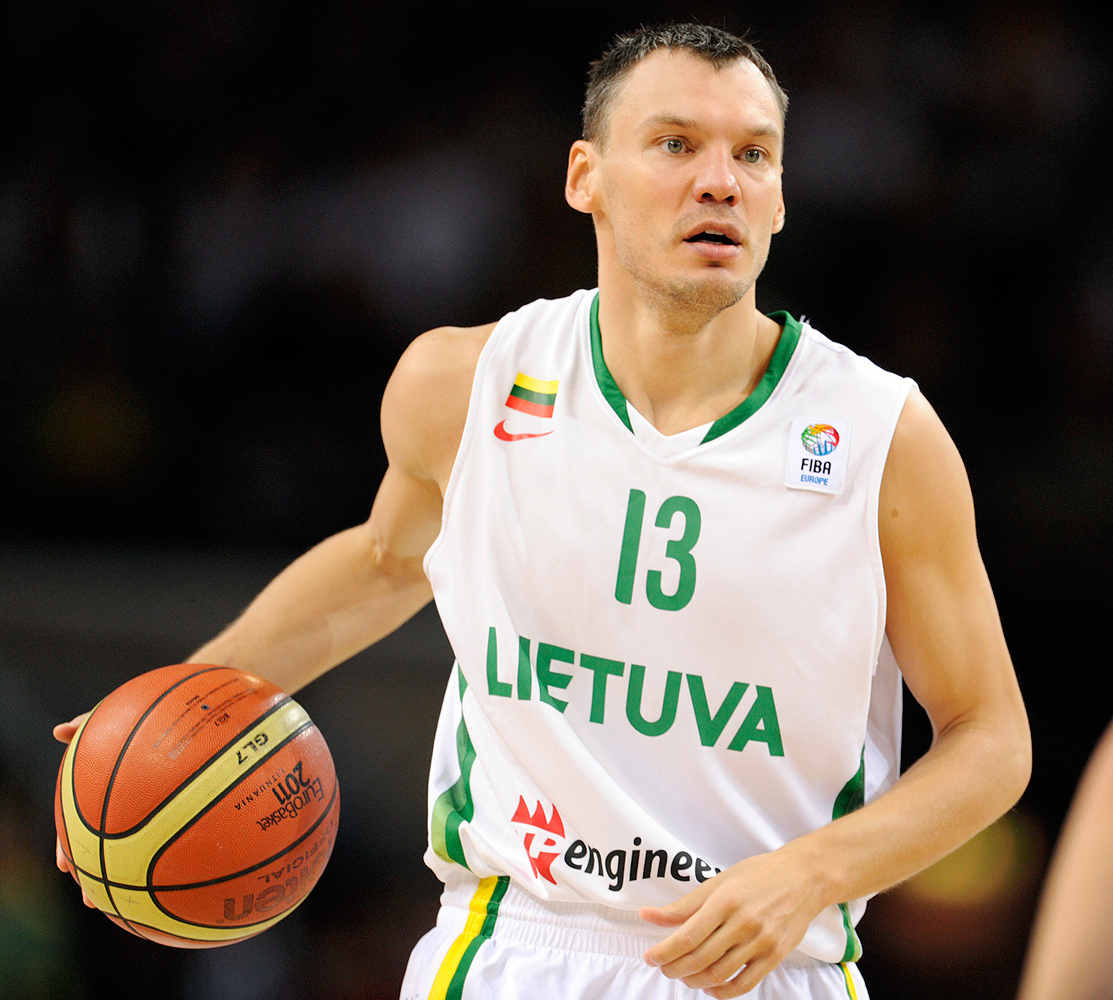
Šarūnas Jasikevičius was the MVP of EuroBasket 2003.

Semifinals against France were next. Lithuanians won the first three quarters, and then in the last one the French squad came in ahead (60–58), and were leading by 70–65 with three minutes remaining. More struggles later, Lithuania were ahead, 72–70, with 15 seconds remaining. A final attack by the French NBA star Tony Parker was stopped by Ramūnas Šiškauskas, who added two more free throw points and gave the Neman river nation their fourth EuroBasket final ever, as well as an automatic spot in the 2004 Summer Olympics.

Exhausted by the game versus France, the Lithuanians still had to prove themselves in the final against Spain. And while the first quarter was played equally (20–19), afterwards the Lithuanians dominated and never gave the Spanish any chance. Lithuania won their third European title 93–84 after a 64-year hiatus. Šarūnas Jasikevičius was named MVP, and was included along with Saulius Štombergas in the All-Tournament Team.

The word about the Lithuanians triumph spread wide. The defeated Spanish of El Mundo considered that "the good Spanish mood, accuracy and the joy of the game evaporated in front of the Lithuania national team victory desire", and El Periódico de Catalunya added that "when Lithuania was leading 62–48, what the Spanish players wished the most was to end the game and to head into the locker rooms just to finish this suffering." In Italy, Tuttosport described the victorious squad as "a true Lithuania national team. Without NBA stars.", while La Gazzetta dello Sport noted how "there is no other country in the Old Europe which would love the venerable, precious basketball more."

The ten-year anniversary of the title was celebrated on 14 September 2013, at Žalgiris Arena. The EuroBasket 2003 winners, except for Kšyštof Lavrinovič and Giedrius Gustas, played a friendly game against a team of European stars, most of whom were also in that tournament. The Lithuanians led by Arvydas Macijauskas won 85:68.

=== 2004 Athens Summer Olympics ===
In preparation for the Olympics, Lithuania lost to Italy twice while defeating France, Greece and Czech Republic along the way. The most impressive victory in the preparation for the games was achieved in the traditional Acropolis Tournament, where the Lithuanians managed to become champions in their fourth appearance, with wins over Italy and Brazil and a defeat to the host Greece. Lithuania also finished second in the six-team Golden Ball competition held in Belgrade, losing to the home team of Serbia. The last preparation games were two matches in Spain, and a win against Sweden in Vilnius.

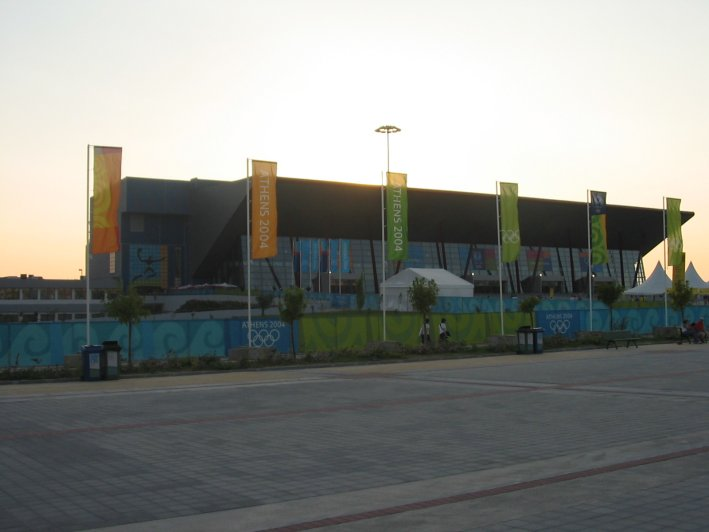
Hellinikon Olympic Arena, where the Lithuanian national team recorded their first Olympic victory against the USA.

For the fourth post-independence Olympics, basketball captain Saulius Štombergas was given the honor to bear the Lithuanian flag during the opening ceremony. The Olympic basketball for Lithuania started slowly, laboring to a victory against the African champions Angola 78–63, with their opponents shooting an excellent 52% from the three-point line. Lithuanian national team also had difficulties with Puerto Rico, depending on a high average of three-pointers to beat the NBA-heavy squad by 98–90. Then Lithuanians, in front of 12,000 spectators, achieved revenge against their Greek hosts, defeating them 98–76. The next match would be against the United States, which again featured major NBA stars such as Allen Iverson, Tim Duncan, and LeBron James, but had already been proven as faltering following a defeat to Puerto Rico. Lithuania managed to beat the United States 94–90, only the fourth defeat by the Americans in the Olympic stage. Jasikevičius, who had lost a possible buzzer beater against the Dream Team four years before, managed to score 28 points, including a decisive 10-point barrage in 69 seconds that gave Lithuania the lead in the final minutes. While the fifth game, versus Australia, was not significant for the group standings as the Lithuanians had already secured the first spot in the group, the Lithuanians still won 100–85, maintaining their good run.

In the quarterfinals Lithuanians easily swept China 95–75, successfully qualifying for the semifinals. The familiar Italian team awaited in the semifinals. Lithuania started well, winning the first quarter 29–17, and leading 34–23 in the second. However, the Italians managed to take the lead before half time and a close game ensued. Lithuanians were able to tie the game in the third quarter (53–53) and even take the lead in the fourth (78–73); however, at the buzzer the Italians celebrated a 91–100 victory, shattering the Lithuanian dream of Olympic gold.

Seeking a fourth bronze medal, Lithuania would again face the United States. The game was a close affair, with the lead changing hands nine times and both teams attempting as many three-point shots as possible (Lithuania converted 21 of their 37 shots, and the United States had 8 out of 18). At half time, the United States were ahead 49–44, after the third quarter they maintained their advantage 74–71. In the final quarter, Lithuania closed in to 83–82 in the 34th minute, before the Americans took their stand and kept the lead to the end, winning the match 104–96 and leaving the Lithuanians without Olympic medals for the first time.

=== EuroBasket 2005 ===
Robertas Javtokas, one of the Lithuanian squad leaders in 2005

EuroBasket 2005 in Serbia and Montenegro would feature many absences in the Lithuanian squad, such as Šarūnas Jasikevičius, Saulius Štombergas, Arvydas Macijauskas, and Donatas Slanina. Though, the team had Ramūnas Šiškauskas, one of the biggest European stars of that time. For preparation, the Lithuanian team attended tournaments in Europe, Asia and Australia, being represented in some of them by the reserve roster – such as in the 2005 Stanković Continental Champions' Cup in Beijing, which the Lithuanians won after defeating 4 of the 5 opponents. On 1 September 2005, a friendly with Ireland had Lithuania achieve the 600th victory in the team's history, 97–62 in Kaunas.

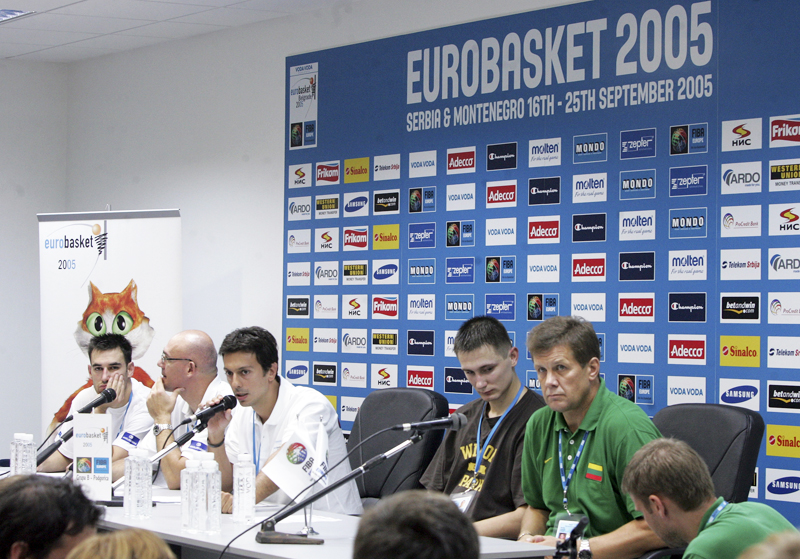
Croatia and Lithuania in a post-game press conference in 2005

Starting the tournament as defending champions, Lithuania proved their favoritism by beating Turkey, Croatia and Bulgaria with solid differences and an average of 88 points. However, the knockout rounds had the team eliminated with an underwhelming performance, scoring only 47 points in a quarterfinal with France. National team coach Antanas Sireika said: "We played the worst game in the championship and I think that the main reason of this is that the players failed to deal with the psychological tension. This is the main losing reason". The only consolation was the remaining opportunity to qualify into the World Championship, which the Lithuanians achieved by beating Russia and Slovenia for fifth place. Lithuania won 5 of 6 games in the tournament. Consequently, the competition scheme was questioned in its reliability.

=== FIBA World Championship 2006 ===
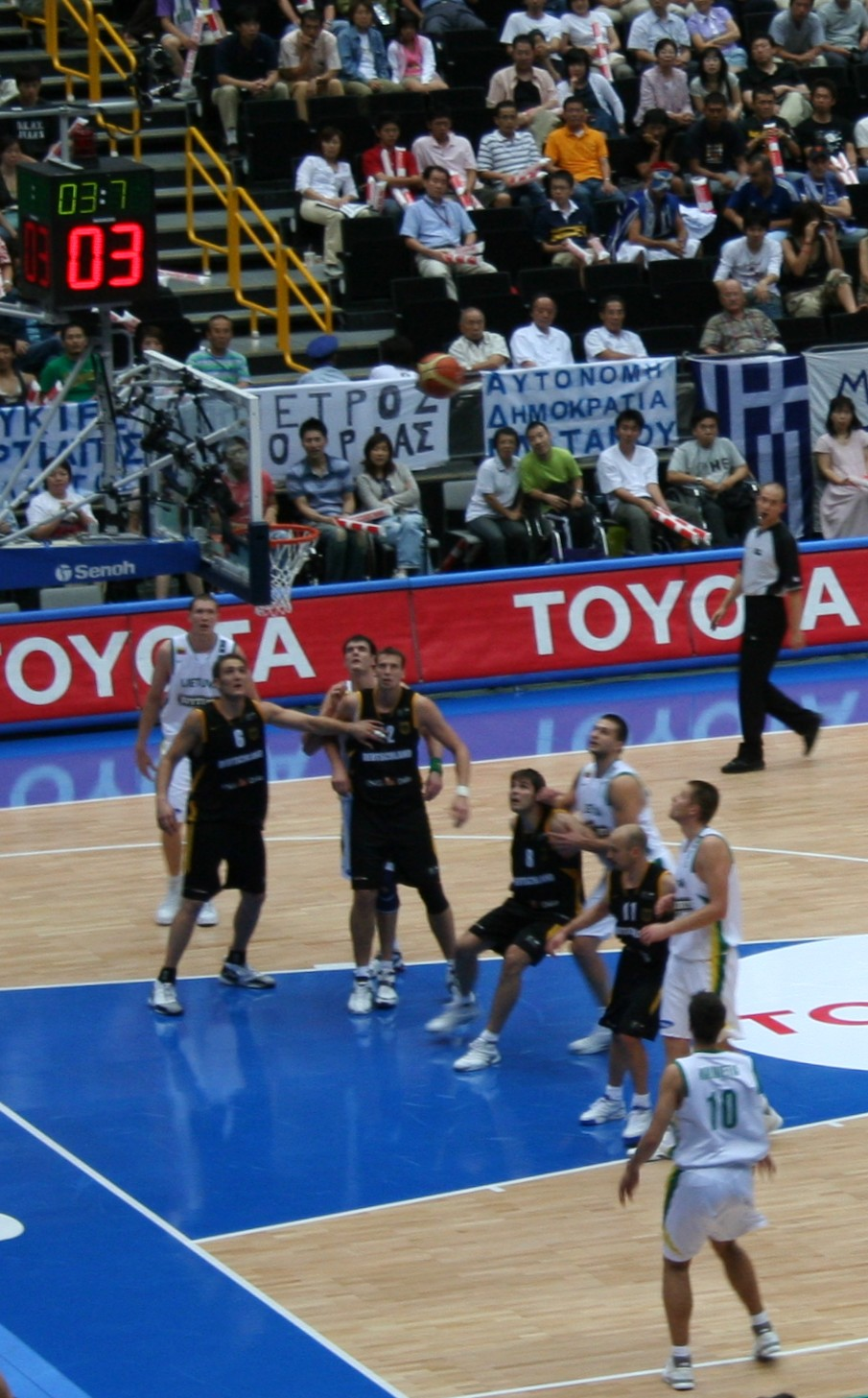
Lithuania-Germany game

The 2006 FIBA World Championship in Japan had Lithuania matching the seventh place from their 1998 debut, but many saw this performance as an under-achievement. Lithuania started the tournament with a narrow two-point loss to Turkey, followed by an overtime defeat to eventual finalists Greece which had Lithuania suffering 25 turnovers. Confidence was restored with wins over Qatar, Australia, and Brazil, that qualified Lithuania for the knockout rounds against Italy. They won the match by three points 71–68, although Arvydas Macijauskas fouled Gianluca Basile during a 3-point attempt in the dying seconds which gave Italy the chance to level the score, but all three free throws were missed. Lithuania lost the quarterfinal match against eventual champions Spain by 22 points, conceding a total of 28 turnovers during the game. The consolation tournament began with another defeat: Lithuania lost a 12-point lead over Turkey in the last 3minutes of regulation, and the resulting overtime had Turkey achieving a 95–84 victory. Lithuania still won the seventh place match against Germany, 77–62. Sireika resigned soon after the championship. On 28 December 2006, Ramūnas Butautas, son of Stepas Butautas, was announced as the new coach of the team.

=== EuroBasket 2007 ===
EuroBasket 2007 in Spain held big responsibilities for Lithuania, that had to prove the failure in the previous continental tournament passed, while holding higher stakes for Olympic qualifying, restricted to only the medallists. The first international friendly of the year was played in the newly built Šiauliai Arena, the first time the Lithuanian team played in their "Sun City". Though, the debut ended up with a big surprise, as the visiting Swedish won 69–62. Further preparation games were variable for Lithuania as well, losing to Latvia and Spain as visitors while defeating Russia in Vilnius. A fifth Acropolis Tournament had Lithuania again getting second place after losing to the Greek hosts.

"We were controlling the game and then that German Bird came out and started making nonsenses. I'm dazzled. We defended him very well. I have no clue how much he scored. 40? 50? We worked with him very well. I'm dazzled. What happened in the third quarter? Dirk started shooting. Dirk is Dirk. Fantastic."

— Šarūnas Jasikevičius, following the 84–80 victory over Germany in EuroBasket 2007.

Lithuania started EuroBasket well, crushing both Turkey (86–69), and the Czech Republic (95–75) before a harder group closer with Germany. Dirk Nowitzki, who scored 28 points, helped the Germans cut a 17-point Lithuanian advantage at halftime to just four by the game's end (84–80). Lithuanians successfully qualified into the second stage.

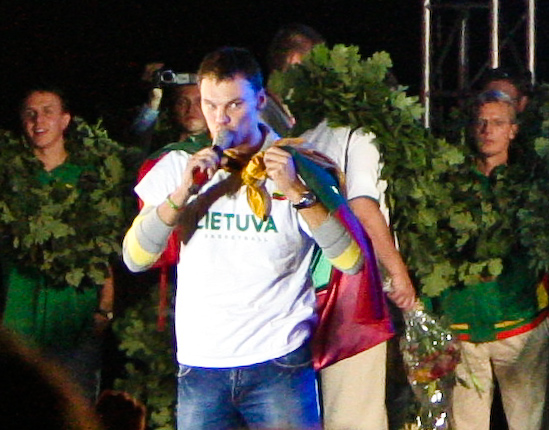
Šarūnas Jasikevičius, addressing the fans before singing Trys Milijonai along with the crowd, during the team's meeting ceremony in Vilnius

Round 2 had Lithuania winning much disputed games against Italy (79–74), and France (88–73), before a sweeping of Slovenia 80–61.

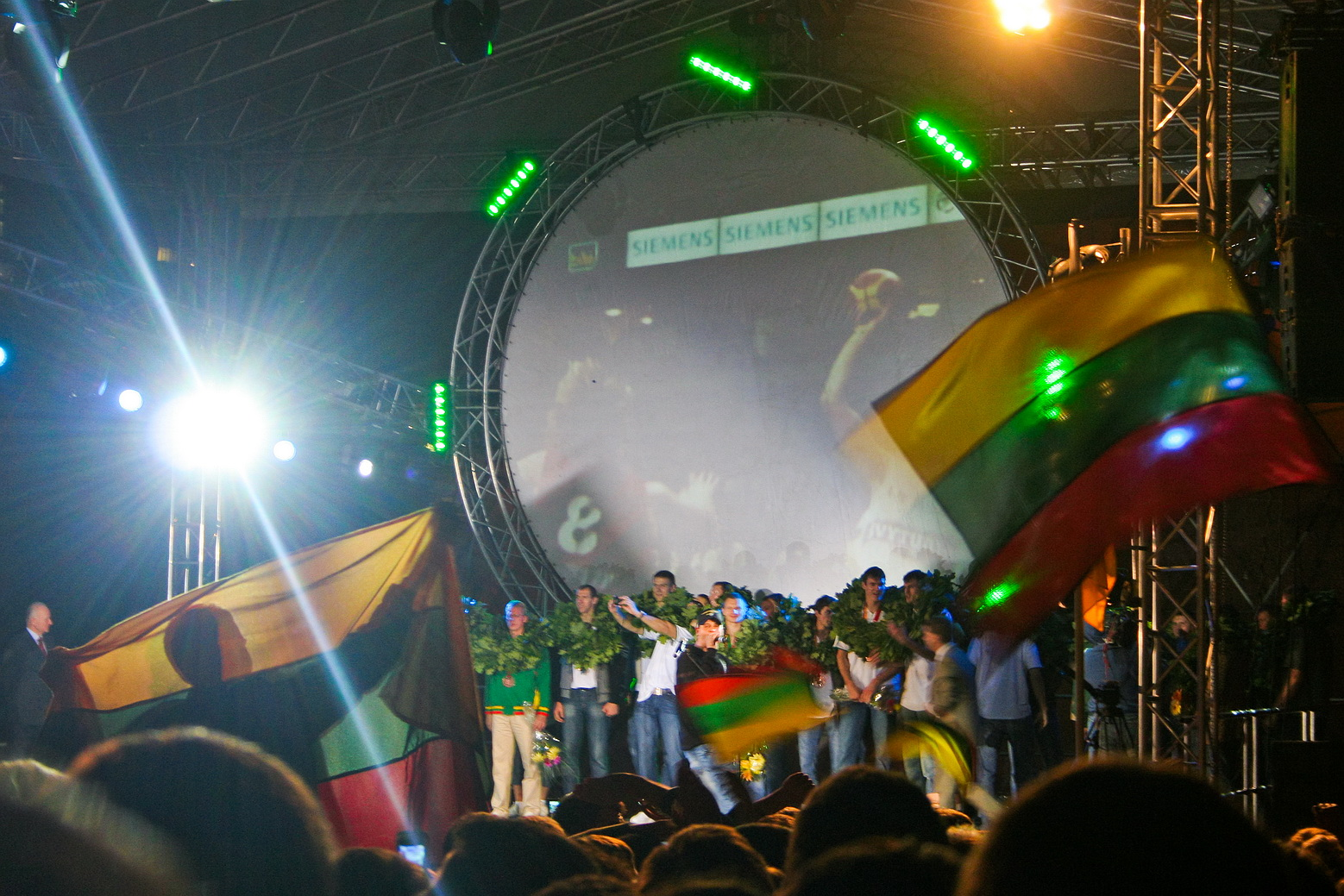
Meeting of bronze medalists in Vilnius, 17 September 2007

The quarterfinals had Lithuania against the traditional Croatia national team, which did not yield to the Lithuanians' superiority and even lead after the first and third quarters. An imposing fourth quarter had Lithuania achieving 74–72, completing seven straight victories en route to the semifinal.

Russia was awaiting at the semifinals. The Lithuanians, who had yet to defeat the Russians, failed to accomplish this again. After the first six minutes, the Russians had an 18–3 lead, which escalated to 33–14. However, the Lithuanians' resilience made them erase the deficit by the third quarter, 52–52. Eventually, fatigue that remained from the tough quarterfinal caught up with Lithuania, especially playing against such a powerful adversary. The Russian won 86–74, despite the efforts of Lithuanian captain Ramūnas Šiškauskas, who scored 30 points. Following the game, Šarūnas Jasikevičius declared that: "We have to forget everything and endeavor to win the medals. [...>] The situation of the Greeks is the same as ours. They also painfully lost, they will wish to achieve the medals as well. We will give everything we got and we will try to win".

The upcoming game had two prizes at stake, the European bronze – which Lithuania had never won, only three golds and two silvers – and the last direct spot for the 2008 Summer Olympics, held in Beijing. Lithuania managed to beat the Greeks 78–69. On 17 September, the players had a meeting ceremony in Vilnius to get state awards.

=== 2008 Beijing Summer Olympics ===
With the fifth straight Olympic tournament following independence ahead, the Lithuania national team started 2008 with a frustration. The Cleveland Cavaliers refused to release Žydrūnas Ilgauskas for the Games, even as the LKF managed to find financing for the NBA franchise's US$22 million insurance tax. During a press conference to announce his absence from the Games, Ilgauskas added that he was in pain from injuries he suffered during the 2007-08 NBA season, making the Cavaliers' medical staff recommend him go through immediate surgery.

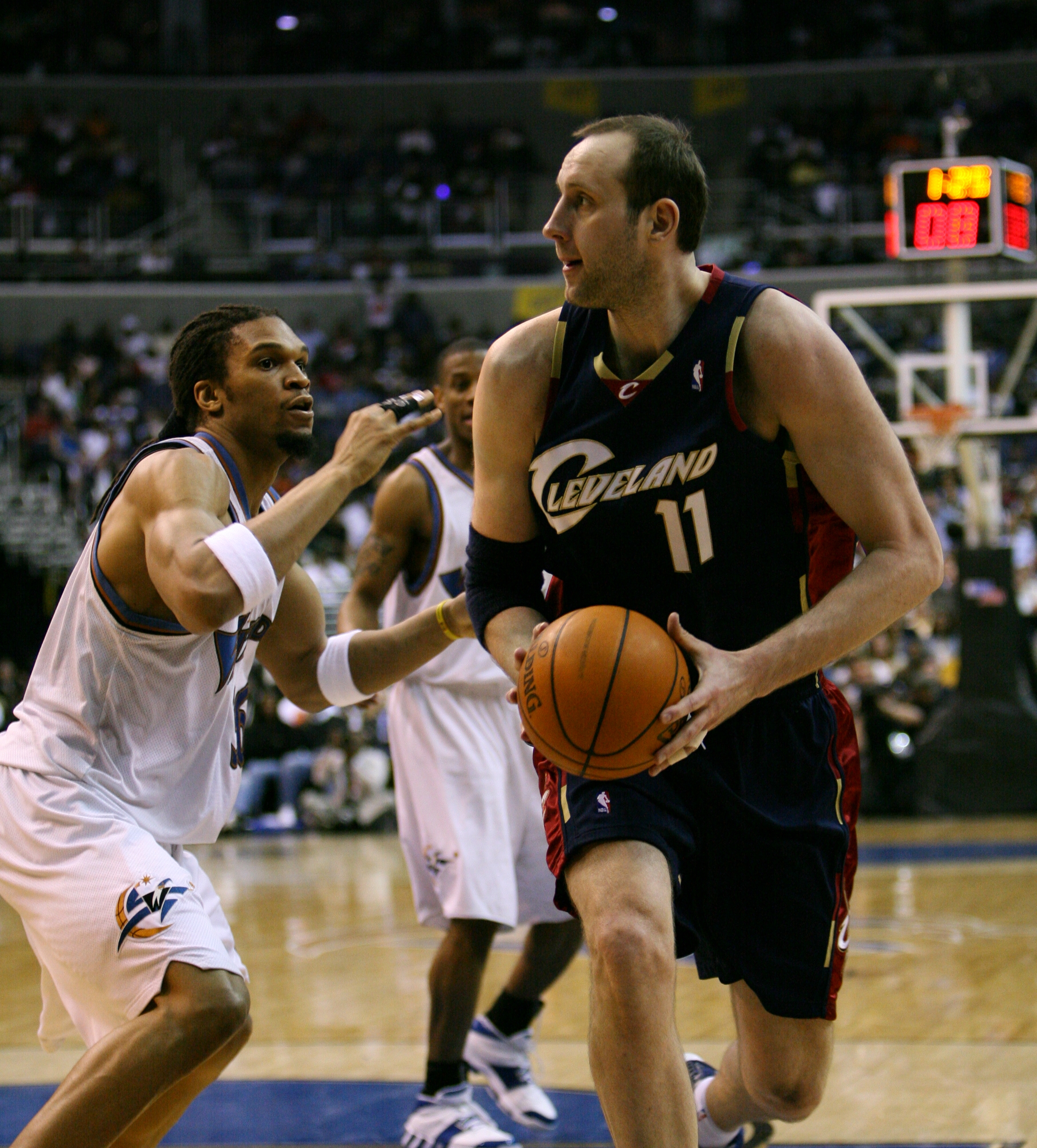
Žydrūnas Ilgauskas was denied a participation in the Olympics by the Cleveland Cavaliers.

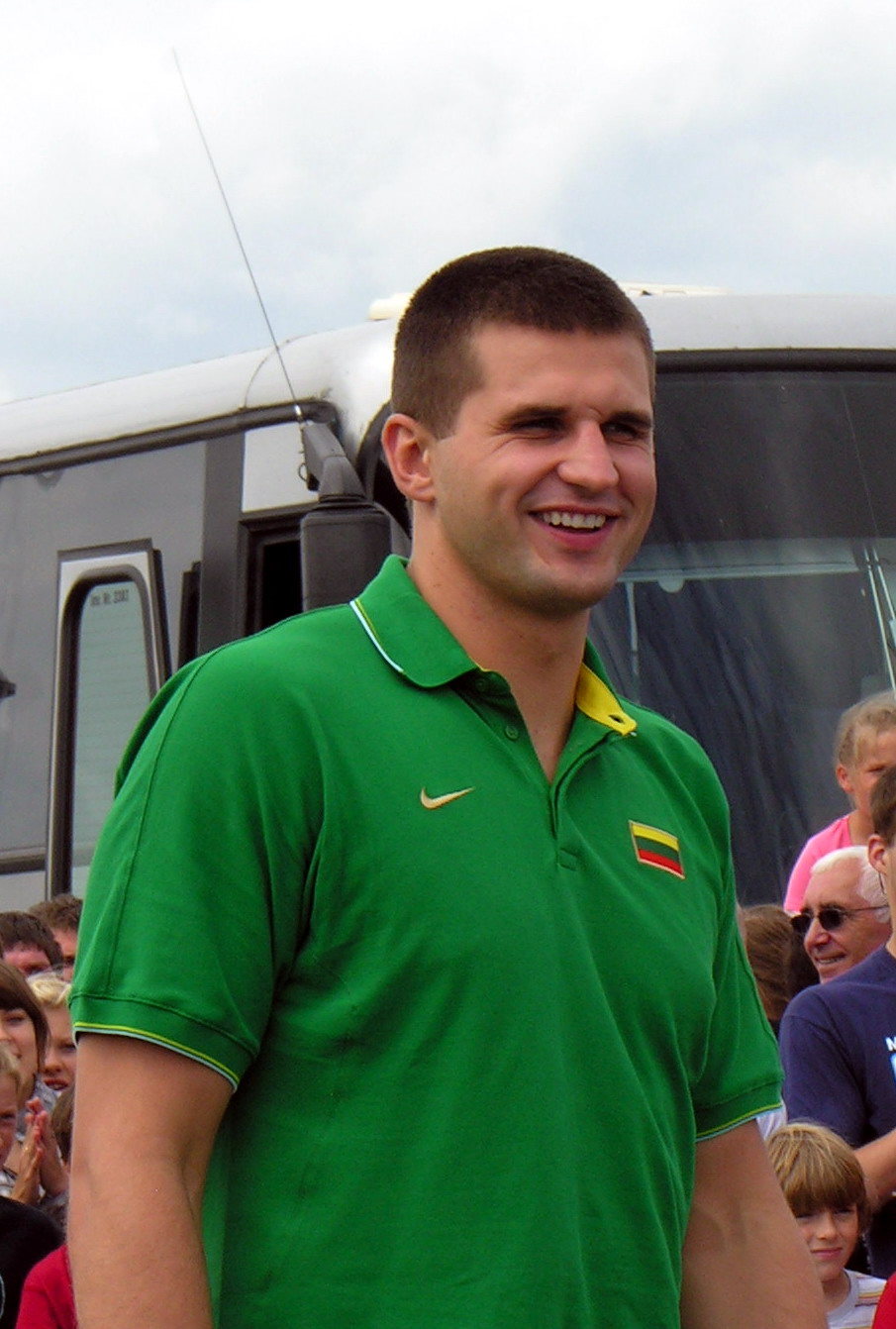
Linas Kleiza, one of the Lithuanian team leaders at the 2008 Olympics

Preparation for the tournament was slightly different this time: Lithuania did not compete in any tournaments, only playing friendlies. The only two defeats in nine games were against Spain and the United States. Again the Olympics opening ceremony had Lithuania's flagbearer being a basketball player, this time Šarūnas Jasikevičius.

The 2008 Olympic tournament started with a tough opponent, defending gold medalists Argentina. Lithuania lead for most of the game, only for the Argentinians to tie with 18 seconds remaining. A decisive play by Linas Kleiza gave the lead and the victory for Lithuanians 79–75. The second game against Asia representatives Iran had Lithuania surprisingly losing the first quarter 15–20, only to dominate afterwards for a handful 99–67. Though, then Lithuanians obviously shown their advantage, crushing them 99–67. Difficult victories over Russia (86–79, Lithuania's first FIBA victory over them) and Croatia (86–73) gave Lithuania a guaranteed first place spot in the group. Thus the team barely cared in the round 1 closer with Australia, suffering 25 turnovers and being smashed 75–106.

The deadly quarterfinal had Lithuania against hosts China, in front of 18,000 spectators. With Chinese star Yao Ming well defended by Lithuania, the Balts crushed them 94–68 to advanced into the semi-finals.

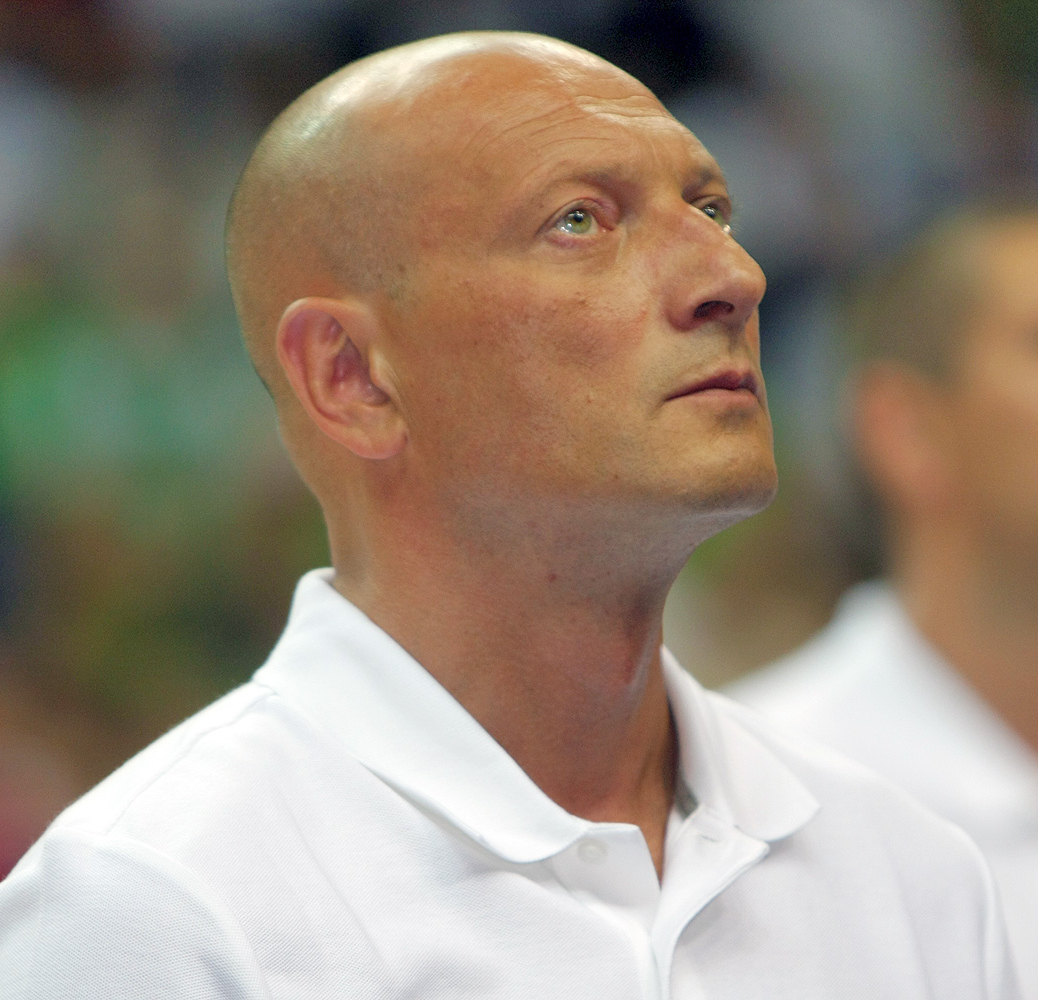
Ramūnas Butautas, coach of the 2008 Olympic Team

Though, again a tough semifinal awaited against defending world champions Spain. The victory value was huge: the dreamed Olympic final, guaranteed silver and a chance at gold, while also providing the opportunity to take back on the 66–91 shellacking during preparations. Both teams played at their best, with Spain compensating the absence of José Calderón to lead by the first quarter, only for Lithuania to dominate for the following two and having a minimal 74–73 advantage by the fourth. Then rising performances by Rudy Fernandez and Pau Gasol (9 and 7 points respectively) during the concluding quarter along with the Lithuanians' exhaustion and lack of big men input lead the Spanish to barely edge and win the semifinal 91–86. Head coach Ramūnas Butautas said that the team played well and there was no need to be disappointed.

Lithuania was for the fifth consecutive time at the Olympic bronze match, hoping to get their fourth medals against former Olympic champions Argentina. Though, the tough semifinal had the Lithuanians tired and emotionally distraught, which the experienced adversary took advantage despite not counting with injured star Manu Ginóbili. By the third quarter, the game seemed already lost as Lithuanians trailed 67–49. The reduction of the deficit in the fourth was not enough to prevent Lithuania from losing another third place game, 75–87. Still, five Olympic semifinals proved the Lithuanians were still one of the strongest basketball teams worldwide despite hailing from a small country.

=== EuroBasket 2009 ===
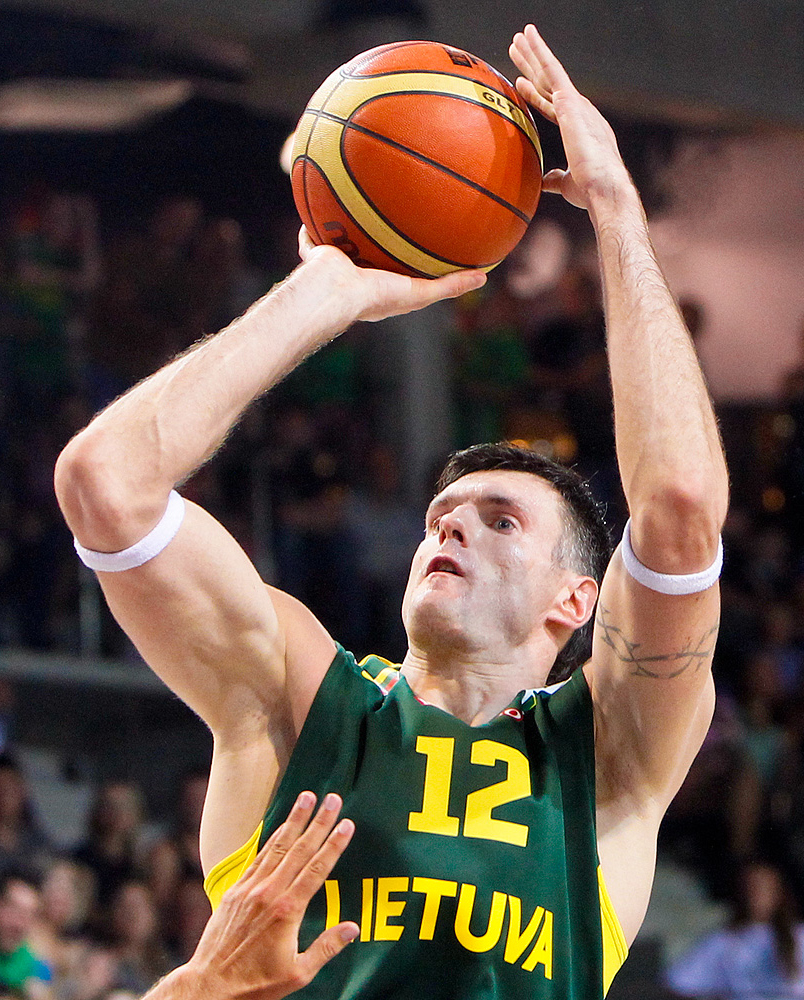
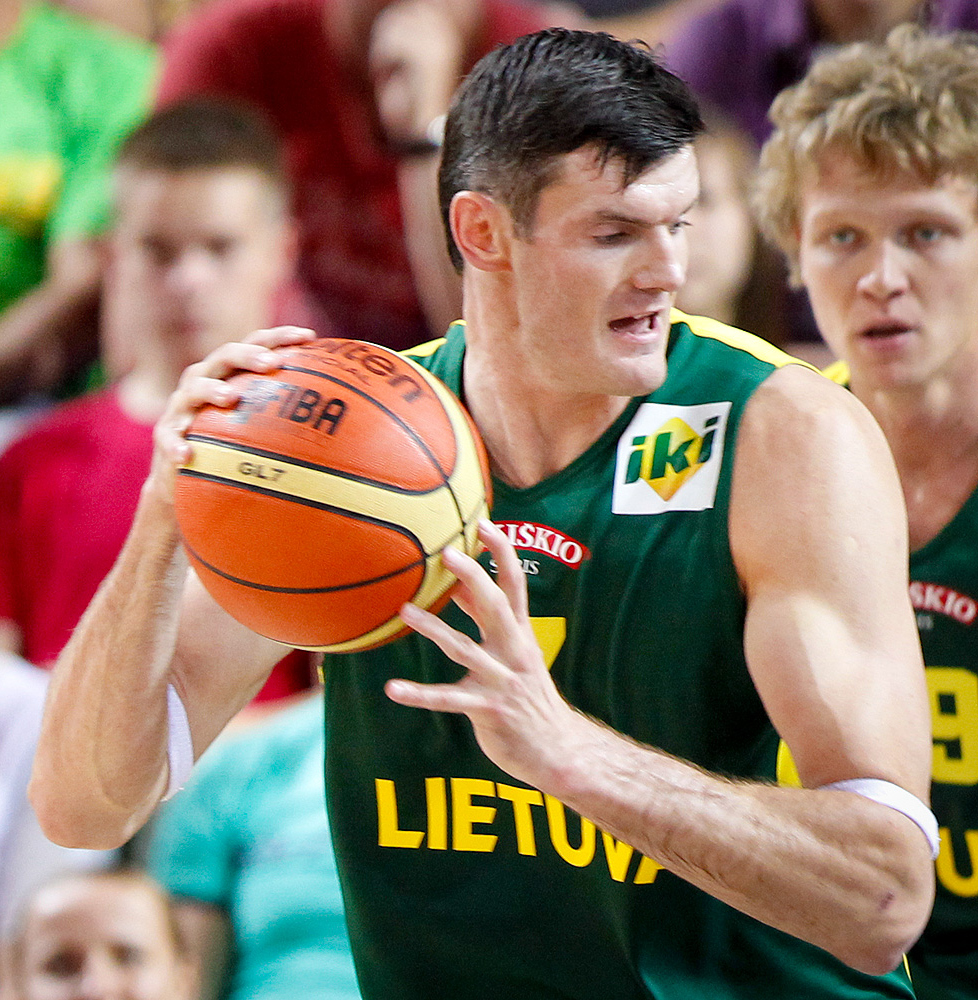
The Lavrinovič twins (Kšyštof, left, and Darjuš, right) could not prevent Lithuania from having its worst continental result at EuroBasket 2009.

Before EuroBasket 2009 in Poland, Lithuanian stars like Šarūnas Jasikevičius, Ramūnas Šiškauskas, Darius Songaila, Arvydas Macijauskas, Rimantas Kaukėnas and Žydrūnas Ilgauskas decided not to join the national team. In preparation, the national team took part in another Acropolis Tournament, finishing third by beating Russia and losing to Greece and Turkey.

After huge losses in the team roster and point guard shortage, Lithuania started the tournament with a loss to Turkey (76–84). This was the first time in the 21st century that the Lithuanians began a championship with a defeat. Later Lithuanians disappointingly lost to Poland, and depended on a strong fourth quarter to beat Bulgaria. Finishing third in its group, Lithuania qualified for the second round. However, it already begun badly with a 23-point loss to Slovenia. Following this shocking loss, team's captain Robertas Javtokas, when asked about the team's future, said: "I don't know what else we could promise. We must get straight or it is enough of promises. We must come as men with balls and not like kids. Otherwise, other teams will humiliate us again". The team's game still not improved, with a defeat to Spain (70–84) diminishing the Lithuanians' chances to qualify for the quarterfinals, and a loss to Serbia eliminating the team outright, with the final standing being a measly 12th place. Coach Ramūnas Butautas took all responsibility for the fiasco and resigned. It is regarded as the worst Lithuania national team performance ever.

=== FIBA World Championship 2010 ===
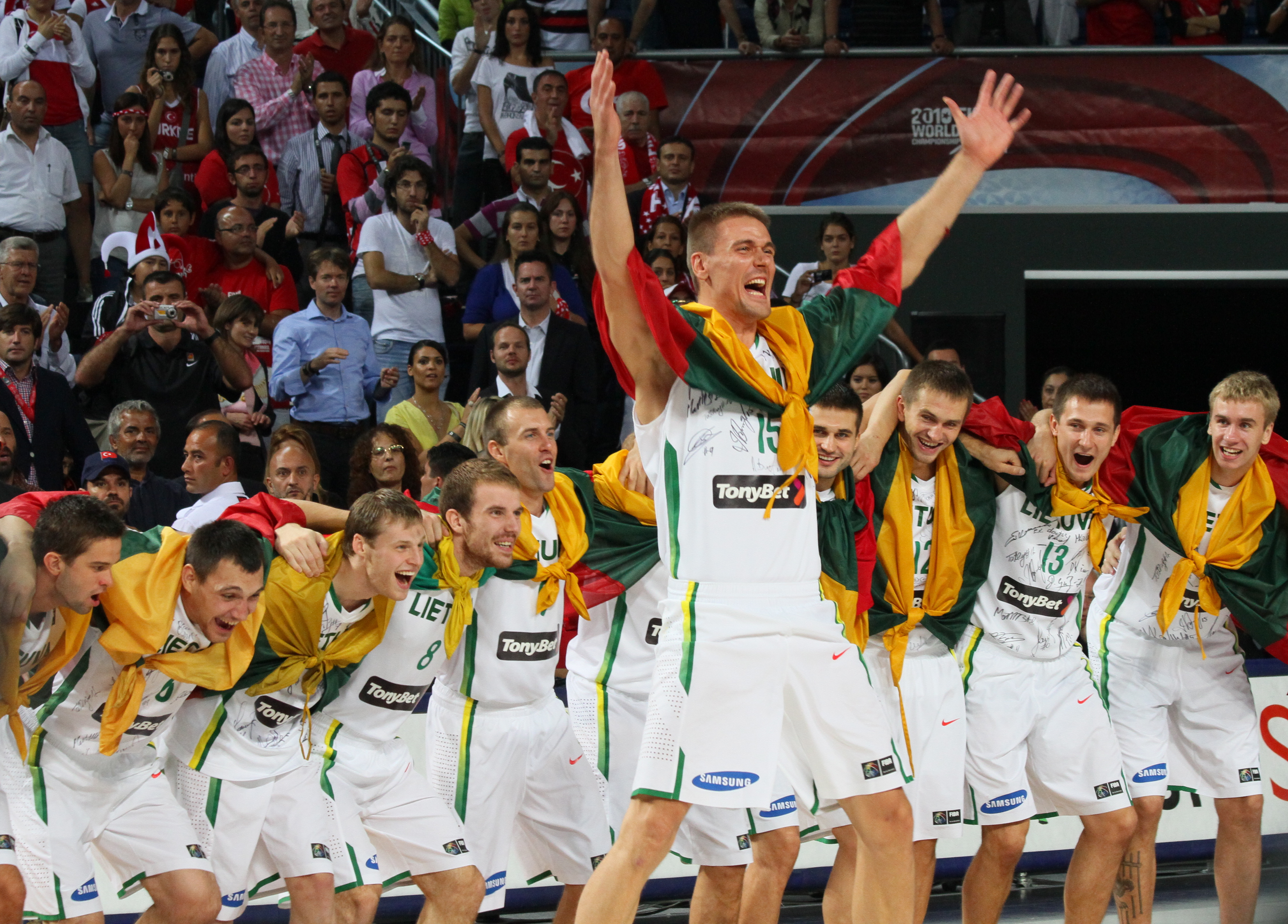
Lithuanian squad at the FIBA World Championship 2010

On 12 December 2009, Lithuania was granted a wild card to participate in the World Championship in Turkey the following year.

Lithuania started the tournament against New Zealand. After a tough first quarter, Lithuanians took control of the game and kept ahead by a comfortable lead, finishing 92–79. The second game was against Canada. After reducing a 17-point deficit in the fourth quarter, Lithuanians finally gained a small lead towards the end of the game. Canada had a chance to win the game, but Jermaine Anderson's game winning three rimmed out at the last second and Lithuania celebrated their second victory 70–68. The next match was against the defending champion Spain, and after another comeback from an 18-point deficit, the Lithuanians won the upsetting game 76–73, Linas Kleiza's free-throws sealing the victory.

Already guaranteed in the knockout rounds, Lithuania faced the group's other undefeated team, France. The French quickly gained momentum in the first half and forced Lithuania to a double-digit deficit. However, in the second half, Lithuania deftly reduced the deficit and cruised past the French defense, outscoring them 45–25 to win the game 69–55 and take the group's leadership. The preliminary round ended with a perfect record as Lebanon was handily defeated 84–66.

After sweeping China (78–67) in the eighth finals and crushing Argentina (104–85) in the quarterfinals, Lithuania lost to Team USA by 15 points. They captured the bronze medal after winning against Eurobasket's silver medalist Serbia 99–88. This was Lithuania's best World Championship result.

=== EuroBasket 2011 ===
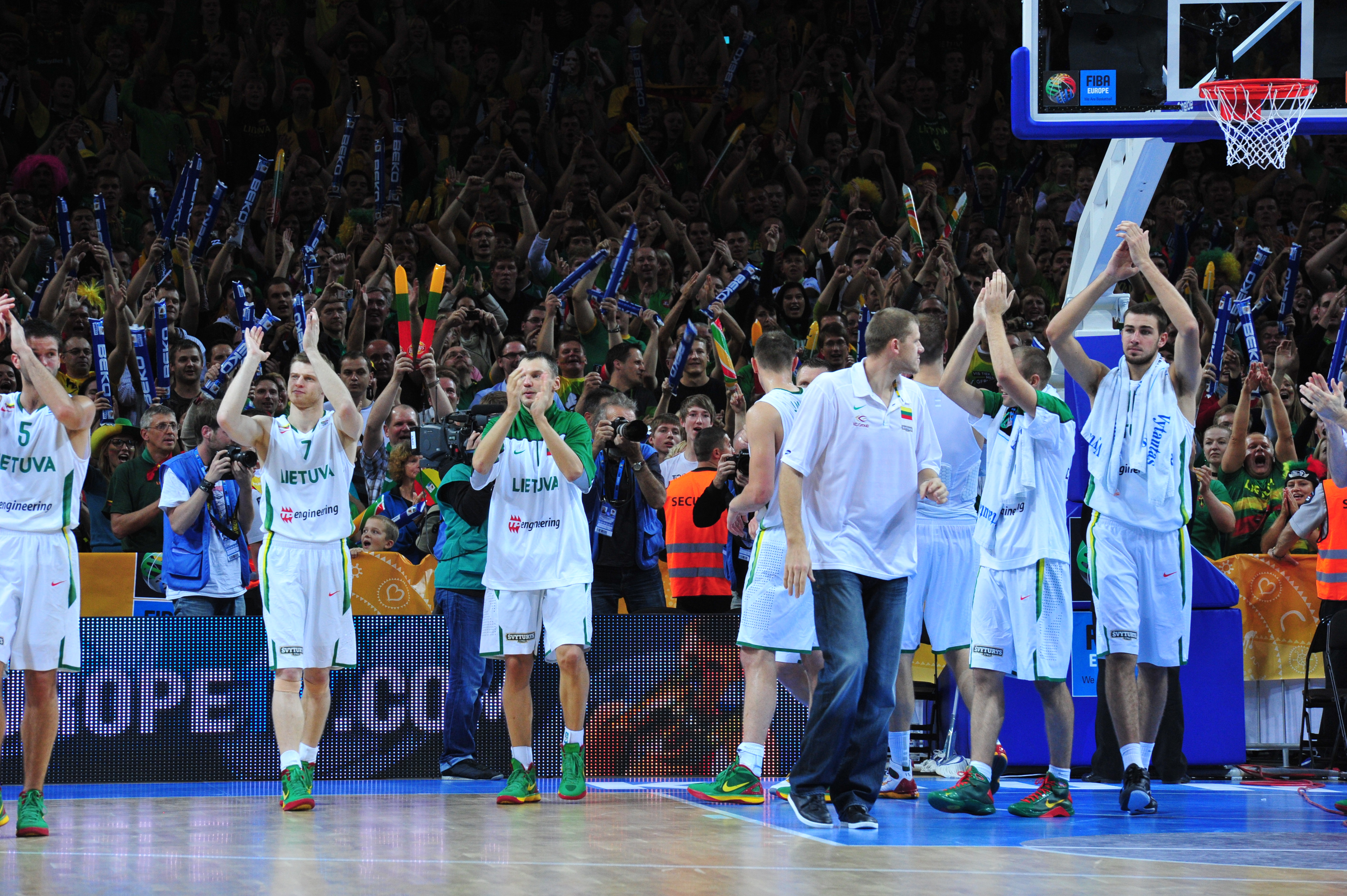
Lithuania national team members greeting fans after a 2011 game

After 72 years, Lithuania was again hosting the EuroBasket in 2011. The national team was under much pressure given both the expectations as hosts and the outstanding performance at the World Championship the year before. The team tried to combine future prospects and the past stars, but during the leading months, lost two of its starting players, Linas Kleiza and Jonas Mačiulis, due to knee injuries. During EuroBasket, Marijonas Petravičius was diagnosed with pulmonary embolism after three games played. Not only Petravičius had to miss the rest of the tournament, but the disease marked the end of his professional career.

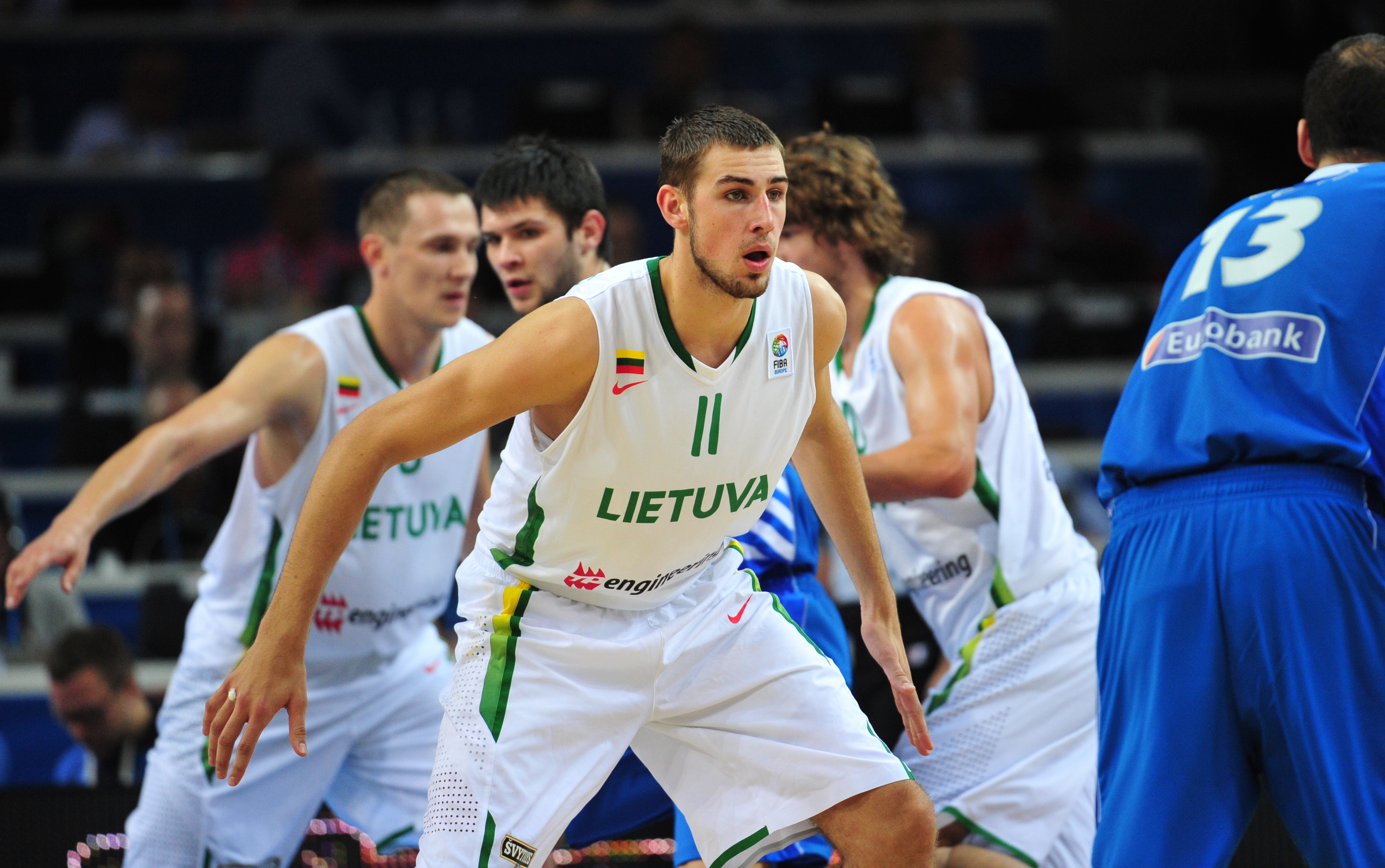
Lithuania versus Greece in 2011

Numerous officials and other European basketball specialists and pundits found EuroBasket 2011 the best European tournament ever, particularly due to the Lithuanian enthusiasm for the sport. However, the Lithuanian team wound up underperforming, suffering an upset in the quarterfinals to Macedonia. The consolation playoffs led to a final standing of fifth place, giving Lithuania a spot at the 2012 FIBA World Olympic Qualifying Tournament for Men.

=== 2012 FIBA World Olympic qualifying tournament ===
Twenty years later, Lithuania had to go through a dedicated Olympic qualifier, held in July 2012 in Caracas, Venezuela. The top three teams would get spots at the 2012 Olympics basketball tournament.

The team started off the tournament with a convincing victory against Venezuela, followed by an upset to Nigeria the following day. With all three teams tied with one win and one loss, Venezuela wound up disqualified due to a lesser point difference. Afterwards, many incidents regarding the Lithuanian squad were rumored to be caused by disgruntled Venezuelans. These included a tank column near the training hall polluting the air during the Lithuanian team workout, a broken bus during the trip to the arena before the quarterfinal game against Puerto Rico, and vanished jerseys and water during said match. Despite all that, Lithuania managed to defeat Puerto Rico in a dramatic game. In the semifinals, Lithuania crushed the Dominican Republic and thus qualified for the 2012 London Olympics.

=== 2012 London Summer Olympics ===
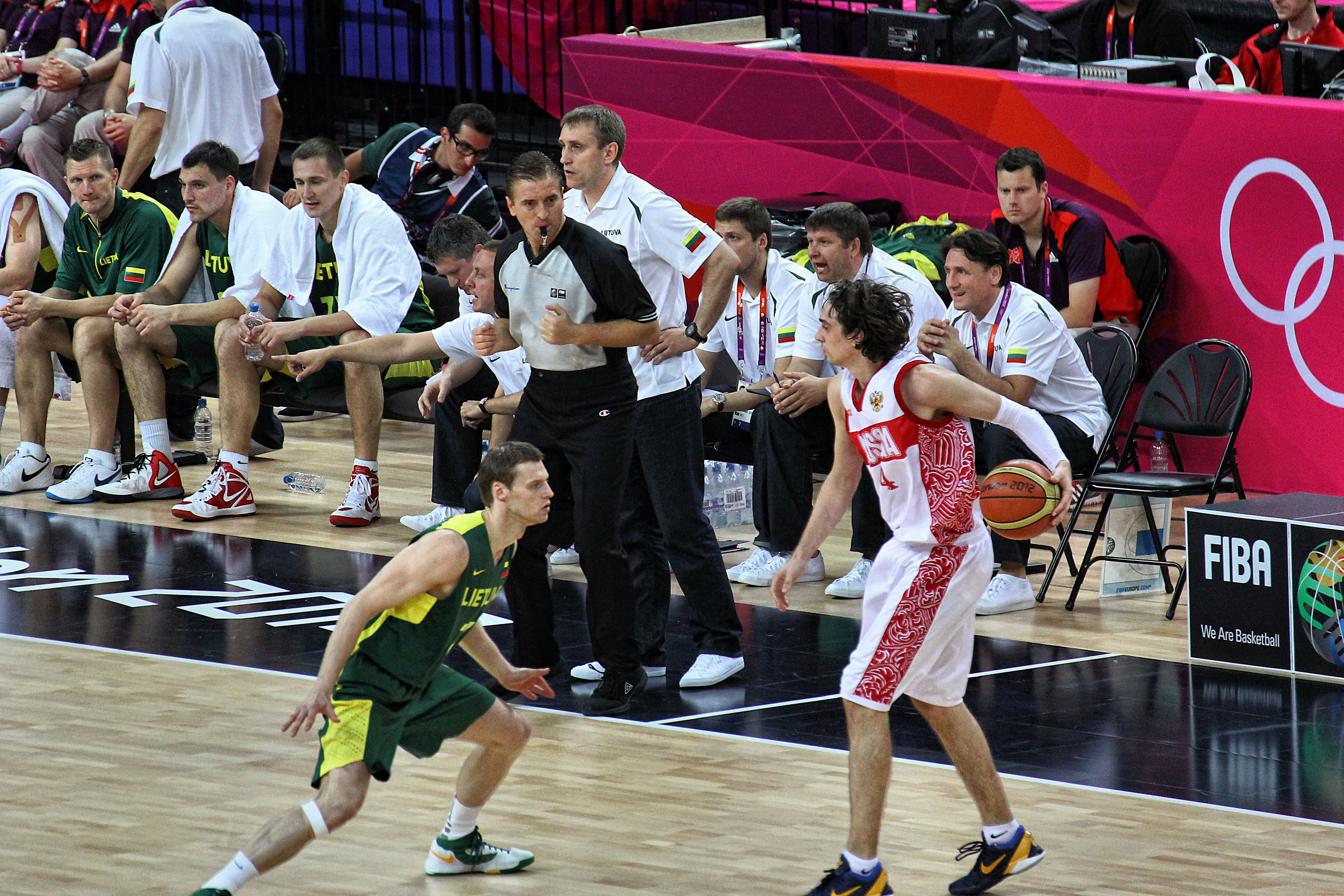
Olympic quarterfinal: Lithuania vs. Russia

After dominating in the Qualifying Tournament, Lithuania had a tough time at the Olympics. The first game against Argentina turned into a fiasco, as the South Americans forced Lithuania into a double-digit deficit in the first half, and kept a comfortable lead in the second half to finish the game strong, 102–79. Luis Scola, who was held down to 13 points in the quarterfinal match against Lithuania two years ago at the World Championship, led Argentina with 32 points. Lithuania rebounded from the loss playing with Nigeria, which also served to avenge the only defeat in the Qualifying Tournament. Playing exemplary defense against the Nigerian bigs Al-Farouq Aminu and Ike Diogu, Lithuania handily won 72–53. Next was another defeat, as France rode Tony Parker and Boris Diaw to win the game 74–82. The following game was against USA, which had just broke recordswith their 156–73 win over Nigeria. Right from the beginning, Lithuania proved to be a tough opponent for Team USA, with Linas Kleiza scoring 25 points, and former Duke player Martynas Pocius having 7 rebounds and 6 assists. The Lithuania were down by only 4 points at the half and 6 at the end of the third quarter. In the final quarter, Lithuania momentarily took the lead 84–82, but lost it again as LeBron James scored 9 points in 4 minutes to achieve a 94–99 win. ESPN's Marc Stein reacted to the near-defeat remembering the other struggle the "Dream Team" had with Lithuania in 2000, and adding that even if it was "the weakest Lithuanian team they've ever faced in Olympic basketball competition, a limited Lithuania is still Lithuania. Still stubborn. Still dangerous. Still causing a variety of problems for USA Basketball."

Despite its third loss in the tournament, Lithuania still had a chance to qualify to the knockout rounds by defeating Tunisia, which they did 63–76. Thus, Lithuania had the final spot in the quarterfinals, facing the other group's leader, Russia. While the Russians never left the lead, Lithuania always kept it close, and by the fourth quarter was just one point behind. Still their attempts for an upset fell short, and ended up losing 74–83, making it the first time Lithuania missed the Olympic semifinal. Veterans Rimantas Kaukėnas, Darius Songaila and Šarūnas Jasikevičius scored half of the team's points in that game. Later in an interview, Jasikevičius said that he expected the younger players from the World Championship to carry the team, but the opposite happened. Songaila and Kaukėnas agreed, and all three retired from the national team after the tournament. On 1 October, the Lithuanian Basketball Federation brought Jonas Kazlauskas back after 12 years to replace Kęstutis Kemzūra.

=== EuroBasket 2013 ===
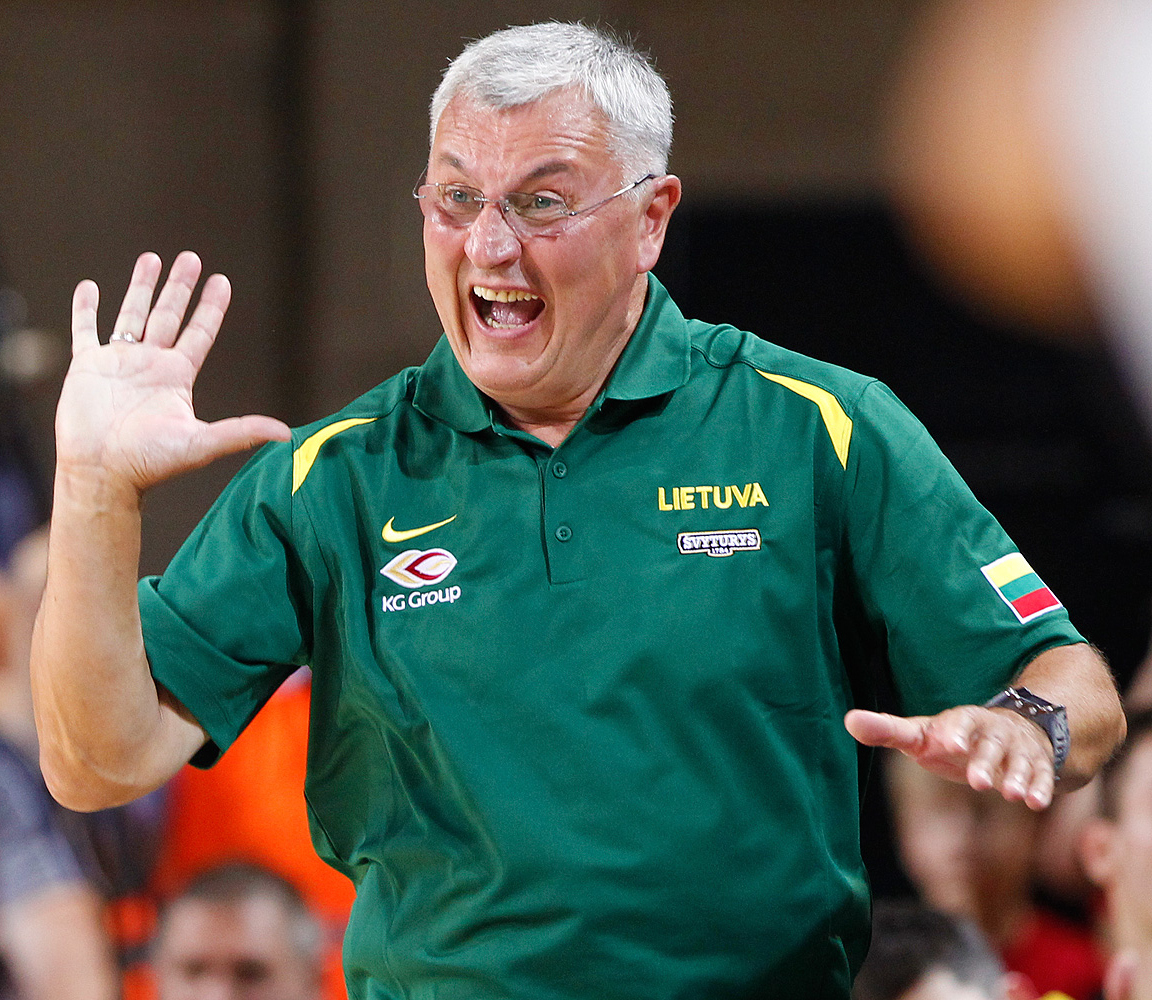
Jonas Kazlauskas returned as Lithuania manager in 2013, and successfully coached it for an Olympic period.

Even before EuroBasket 2013 in Slovenia started, the Lithuanian team had problems: their flight on 2 September was cancelled due to airplane problems, forcing them to delay their flight until the next day, and miss their first morning workout in Podmežakla Hall. Just one day later, Lithuania played their first game against Serbia. Unable to defend Serbian star Nenad Krstić, who dominated the game with 20 points and 9 rebounds, Lithuania lost 63–56. The second game against Macedonia had many expectations, as Lithuania wanted to avenge getting upset at home in the previous tournament. Through effective defense of Bo McCalebb, the Lithuanians could get their first victory with 75–67. Two tough games followed, against fellow Balts Latvia (67–59), and Montenegro in overtime (77:70), due to Kšyštof Lavrinovič, who only scored 2 points during his first three matches, rising up to score 24 points. The group stage ended against Bosnia and Herzegovina, whose star Mirza Teletović scored 31 points and fantastic three-pointers to beat the Lithuanians 72–78, who still managed to qualify to the second round with crucial three-pointers by Linas Kleiza.

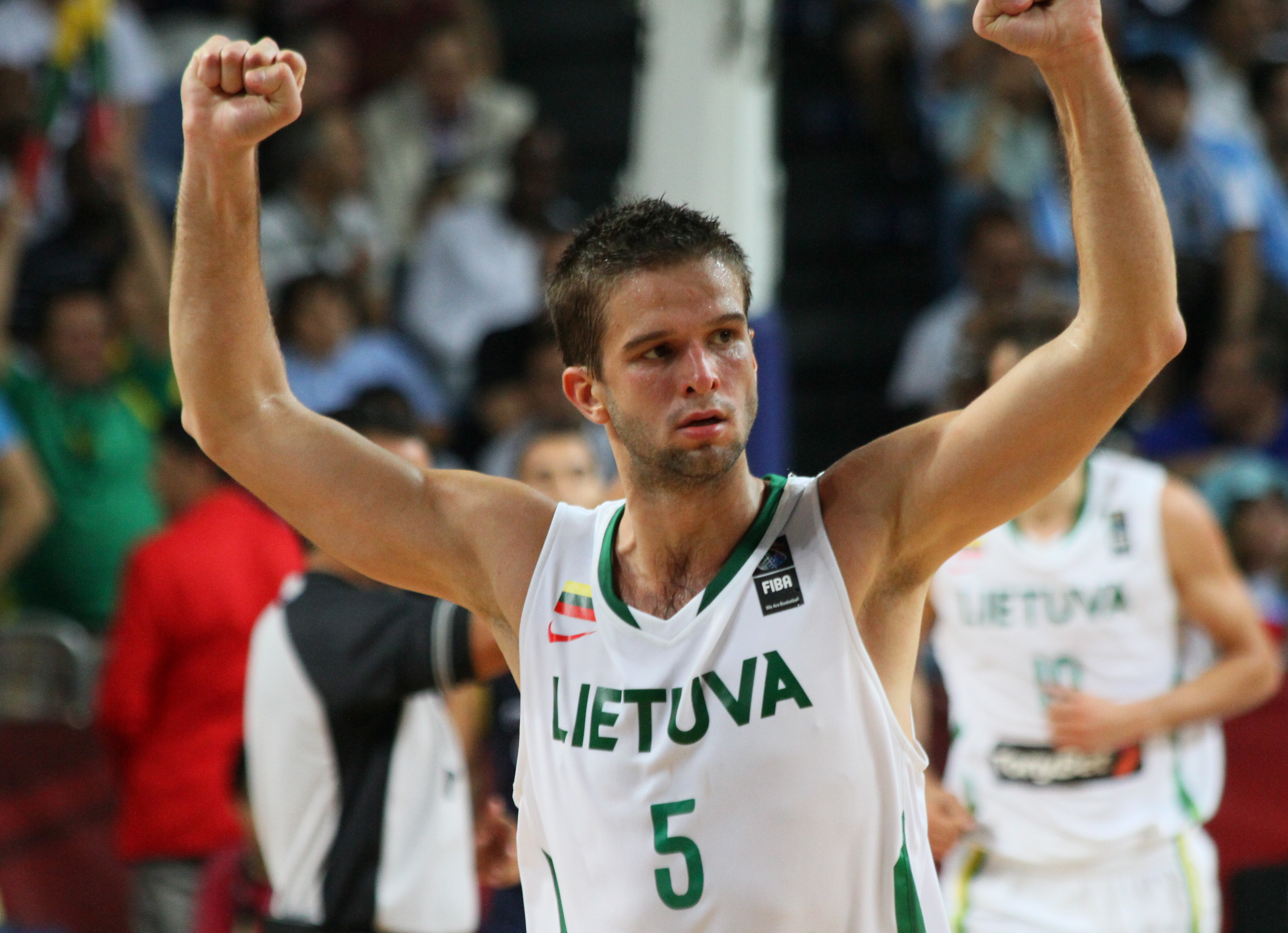
Mantas Kalnietis led the Lithuania squad to a silver medal.

Second round started against defending vice-champions France, which forced Lithuania into solid defense – especially against Tony Parker – to win the game 76–62. Then Lithuanians easily crushed Belgium 86–67, and narrowly defeated Ukraine with 70–63. The knockout round wound begin against Italy, which Lithuania beat by 81–77. The semifinals with Croatia had Jonas Mačiulis, Linas Kleiza and Mantas Kalnietis dominating with 63 points combined out of the team's 77, guaranteeing Lithuania their fifth European final. The final was a rematch with France. Lithuanians only fought point-to-point in the first quarter. By the third, France finished the quarter with a 14–0 run that kept Lithuania scoreless for four minutes. Eventually the Lithuanians suffered a 66–80 defeat. Despite the deep run, some players said that it was hard to celebrate after losing the final. Still, on 23 September 2013, thousands of Lithuanians came to the Rotušės (Town Hall) square to celebrate the Lithuania national team success, and the following day the squad was greeted at the Presidential Palace.

=== 2014 FIBA World Cup ===
After becoming European vice-champions in 2013, Lithuanians automatically qualified into the 2014 FIBA World Cup in Spain. On 13 May, head coach Jonas Kazlauskas announced both the extended main roster for the national team and the reserve roster. On 1 July, he announced the condensed candidate roster. Captain Robertas Javtokas and team leader Linas Kleiza decided not to participate in the 2014 World Cup due to injuries. On 7 July, first Lithuania national team training camp was organized in Palanga. On 18 August, Lithuania won a preparation game against Slovenia with result 80–76, achieving the national team's 500th victory and the 100th under coach Jonas Kazlauskas. The next nine preparation games were all wins, raising expectations for the Lithuanian performance.

On 26 August, just a few hours before the last preparation game against Croatia, a final team roster was announced without Artūras Gudaitis and Adas Juškevičius. However, everything turned upside down rapidly in the game itself, when in only three minutes captain and Mantas Kalnietis dislocated his clavicle, forcing him to miss the World Cup. Juškevičius was chosen as his replacement, and Šarūnas Vasiliauskas also won a roster spot. Paulius Jankūnas became the new team captain.

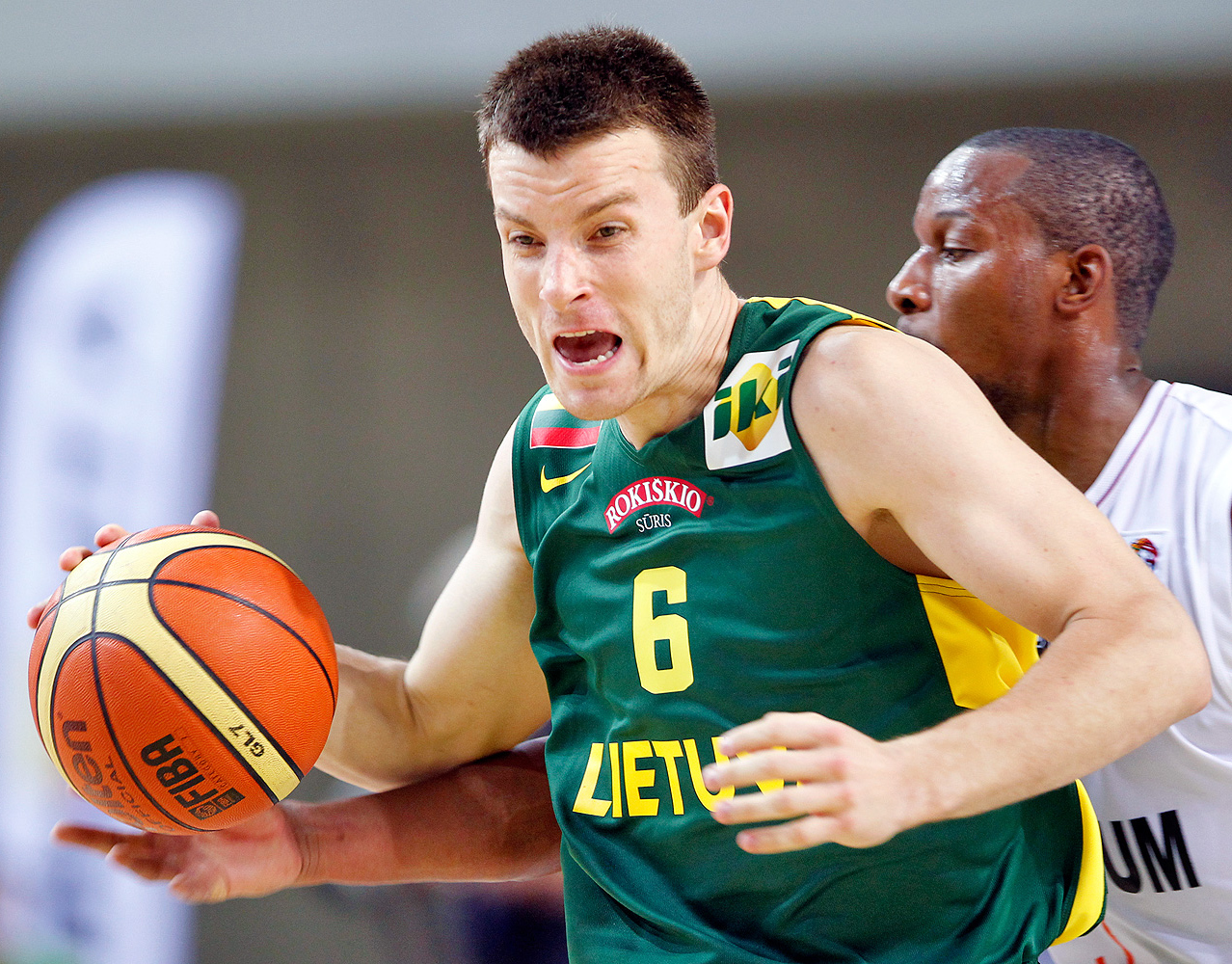
Adas Juškevičius was a last minute addition to the World Cup roster.

The tournament begun with a tough victory over FIBA Americas champions Mexico, 87–74. While the Mexicans won the first quarter 27–22, the Lithuanians then achieved their domination, marked by scoring 20 points against only 2 in the third quarter. One day later, another difficult match was held against African champions Angola, that the Lithuanians won 75–62, led by the young Donatas Motiejūnas and Jonas Valančiūnas, who scored a combined 23 points and defended the team with 18 rebounds. Tough games continued for Lithuania. The third game against Australia had the Lithuanians 19 points behind at halftime, winning the third quarter 28–15, and leading at some points of the concluding period, but still lost 75–82. Head coach Jonas Kazlauskas described the game as having the team's worst first half that season. The team recovered by sweeping South Korea 79–49, guaranteeing a spot at the knockout rounds and managing to become the first team in FIBA World Cup history to not have any free throw attempts. Lithuania took first spot in the group by closing with a tremendous victory against Slovenia, 67–64, with the Slovenians only scoring two points in the fourth quarter.

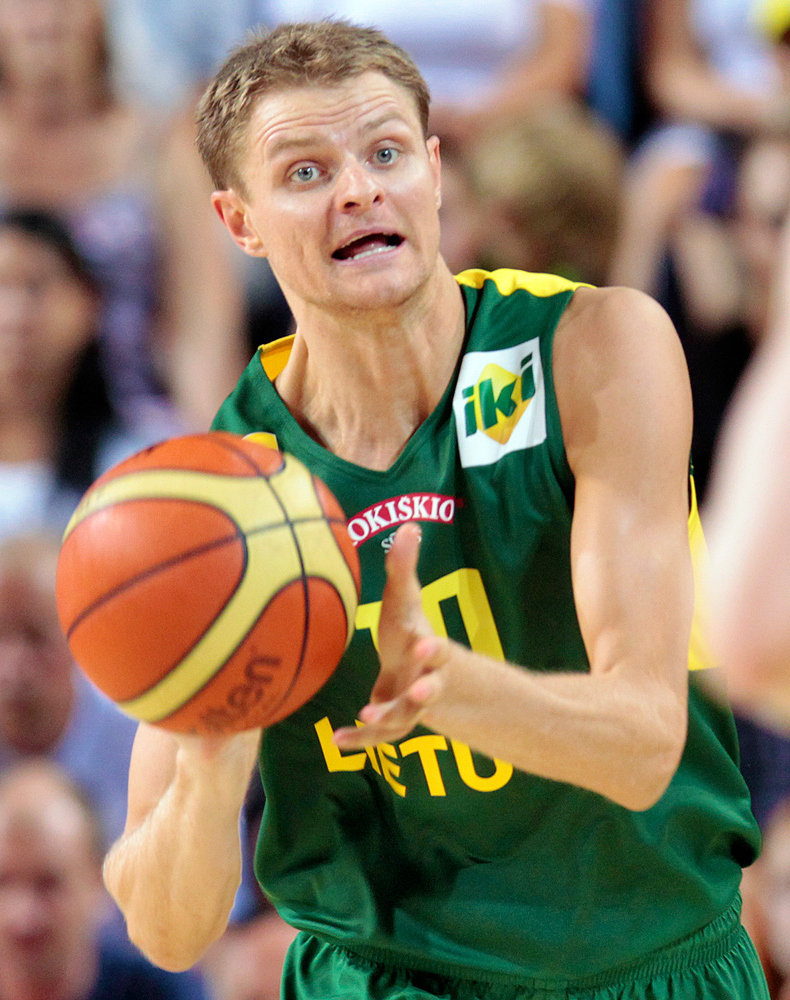
Renaldas Seibutis often played as point guard during the crucial game moments.

During the eighthfinals, Jonas Valančiūnas led Lithuania to a difficult victory against New Zealand, 76–71. In the quarterfinals, Renaldas Seibutis helped Lithuania beat Turkey 73–61 and advanced into the semifinals, once again meeting the United States. Before the game, USA national team head coach Mike Krzyzewski noted that the Lithuanians "love the game, they play with the passion, they play together, always as a team. They play with the great heart and it will be a tough game for us."

Lithuania fought point-for-point through two quarters; however, after half-time Team USA scored 10–0 and after winning the third quarter 33–14, leaving no chances for the Lithuanian team to come back. They ultimately lost the game 68–96. It was one of the worst performances for Lithuania against Team USA, following the 51-point defeat in the 1992 Olympics versus the "Dream Team". After the match, coach Jonas Kazlauskas criticized the refereeing: "It just shows what respect every team has. When I asked the referee about the (technical) foul call, he said that he warned the bench not to jump, when Team USA bench was jumping and discussing with the referees just in the same way. Overall, the judging was hardly understandable until Team USA had 20 points lead. Later there was no point in discussing with the referees anymore". Longtime Lithuanian national team games broadcast commentator Robertas Petrauskas ironically described the judging live by saying: "When we discuss the judging against Team USA with the journalists from other countries, we all agree that if the referees would call the turnover every time USA player steps before bumping the ball, Team USA would be the most frequent fallible team in the tournament". During the bronze medal game Lithuania faced France, just 2 years removed from the EuroBasket defeat. A terrific battle where youngsters Jonas Valančiūnas and Adas Juškevičius tried to give a win with 39 points combined ensued, but the French still beat them 95–93. Despite not winning any medals, the team was received by thousands of Lithuanians at Rotušės square who wanted to thank the national team for their efforts. According to research, over 2,223 million people observed the national team games live in Lithuania, which is over 76% of the country's population.

=== EuroBasket 2015 ===
"The goal for us this year would be to fight for the title. <...> We were frustrated to lose in the Final two years ago, and we would like to win a gold medal as soon as possible. <...> Like every other Lithuanian player, I dream of winning a title with my country."

— Donatas Motiejūnas, sharing his EuroBasket dreams in February, before his back injury in April.

Following the World Cup's fourth place, Lithuania automatically qualified into the EuroBasket 2015. On 5 May, head coach Jonas Kazlauskas published an extended 25–player main roster, that did not include two long-time players, Simas Jasaitis and Kšyštof Lavrinovič. On 9 July, the shortened roster was announced, with the 12 players enrolled into training camp in Palanga beginning 11 days later. Four mainstays of the team were unable to make the list: power forward Donatas Motiejūnas and centers Darjuš Lavrinovič and Martynas Pocius due to injuries, and Linas Kleiza for exhaustion, expressing a need to rest.

Lithuania began the preparation games phase by defeating Australia twice, as well as Finland and Austria once. Later the team hosted the Huawei Cup at Žalgiris Arena, being champions despite a defeat to Croatia due to wins over Turkey and Macedonia. Lithuanians also appeared again at the Acropolis Tournament, finishing third after crushing the Netherlands, while losing to host Greece and the previously defeated Turkish squad. In total, the national team achieved 7 victories of 10 during the friendly preparation matches. On 1 September, the national team's final EuroBasket 2015 roster was announced.

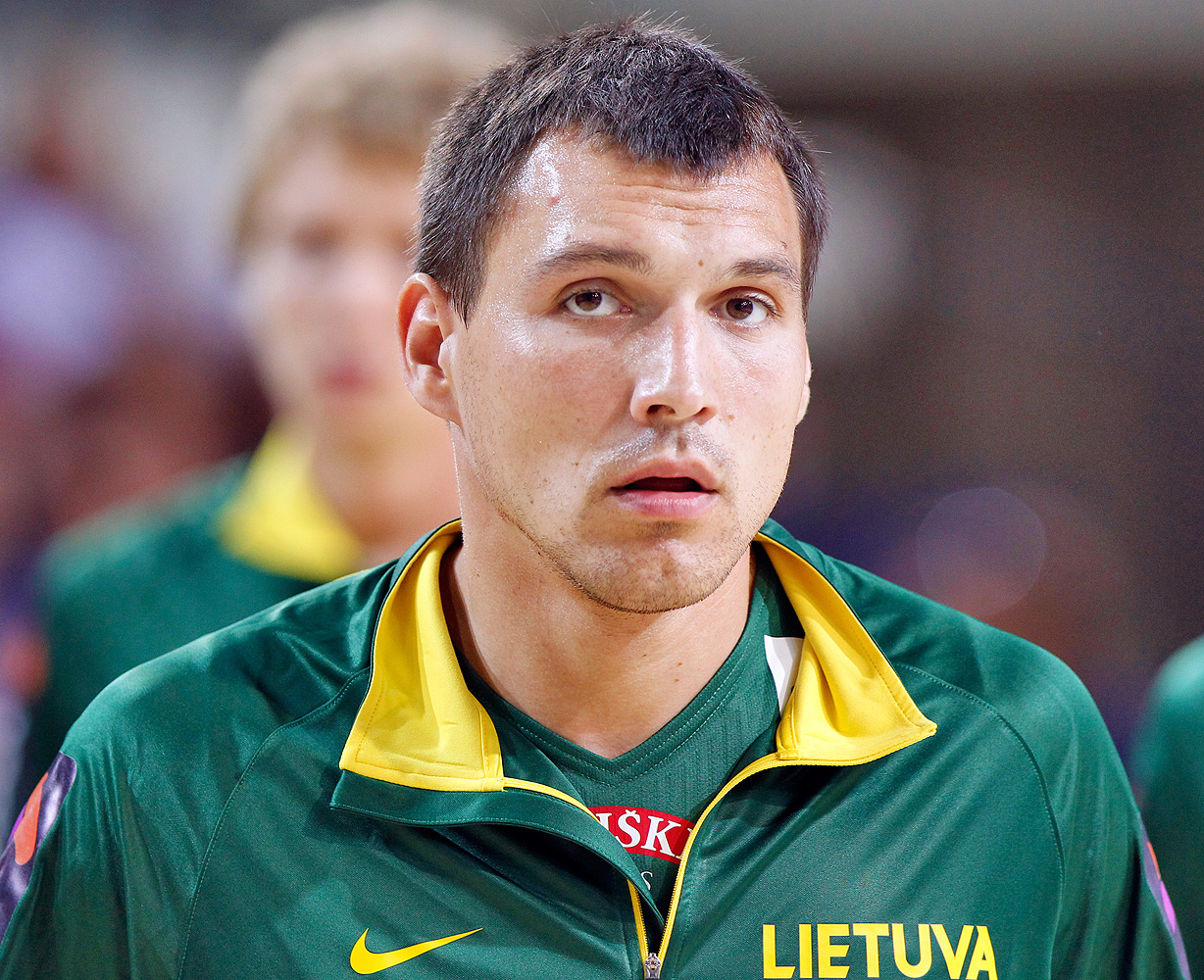
Solid performances by Jonas Mačiulis helped Lithuania get a second straight EuroBasket silver.

Lithuania began the European championship in Riga, on 5 September, versus Ukraine. In an Arena Riga almost completely filled with their yellow-green-red decorated fans, the Lithuanians began the match easily and after the first quarter already had a solid lead (19–12), though then began a decay once Jerome Randle and Kyrylo Fesenko led to a Ukrainian resurgence. Ukraine tied the second quarter (14–14) and won the third (19–17), and almost upset the Lithuanians in the final shot if not for a Robertas Javtokas block that ensured a close Lithuanian win, 69–68. Afterwards, the match against the host Latvians had Lithuania losing the first quarter and leading by just one point by halftime. However, then Jonas Mačiulis led a shutdown of the Latvian three-pointers (only 20% during the whole game), and after two solid remaining quarters (11–20, 10–19) the Lithuanians achieved a 68–49 win. The next day, Lithuania surprisingly lost to the Belgium national team 74–76, despite Mantas Kalnietis achieving a EuroBasket record of assists with 13, and Jonas Valančiūnas also delivering a solid performance (25 points, 12 rebounds). The game was closed on a controversial play, as Belgian Matt Lojeski tipped the ball in with just bits of a second remaining and the referees had to analyze if the scoring was still made on time. After the game, many Lithuanian players argued that time was already expired, even if they were unable to make an appeal because, according to the FIBA rules, it should be made 15 minutes after the game. LKF still wrote a letter to FIBA questioning how they should act in such situations. An illness sidelined Valančiūnas from the fourth game versus Estonia, who were returning to EuroBasket for the first time since 2001. Another close match ensued, with the score tied during the final seconds (62–62) before an accurate shot by Jonas Mačiulis saved the Lithuanians (64–62). Tensions reached new heights in the first round closer against the Czech Republic. The game finished tied in 69–69, forcing an overtime which the Lithuanians won (16–12), guaranteeing first place in the group, in spite of all the previous struggles. Kazlauskas wanted to spare the returning Valančiūnas from much playtime given the recent illness, but the player insisted in playing as much as he could, finishing with a double-double.

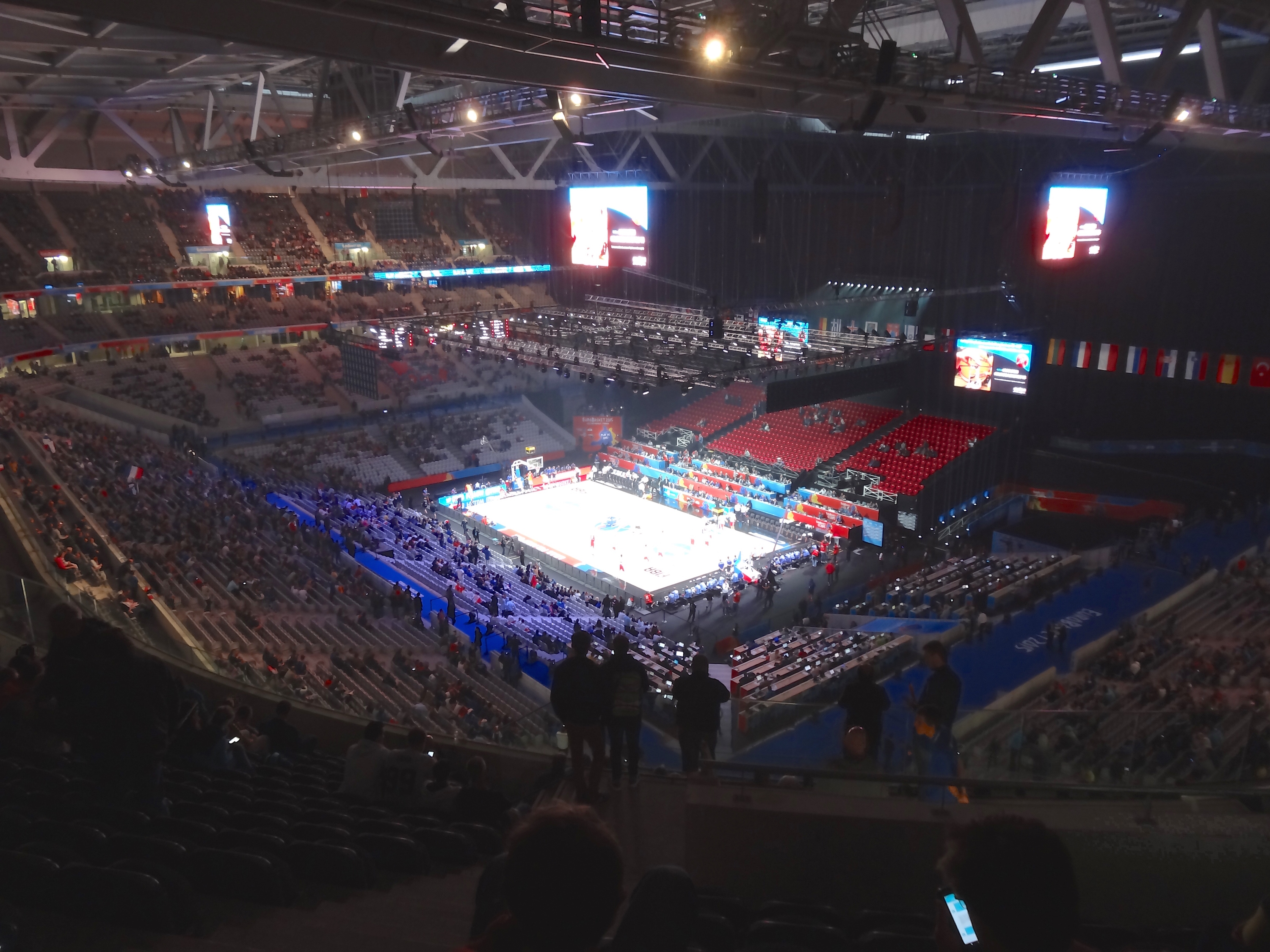
Stade Pierre-Mauroy hosted the EuroBasket 2015 Final, where Lithuanians won their second consecutive silver medals in front of a European basketball record 27,372 spectators.

"I'm proud that I represent Lithuania. I was working with the Greece, China national teams. With Greeks we won the European championship bronze. There you reach victories, you rejoice, you are proud of you work, but then is no such emotions, such tension, you don't consume so many nerves like here."

— Jonas Kazlauskas, about the feeling to represent Lithuania.

At the eightfinal Jonas Mačiulis continued to carry the stagnating Lithuania national team over his shoulders past Georgia, 85–81. The game again was a true thriller, with the Lithuanian squad leading just 80–79 during the final 15 seconds before Mačiulis secured victory by hammering an important three-pointer with just a few seconds remaining on the shot clock. Mačiulis had the greatest number of EFF Points in EuroBasket history with 50 points in that game (34 points with 85% accuracy, 6 rebounds, 3 assists, 4 steals and 2 blocks), being the first player to hit the 50 point mark since Dirk Nowitzki's 52 in the 2001 bronze medal game. At the quarterfinal Lithuania, just like two years ago, faced Italy, led by such prominent NBA players like Danilo Gallinari, Marco Belinelli and Andrea Bargnani. The game was so intense that it required an overtime, in which the Lithuania national team turned a higher gear, with three players scoring double-doubles (Jonas Valančiūnas, Jonas Mačiulis and Mantas Kalnietis) en route to a 95–85 that gave Lithuania their third straight semifinal. Following the game, Mačiulis said: "We won, but there are only three medals sets. We have to win one of these". The semifinal was a true European basketball classic: Lithuania versus Serbia, coached by Aleksandar Đorđević, who led the then-Yugoslavia to beat Lithuania in the 1995 EuroBasket final. The Lithuanians were considered underdogs of the match due to the Serbians being undefeated that far while the Balts struggled in all games. Still, Lithuania led for most of the time, at times with advantages of 11 points, and while the Serbians scored 21 points in the final quarter, clinched the semifinal with a 67–64 score, advancing into their second straight EuroBasket final. Furthermore, the victory also automatically put the Lithuania men's national team to the 2016 Summer Olympics, their seventh consecutive Olympics, and making Lithuania the only European squad in all Olympics since 1992. Coach Jonas Kazlauskas described the victory as "unbelievable", given Lithuania only scored 2 three-pointers while making 20 turnovers. Wild celebrations ensued in the streets of Lithuania after the conclusion of the game.

While none of the Lithuanians playing in the EuroBasket 2015 Final were part of the team who won the 2003 tournament, the adversary was the same, a Spanish team led by Pau Gasol and featuring Felipe Reyes, as well as two of the referees, Luigi Lamonica and Ilija Belošević. And this time, the final went absolutely different, with Spain hitting with stunning accuracy right from the 19–8 first quarter. The Lithuanian squad tried to reduce the deficit multiple times, but the Spanish kept the lead at all times for an 80–63 win. Jonas Valančiūnas and Jonas Mačiulis were selected to the All-Tournament Team, but were visibly unhappy at losing the second straight European championship final. Yet on the next day, the national team members, as in the previous years, were warmly greeted at the Town Hall in Vilnius by a smiling crowd. On 22 September, the team was invited to the Presidential Palace, where they were awarded with more state awards.

=== 2016 Rio Summer Olympics ===
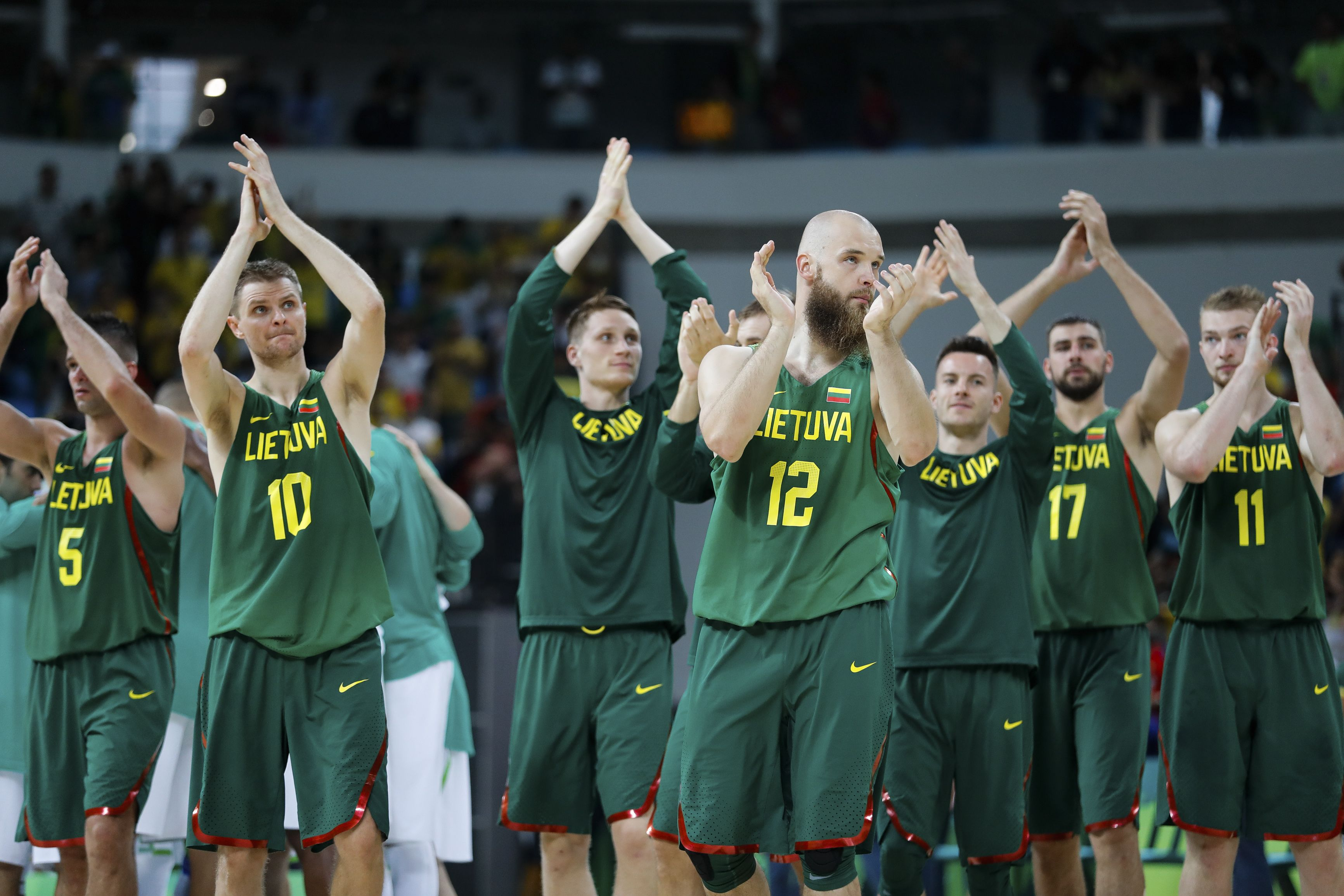
The 2016 Olympic Team members thanking fans for their support

The Lithuanian men's national team automatically qualified into the 2016 Summer Olympics without the need to compete in the qualifying tournament after being finalists of EuroBasket 2015. Lithuania, China, Australia and the United States are the only countries to compete in consecutive Olympiad since 1992. On 8 June, the twenty candidates list was published, who were invited to the training camp. On 20 June, first training camp was held. During the first preparation phase in Lithuania, the national team reached 5 of 5 victories, including victory versus the European champions Spain national team in a farewell game 87–83 in Kaunas. Just three days later, Lithuanians reached another victory over Spain 76–78 in Málaga. The preparation stage in South America was less fortunate with the first game being cancelled due to unsuitable conditions, then the first loss occurred to Argentina after controversial refereeing. The only victory there was achieved versus Australia 68–81. The friendly games were finished with another loss, this time to Brazil 64–62.

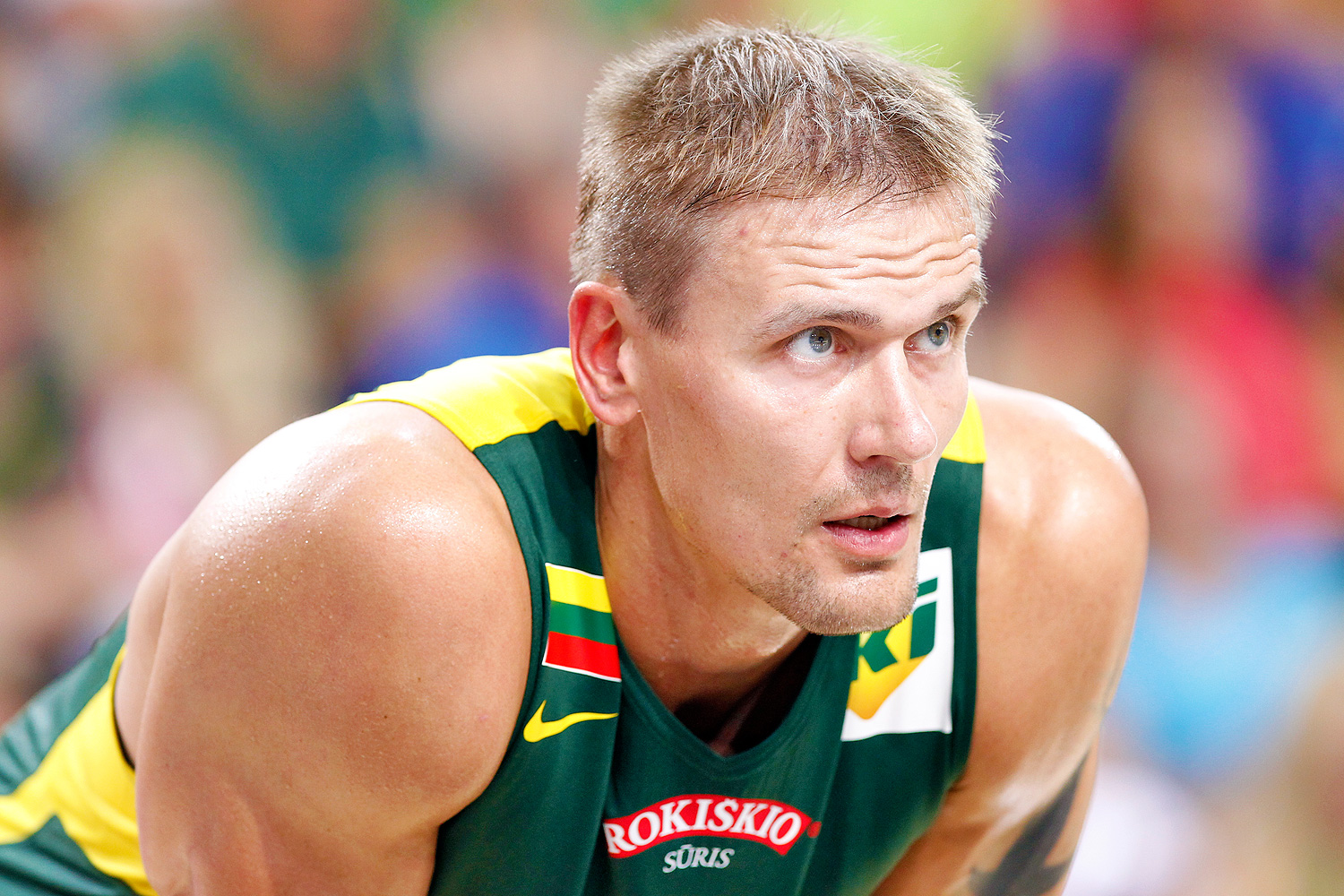
After spending eleven summers with the national team, Robertas Javtokas retired from the team in 2016.

On 7 August, the opening game versus the host team Brazil national team was played. After demonstrating powerful game-play in the beginning, Lithuanians won the first half by 29 points (58–29), though the second half was completely different, which was surprisingly lost by 23 points. Lithuania won the game just 76–82. After the game, one of the team leaders Jonas Mačiulis said that "this can't happen again". Following it, Lithuania faced Nigeria national team. After playing two quarters point-to-point, Lithuanians spurt in the third (29–13), led by Mačiulis who scored 14 points during it, and won the match 89–80. Afterwards, Lithuanians overcome Argentina national team, who was yet undefeated in a close game 81–73 and qualified for the quarterfinal. The successful start was slowed down by Spain national team, which crushed Lithuania 59–109. It was second highest loss in the history of the Lithuanian national team history. The group phase was ended with another loss to Croatia national team 81–90 and Lithuania finished third in the group.

The quarterfinals adversary were Australia, who Lithuania beat to win the last two bronze medals. This time the "Boomers" did not give a chance to Lithuania, leading all the way to a 90–64 rout with strong performances by Patty Mills and Matthew Dellavedova. Lithuania finished seventh in the final standings. Following the Olympics, long-time captain Robertas Javtokas retired from the national team. After a successful 4-year lap, head coach Jonas Kazlauskas refused to return to the national team for more summers and left it for a second time. On 25 October 2016, he was replaced by Dainius Adomaitis. On 20 January 2017, EuroLeague legend and former Lithuanian star Ramūnas Šiškauskas was named one of Adomaitis's assistants.

=== EuroBasket 2017 ===
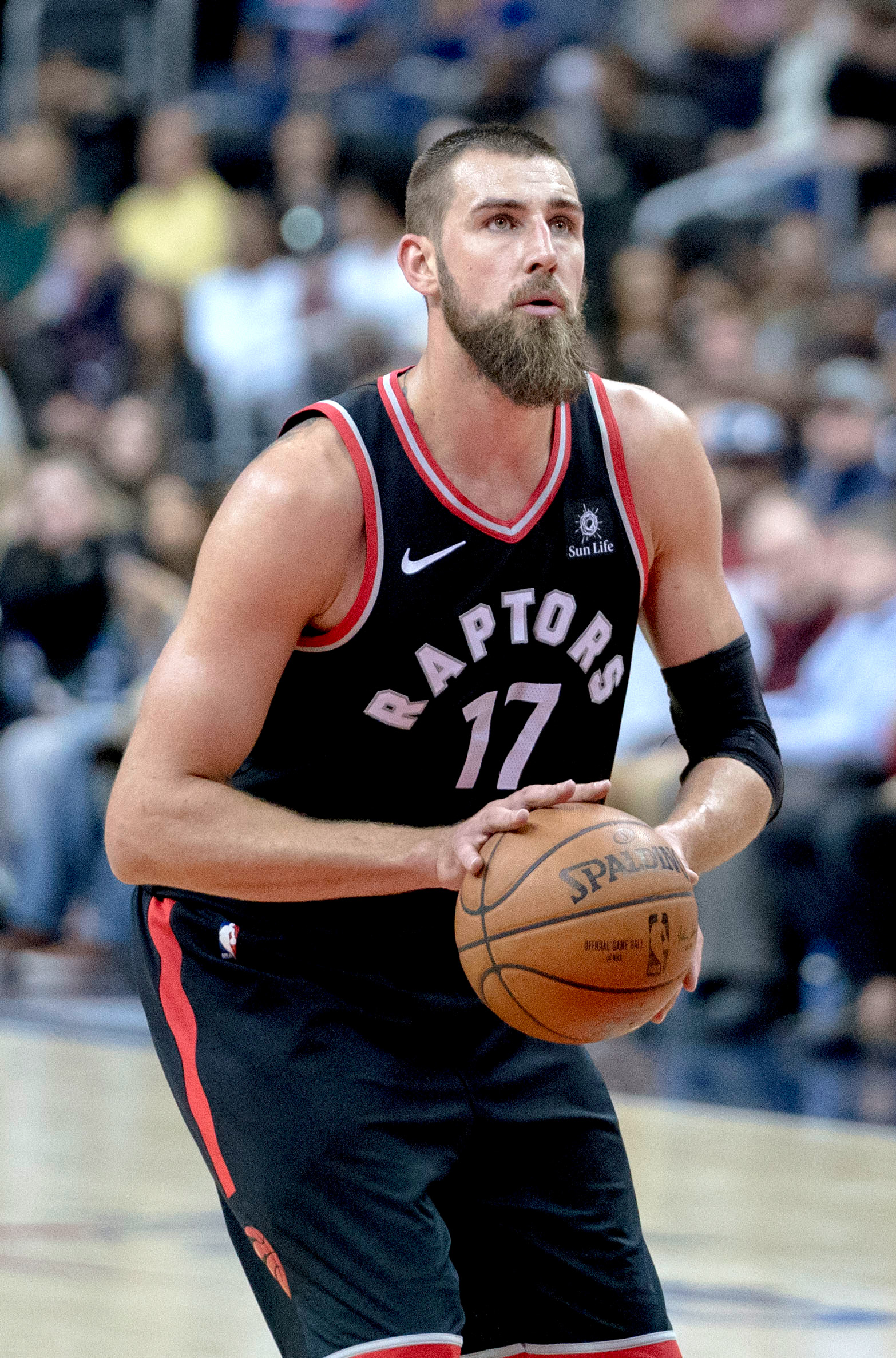
In 2017, Jonas Valančiūnas became the vital piece of the team.

On 11 May 2017, Dainius Adomaitis announced the extended candidates list. On 16 June, the shortened candidates list version was published, which most notably excluded Antanas Kavaliauskas, Paulius Jankūnas and Renaldas Seibutis. On 20 June, one of four Lithuanian NBA players Domantas Sabonis, son of all-time great Arvydas Sabonis, announced that he would not represent the national team this year. On 21 June, the national team members gathered for their first training camp in Palanga. On 1 August, Mantas Kalnietis was chosen captain of the team.

Atmosphere during the farewell game in Siemens Arena.

The preparation games were started by barely defeating the Poland national team 59–58 on 4 August, and with a loss to the Georgia national team 81–70 on 5 August. Following it, the team traveled to Orléans, France, to participate in a not more fortunate international tournament, losing both games to the Croatia national team 80–82 and to the France national team 77–98. On 18 August, Lithuanians reached their second victory by crushing Romania national team 97–64 in Riga, but were convincingly defeated by the Latvia national team 77–87 on the next day, mostly due to the youngsters Dāvis Bertāns and Kristaps Porziņģis. After returning to Lithuania, the team's final roster was announced on 23 August; however, during the team's next-to-last warmup game before EuroBasket, against Iceland national team, Lukas Lekavičius suffered a broken foot that kept him out of the tournament and diminished the 84–62 victory. He was replaced on the roster by Adas Juškevičius. The farewell game was played on 25 August in Vilnius, and was lost during the final seconds 78–79.

On 29 August, Lithuania national team traveled to Tel Aviv, Israel for the group-phase games of the EuroBasket 2017. The group-phase was started with a shocking 77–79 loss to the Georgia national team, with Tornike Shengelia scoring 29 points and dominating the game. Although, Lithuanians rehabilitated later by defeating the hosts Israel national team 73–88, Italy national team 78–73 after Juškevičius career-best performance, Ukraine national team 62–94, and Germany national team 72–89 with Valančiūnas powerfully dominating during both games. The successful finish resulted in Lithuania clinching the first place in the group with a 4–1 result. On 7 September, Lithuanians departed to Istanbul for the knockout stage. The intention to win third straight EuroBasket medals was quickly smashed by the Greece national team 64–77 in the first round, with Lithuanians trailing most of the game and failing to defend Kostas Sloukas. Consequently, this time Lithuanians finished ninth. On 10 September, part of the national team returned to Vilnius.

=== 2019 FIBA World Cup qualification ===
Contrary to previous years, no teams were automatically placed into the FIBA World Cup, so all FIBA Europe nations had to participate in qualifications. On 3 November 2017, the national team candidates list was published that did not included any NBA or EuroLeague players. On 20 November 2017, the national team members arrived to Palanga, and on 23 November the team has traveled to Pristina, Kosovo from the Palanga International Airport for their first qualification game versus the Kosovo national team in the Palace of Youth and Sports. Lithuania won the game 61–99 by starting to crush the Kosovans in the third quarter. On 26 November 2017, Lithuanians also crushed their second opponent Poland national team 75–55 in Klaipėda to perfectly finish the first phase of the group stage. On 2 February 2018, list of the roster for the second qualification window was published. On 19 February 2018, the team gathered in Palanga. On 23 February 2018, Lithuanians narrowly defeated Hungary 80–75 in Klaipėda. On 26 February 2018, they crushed Kosovo yet again. On 31 May 2018, list of the roster for the third qualification window was published, which included Lithuanian NBA and EuroLeague players. On 25 June 2018, the strengthened team gathered in Kaunas. It crushed Poland in Gdańsk 79–61 and Hungary in Budapest 73–50. On 3 September 2018, team roster for the fourth qualification window was announced. Prior to the qualification games, Lithuania national team lost a friendly game to the Latvia national team 80–97, but later after defeating the Croatia national team 84–83 in Osijek and Netherlands national team 95–93 in Vilnius it qualified to the 2019 FIBA World Cup in China.

=== 2019 Military World Games ===
The Lithuanian men's national basketball team participated in the 2019 Military World Games where they won the Gold medal match against Team USA, with Team China finishing-off in the Bronze medal position.

== Competitive record ==
=== FIBA World Cup ===
World Cup					Qualification		
Year	Position	Pld	W	L	Pld	W	L
1950 to 1990	Part of Soviet Union						
(Canada) 1994	Did not qualify				EuroBasket served as qualifiers		
(Greece) 1998	7th	9	5	4	EuroBasket served as qualifiers		
(United States) 2002	Did not qualify				EuroBasket served as qualifiers		
(Japan) 2006	7th	9	5	4	EuroBasket served as qualifiers		
(Turkey) 2010	3rd place, bronze medalist(s)	9	8	1	EuroBasket served as qualifiers		
(Spain) 2014	4th	9	6	3	EuroBasket served as qualifiers		
(China) 2019	9th	5	3	2	12	11	1
(Philippines) (Japan) (Indonesia) 2023	6th	8	6	2	12	9	3
(Qatar) 2027	To be determined				To be determined		
(France) 2031	To be determined				To be determined		
Total	6/8	49	33	16	24	20	4

=== Olympic Games ===
Olympic Games					Qualifying		
Year	Position	Pld	W	L	Pld	W	L
(Germany) 1936	Did not participate						
1940 to 1944	Not held due to World War II						
1948 to 1988	Part of Soviet Union						
(Spain) 1992	3rd place, bronze medalist(s)	8	6	2	11	11	0
(United States) 1996	3rd place, bronze medalist(s)	8	5	3	Directly qualified		
(Australia) 2000	3rd place, bronze medalist(s)	8	5	3	Directly qualified		
(Greece) 2004	4th	8	6	2	Directly qualified		
(China) 2008	4th	8	5	3	Directly qualified		
(United Kingdom) 2012	8th	6	2	4	4	3	1
(Brazil) 2016	7th	6	3	3	Directly qualified		
(Japan) 2020	Did not qualify				4	3	1
(France) 2024	Did not qualify				4	3	1
(United States) 2028	To be determined				To be determined		
Total	7/10	52	32	20	23	20	3

=== EuroBasket ===
EuroBasket					Qualification		
Year	Position	Pld	W	L	Pld	W	L
(Switzerland) 1935	Did not participate						
(Latvia) 1937	1st place, gold medalist(s)	5	5	0			
(Lithuania) 1939	1st place, gold medalist(s)	7	7	0			
(Lithuania) 1941	Not held due to World War II						
1946 to 1989	Part of Soviet Union						
(Germany) 1993	Did not qualify				2	1	1
(Greece) 1995	2nd place, silver medalist(s)	9	7	2	11	9	2
(Spain) 1997	6th	9	5	4	10	6	4
(France) 1999	5th	9	7	2	10	8	2
(Turkey) 2001	12th	4	2	2	Directly qualified		
(Sweden) 2003	1st place, gold medalist(s)	6	6	0	10	9	1
(Serbia and Montenegro) 2005	5th	6	5	1	Directly qualified		
(Spain) 2007	3rd place, bronze medalist(s)	9	8	1	Directly qualified		
(Poland) 2009	11th	6	1	5	Directly qualified		
(Lithuania) 2011	5th	11	8	3	Qualified as host		
(Slovenia) 2013	2nd place, silver medalist(s)	11	8	3	Directly qualified		
(France) (Croatia) (Germany) (Latvia) 2015	2nd place, silver medalist(s)	9	7	2	Directly qualified		
(Finland) (Israel) (Romania) (Turkey) 2017	9th	6	4	2	Directly qualified		
(Czech Republic) (Georgia (country)) (Italy) (Germany) 2022	15th	6	2	4	6	4	2
(Cyprus) (Finland) (Poland) (Latvia) 2025	5th	7	5	2	6	5	1
(Estonia) (Greece) (Slovenia) (Spain) 2029	To be determined				To be determined		
Total	16/18	120	87	33	55	42	13

== Results and fixtures ==
Win Loss

=== 2025 ===
27 November 2025 2027 FIBA World Cup qualifiers – 1st round	Great Britain	88–89	Lithuania	London, England
19:30 (UTC+0)	Scoring by quarter: 21–16, 30–22, 16–30, 21–21
	Pts: Hesson, Wheatle 18; Rebs: Hesson 8 Asts: Hesson 5	Boxscore	Pts: Sargiūnas 27; Rebs: Velička 10; Asts: three players 4	Arena: Copper Box Arena; Attendance: 2,809; Referees: Gatis Saliņš (LAT), Marius Ciulin (ROU), Elvis Binders-Čoders (LAT)

30 November 2025 2027 FIBA World Cup qualifiers – 1st round	Lithuania	81–82	Italy	Klaipėda, Lithuania
18:30 EET (UTC+2)	Scoring by quarter: 19–16, 20–18, 15–20, 27–28
	Pts: Sargiūnas 18; Rebs: Blaževič 13; Asts: Velička 7	Boxscore	Pts: Procida 24; Rebs: Tessitori 5 Asts: Casarin 5	Arena: Švyturys Arena; Attendance: 5,011; Referees: Yohan Rosso (FRA), Josip Jurčević (CRO), Valentin Oliot (FRA)

=== 2026 ===
27 February 2026 2027 FIBA World Cup qualifiers – 1st round	Iceland	86–85	Lithuania	Reykjavík, Iceland
19:30 (UTC+0)	Scoring by quarter: 24–21, 19–23, 11–24, 32–17
	Pts: Friðriksson 34; Rebs: Hlinason 5 Asts: Friðriksson 6	Boxscore	Pts: Blaževič 19; Rebs: Blaževič 11; Asts: Žemaitis 6	Arena: Laugardalshöll; Attendance: 1,886; Referees: Boris Krejić (SVN), Yener Yılmaz (TUR), Alberto Sánchez (ESP)

2 March 2026 2027 FIBA World Cup qualifiers – 1st round	Lithuania	99–82	Iceland	Klaipėda, Lithuania
18:30 EET (UTC+2)	Scoring by quarter: 26–12, 26–19, 27–23, 20–26
	Pts: Brazdeikis 27; Rebs: Kačinas 7 Asts: Žemaitis 5	Boxscore	Pts: Pálsson 23; Rebs: Guðmundsson 8 Asts: Friðriksson 8	Arena: Švyturys Arena; Attendance: 5,079; Referees: Ademir Zurapović (BIH), Fernando Calatrava (ESP), Mehmet Şahin (TUR)

2 July 2026 2027 FIBA World Cup qualifiers – 1st round	Lithuania	105–85	Great Britain	Klaipėda, Lithuania
18:30 EEST (UTC+3)	Scoring by quarter: 36–28, 23–13, 21–24, 25–20
	Pts: Tubelis 21; Rebs: Valančiūnas 11; Asts: Jakučionis 8	Boxscore	Pts: Hesson 22; Rebs: Olaseni 6 Asts: Nelson, Wheatle 6	Arena: Švyturys Arena; Attendance: 5,288; Referees: Georgios Poursanidis (GRE), Zdenko Tomašovič (SVK), Blaž Zupančič (SVN)

5 July 2026 2027 FIBA World Cup qualifiers – 1st round	Italy	87–84	Lithuania	Bologna, Italy
20:00 CEST (UTC+2)	Scoring by quarter: 22–25, 18–12, 19–24, 28–23
	Pts: Mannion 27; Rebs: Akele 7 Asts: Mannion 5	Boxscore	Pts: Tubelis 25; Rebs: Tubelis 12; Asts: Brazdeikis 5	Arena: Virtus Arena; Attendance: 4,500; Referees: Antonio Conde (ESP), Valentin Oliot (FRA), Elvis Binders-Čoders (LTU)

28 August 2026 2027 FIBA World Cup qualifiers – 2nd round	Turkey	94–66	Lithuania	Istanbul, Turkey
21:00 (UTC+3)	Scoring by quarter: 27–13, 28–21, 20–13, 19–19
	Pts: Osman 22; Rebs: Bona 7 Asts: Hazer 6	Boxscore	Pts: Olisevičius 11; Rebs: Blaževič 14; Asts: Stenionis 6	Arena: Turkcell Basketball Development Center; Attendance: 5,921; Referees: Wojciech Liszka (POL), Fernando Calatrava (ESP), Josip Jurčević (CRO)

31 August 2026 2027 FIBA World Cup qualifiers – 2nd round	Lithuania	78–73	Bosnia and Herzegovina	Vilnius, Lithuania
18:30 EEST (UTC+3)	Scoring by quarter: 20–23, 22–23, 19–12, 17–15
	Pts: Tubelis 23; Rebs: Blaževič 6 Asts: Marčiulionis, Žemaitis 5	Boxscore	Pts: Nurkić 20; Rebs: Kamenjaš 9 Asts: Atić 6	Arena: Arena Vilnius; Attendance: 4,989; Referees: Yohan Rosso (FRA), Mihkel Männiste (EST), Geert Jacobs (BEL)

26 November 2026 2027 FIBA World Cup qualifiers – 2nd round	Lithuania	vs.	Serbia	Klaipėda, Lithuania
18:30 EET (UTC+2)
		Boxscore		Arena: Švyturys Arena

29 November 2026 2027 FIBA World Cup qualifiers – 2nd round	Bosnia and Herzegovina	vs.	Lithuania	Sarajevo, Bosnia and Herzegovina
18:00 CET (UTC+1)
		Boxscore		Arena: Zetra Sports Hall

=== 2027 ===
26 February 2027 2027 FIBA World Cup qualifiers – 2nd round	Lithuania	vs.	Turkey	Lithuania
--:-- EET (UTC+2)
		Boxscore

1 March 2027 2027 FIBA World Cup qualifiers – 2nd round	Serbia	vs.	Lithuania	Serbia
--:-- CET (UTC+1)
		Boxscore

== Team ==
Roster for the 2027 FIBA Basketball World Cup Qualification

Lithuania men's national basketball team roster
Players
Coaches

Pos.	No.	Name	Age – Date of birth	Height	Club	Ctr.
C	1	Marek Blaževič	23 – 1 September 2001	2.09 m (6 ft 10 in)	Žalgiris	(Lithuania)
PG	3	Dominykas Stenionis	23 – 3 July 2002	1.79 m (5 ft 10 in)	Free agent
F	4	Justas Furmanavičius	30 – 14 September 1994	1.97 m (6 ft 6 in)	Utenos Juventus	(Lithuania)
G/F	7	Gytis Radzevičius	30 – 17 July 1995	1.97 m (6 ft 6 in)	Vilniaus Rytas	(Lithuania)
F	8	Osvaldas Olisevičius	32 – 10 January 1993	2.00 m (6 ft 7 in)	Trevizo NutriBullet	(Italy)
F/C	10	Ąžuolas Tubelis	23 – 22 March 2002	2.08 m (6 ft 10 in)	Žalgiris	(Lithuania)
C	20	Donatas Motiejūnas	35 – 20 September 1990	2.13 m (7 ft 0 in)	PAOK Thessaloniki	(Greece)
F/C	22	Regimantas Miniotas	29 – 14 March 1996	2.08 m (6 ft 10 in)	Victoria Libertas Pesaro	(Italy)
G/F	23	Matas Jogėla	27 – 10 July 1998	2.01 m (6 ft 7 in)	Vilniaus Rytas	(Lithuania)
G	30	Kristupas Žemaitis	29 – 24 June 1996	1.92 m (6 ft 4 in)	Neptūnas Klaipėda	(Lithuania)
PG	31	Augustas Marčiulionis	23 – 21 March 2002	1.93 m (6 ft 4 in)	Vilniaus Rytas	(Lithuania)
F	33	Mindaugas Kačinas	32 – 30 June 1993	2.03 m (6 ft 8 in)	Trefl Sopot	(Poland)

Head coach

- (Lithuania) Dainius Adomaitis

Assistant coach(es)

- (Lithuania) Benas Matkevičius
- (Lithuania) Mindaugas Brazys
- (Lithuania) Renaldas Seibutis

Legend

- (C) Team captain
- Club – describes last club
  before the tournament
- Age – describes age
  on 27 August 2025

=== Depth chart ===
Pos.	Starting 5	Bench 1	Bench 2
C	Marek Blaževič	Donatas Motiejūnas
PF	Ąžuolas Tubelis	Mindaugas Kačinas	Regimantas Miniotas
SF	Gytis Radzevičius	Osvaldas Olisevičius	Justas Furmanavičius
SG	Matas Jogėla	Kristupas Žemaitis
PG	Dominykas Stenionis	Augustas Marčiulionis

=== Best player award ===
Rank	Name	Club(s) played for	Previous best performance	Percent
2008
1	Ramūnas Šiškauskas	(Russia) CSKA Moscow	–	42.00%
2	Šarūnas Jasikevičius	(Greece) Panathinaikos	–	13.3%
3	Zydrunas Ilgauskas	(United States) Cleveland Cavaliers	–	11.2%
2009
1	Linas Kleiza	(Greece) Olympiacos	–	29.8%
2	Ramūnas Šiškauskas	(Russia) CSKA Moscow	Winner 2008	20.0%
3	Zydrunas Ilgauskas	(United States) Cleveland Cavaliers	3	8.0%
2010
1	Linas Kleiza	(Canada) Toronto Raptors	Winner 2009	43.1%
2	Martynas Pocius	(Lithuania) Žalgiris Kaunas	–	19.1%
3	Jonas Valančiūnas	(Lithuania) Lietuvos rytas Vilnius	–	13.7%
2011
1	Jonas Valančiūnas	(Lithuania) Lietuvos rytas Vilnius	3	31.9%
2	Rimantas Kaukėnas	(Italy) Montepaschi Siena	–	19.9%
3	Donatas Motiejūnas	(Poland) Asseco Prokom Gdynia	–	14.3%
2012
1	Jonas Valančiūnas	(Canada) Toronto Raptors	Winner 2011	37.6%
2	Renaldas Seibutis	(Lithuania) Lietuvos rytas Vilnius	–	11.4%
3	Linas Kleiza	(Canada) Toronto Raptors	Winner 2009, 2010	11.1%
2013
1	Mantas Kalnietis	(Russia) Lokomotiv Kuban Krasnodar	–	50.9%
2	Jonas Valančiūnas	(Canada) Toronto Raptors	Winner 2011, 2012	12.3%
3	Linas Kleiza	(Turkey) Fenerbahçe Ülker	Winner 2009,2010	7.1%
2014
1	Jonas Valančiūnas	(Canada) Toronto Raptors	Winner 2011, 2012	38.8%
2	Mantas Kalnietis	(Russia) Lokomotiv Kuban Krasnodar	Winner 2013	14.0%
3	Donatas Motiejūnas	(United States) Houston Rockets	3	12.6%
2015
1	Jonas Mačiulis	(Spain) Real Madrid	–	37.4%
2	Mindaugas Kuzminskas	(Spain) Unicaja Málaga	–	16.0%
3	Jonas Valančiūnas	(Canada) Toronto Raptors	Winner 2011, 2012, 2014	15.5%
2016
1	Mindaugas Kuzminskas	(United States) New York Knicks	2	27.0%
2	Mantas Kalnietis	(Italy) Olimpia Milano	Winner 2013	20.0%
3	Paulius Jankūnas	(Lithuania) Žalgiris Kaunas	–	13.0%
2017
1	Jonas Valančiūnas	(Canada) Toronto Raptors	Winner 2011, 2012, 2014	^{‡}
2	Domantas Sabonis	(United States) Indiana Pacers	–	
3	Paulius Jankūnas	(Lithuania) Žalgiris Kaunas	3	
2018
1	Domantas Sabonis	(United States) Indiana Pacers	2	^{‡}
2	Jonas Valančiūnas	(Canada) Toronto Raptors	Winner 2011, 2012, 2014, 2017	
3	Paulius Jankūnas	(Lithuania) Žalgiris Kaunas	3	
2019
1	Domantas Sabonis	(United States) Indiana Pacers	Winner 2018	^{‡}
2	Jonas Valančiūnas	(United States) Memphis Grizzlies	Winner 2011, 2012, 2014, 2017	
3	Marius Grigonis	(Lithuania) Žalgiris Kaunas	–	
2020
1	Domantas Sabonis	(United States) Indiana Pacers	Winner 2018, 2019	^{‡}
2	Marius Grigonis	(Lithuania) Žalgiris Kaunas	3	
3	Jonas Valančiūnas	(United States) Memphis Grizzlies	Winner 2011, 2012, 2014, 2017	
2021
1	Jonas Valančiūnas	(United States) New Orleans Pelicans	Winner 2011, 2012, 2014, 2017	3842
2	Domantas Sabonis	(United States) Indiana Pacers	Winner 2018, 2019, 2020	3436
3	Rokas Jokubaitis	(Spain) FC Barcelona	–	1424
2022
1	Domantas Sabonis	(United States) Sacramento Kings	Winner 2018, 2019, 2020	2840
2	Jonas Valančiūnas	(United States) New Orleans Pelicans	Winner 2011, 2012, 2014, 2017, 2021	2206
3	Ignas Brazdeikis	(Lithuania) Žalgiris Kaunas	–	490
2023
1	Jonas Valančiūnas	(United States) New Orleans Pelicans	Winner 2011, 2012, 2014, 2017, 2021	4196
2	Domantas Sabonis	(United States) Sacramento Kings	Winner 2018, 2019, 2020, 2022	3159
3	Tadas Sedekerskis	(Spain) Vitoria-Gasteiz	–	1273

=== Individual awards ===
==== International competitions ====
- EuroBasket MVP
  - Pranas Talzūnas – 1937
  - Mykolas Ruzgys – 1939
  - Šarūnas Marčiulionis – 1995
  - Šarūnas Jasikevičius – 2003
- EuroBasket All-Tournament Team
  - Pranas Talzūnas – 1937
  - Feliksas Kriaučiūnas – 1937, 1939
  - Mykolas Ruzgys – 1939
  - Vytautas Budriūnas – 1939
  - Šarūnas Marčiulionis – 1995
  - Arvydas Sabonis – 1995
  - Šarūnas Jasikevičius – 2003
  - Saulius Štombergas – 2003
  - Ramūnas Šiškauskas – 2007
  - Linas Kleiza – 2013
  - Jonas Mačiulis – 2015
  - Jonas Valančiūnas – 2015
- EuroBasket Top Scorer
  - Šarūnas Marčiulionis – 1995
- FIBA World Cup All-Tournament Team
  - Linas Kleiza – 2010
  - Jonas Valančiūnas – 2023

==== Other notable achievements ====
- FIBA Hall of Fame
  - Arvydas Sabonis
  - Šarūnas Marčiulionis
  - Modestas Paulauskas
- Mr. Europa
  - Arvydas Sabonis – 1997
  - Šarūnas Jasikevičius – 2003
- Euroscar
  - Arvydas Sabonis – 1995, 1997, 1999
- All-NBA Third team
  - Domantas Sabonis – 2023, 2024
- NBA All-Stars
  - Žydrūnas Ilgauskas – 2003, 2005
  - Domantas Sabonis – 2020, 2021, 2023
- NBA All-Rookie First Team
  - Arvydas Sabonis – 1996
  - Žydrūnas Ilgauskas – 1998
- NBA All-Rookie Second Team
  - Jonas Valančiūnas – 2013
- EuroLeague champion
  - Arvydas Sabonis – 1995
  - Saulius Štombergas – 1999
  - Dainius Adomaitis – 1999
  - Mindaugas Žukauskas – 1999
  - Eurelijus Žukauskas – 1999
  - Tomas Masiulis – 1999
  - Darius Maskoliūnas – 1999
  - Kęstutis Šeštokas – 1999
  - Šarūnas Jasikevičius – 2003, 2004, 2005, 2009
  - Robertas Javtokas – 2007
  - Ramūnas Šiškauskas – 2007, 2008
  - Martynas Gecevičius – 2012, 2013
  - Jonas Mačiulis – 2015
- EuroLeague MVP
  - Ramūnas Šiškauskas – 2008
- EuroLeague Final Four MVP
  - Arvydas Sabonis – 1995
  - Šarūnas Jasikevičius – 2005
- EuroLeague Rising Star
  - Rokas Jokubaitis – 2022
- EuroLeague Finals Top Scorer
  - Arvydas Sabonis – 1995
  - Artūras Karnišovas – 1996
  - Šarūnas Jasikevičius – 2005
- EuroLeague Top Scorer
  - Linas Kleiza – 2010
- EuroLeague rebounds leader
  - Arvydas Sabonis – 1993, 2004
- EuroLeague PIR leader
  - Arvydas Sabonis – 2004
- 50 Greatest EuroLeague Contributors (2008)
  - Arvydas Sabonis
  - Šarūnas Jasikevičius

=== Notable players ===
==== Players medal leaders ====
For a full list of all the medallists, see Medal winners in Lithuania national basketball team

Player	Lithuania career	Gold	Silver	Bronze	Total (min. 3 medals)
Saulius Štombergas	1993–2004	Gold medal	Silver medal	Bronze medal Bronze medal	4
Gintaras Einikis	1992–2002	–	Silver medal	Bronze medal Bronze medal Bronze medal	4
Robertas Javtokas	2001–2016	–	Silver medal Silver medal	Bronze medal Bronze medal	4
Jonas Mačiulis	2007–2021	–	Silver medal Silver medal	Bronze medal Bronze medal	4
Šarūnas Marčiulionis	1992–1996	–	Silver medal	Bronze medal Bronze medal	3
Rimas Kurtinaitis	1992–1997	–	Silver medal	Bronze medal Bronze medal	3
Artūras Karnišovas	1992–1999	–	Silver medal	Bronze medal Bronze medal	3
Arvydas Sabonis	1992–1999	–	Silver medal	Bronze medal Bronze medal	3
Eurelijus Žukauskas	1996–2004	Gold medal	–	Bronze medal Bronze medal	3
Ramūnas Šiškauskas	1999–2008	Gold medal	–	Bronze medal Bronze medal	3
Šarūnas Jasikevičius	1997–2012	Gold medal	–	Bronze medal Bronze medal	3
Darius Songaila	2000–2012	Gold medal	–	Bronze medal Bronze medal	3
Kšyštof Lavrinovič	2003–2018	Gold medal	Silver medal	Bronze medal	3
Paulius Jankūnas	2005–2019	–	Silver medal	Bronze medal Bronze medal	3
Linas Kleiza	2006–2013	–	Silver medal	Bronze medal Bronze medal	3
Mantas Kalnietis	2006–2021	–	Silver medal Silver medal	Bronze medal	3
Renaldas Seibutis	2010–2019	–	Silver medal Silver medal	Bronze medal	3

=== Coaching staff ===
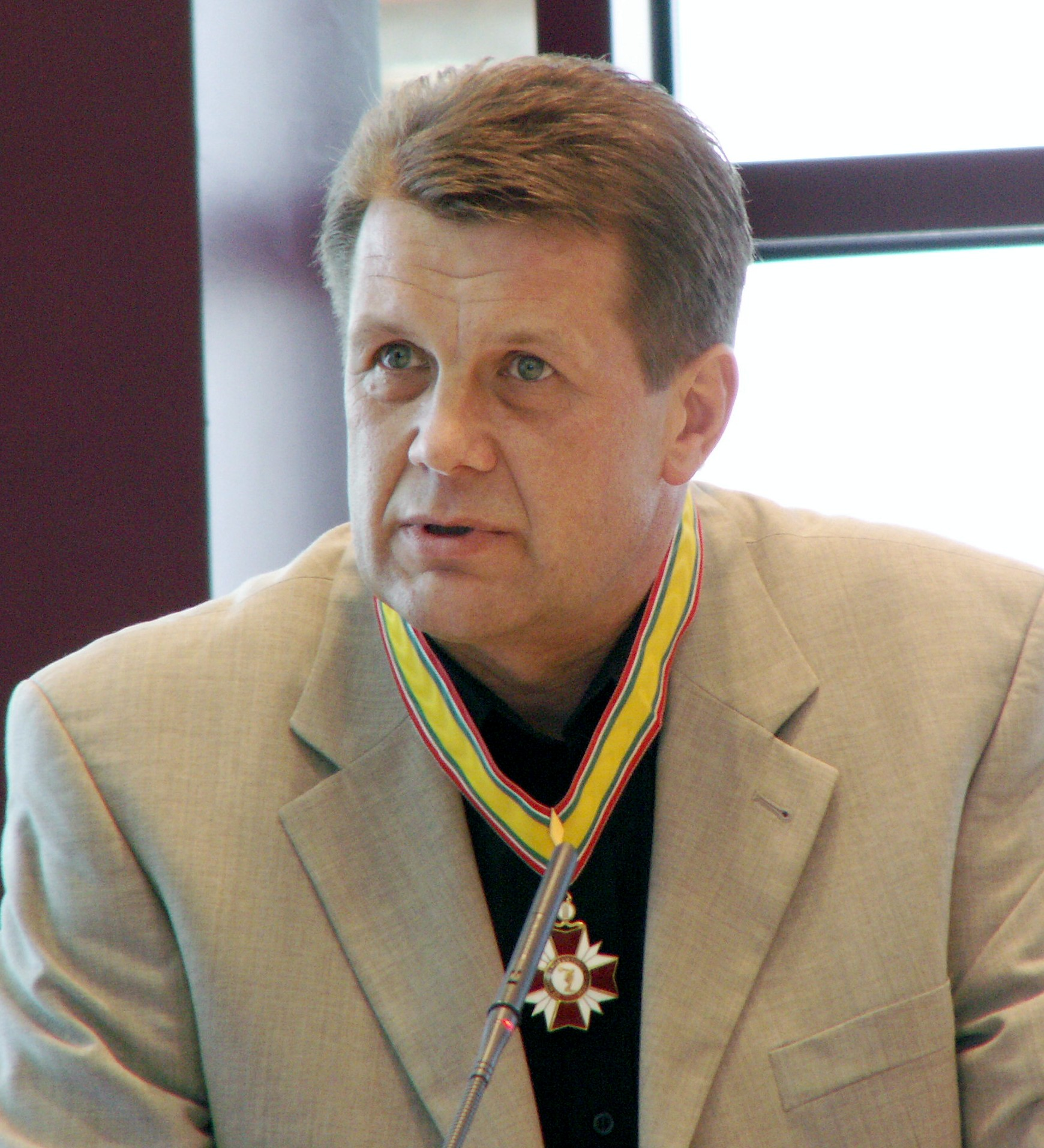
Antanas Sireika managed the team who won the European title in 2003.

Years	Coach	Competition
1992–1997	(Lithuania) Vladas Garastas	(bronze) 1992 Summer Olympics; (silver) 1995 EuroBasket; (bronze) 1996 Summer Olympics
1997–2001	(Lithuania) Jonas Kazlauskas	6th 1997 EuroBasket; 7th 1998 World Cup; 5th 1999 EuroBasket; (bronze) 2000 Summer Olympics; 12th 2001 EuroBasket
2001–2006	(Lithuania) Antanas Sireika	(gold) 2003 EuroBasket; 4th 2004 Summer Olympics; 5th 2005 EuroBasket; 7th 2006 World Cup
2007–2009	(Lithuania) Ramūnas Butautas	(bronze) 2007 EuroBasket; 4th 2008 Summer Olympics; 11th 2009 EuroBasket
2009–2012	(Lithuania) Kęstutis Kemzūra	(bronze) 2010 World Cup; 5th 2011 EuroBasket; 8th 2012 Summer Olympics
2012–2016	(Lithuania) Jonas Kazlauskas	(silver) 2013 EuroBasket; 4th 2014 World Cup; (silver) 2015 EuroBasket; 7th 2016 Summer Olympics
2016–2019	(Lithuania) Dainius Adomaitis	9th 2017 EuroBasket; 9th 2019 World Cup
2019–2021	(Lithuania) Darius Maskoliūnas	
2021–2024	(Lithuania) Kazys Maksvytis	15th 2022 EuroBasket; 6th 2023 World Cup
2024–2026	(Lithuania) Rimas Kurtinaitis	5th 2025 EuroBasket

Notable assistant coaches include:

- Javier Imbroda, Spanish, helped Lithuania earn its first medal shortly after independence at Barcelona 1992 Olympics.
- Donnie Nelson, American, son of Hall of Famer coach Don Nelson, helped Lithuania's funding for Barcelona 1992 and became assistant coach for many years later. After Lithuania nearly upset the US at Sydney 2000, Nelson declared that he would never help Lithuania in matches against the USA.
- Juozas Petkevičius has been with the national team in most competitions since the restoration of independence. Commonly called Juozukas, relates well with fans, players, and staff members, and is widely regarded as the mascot of the team.

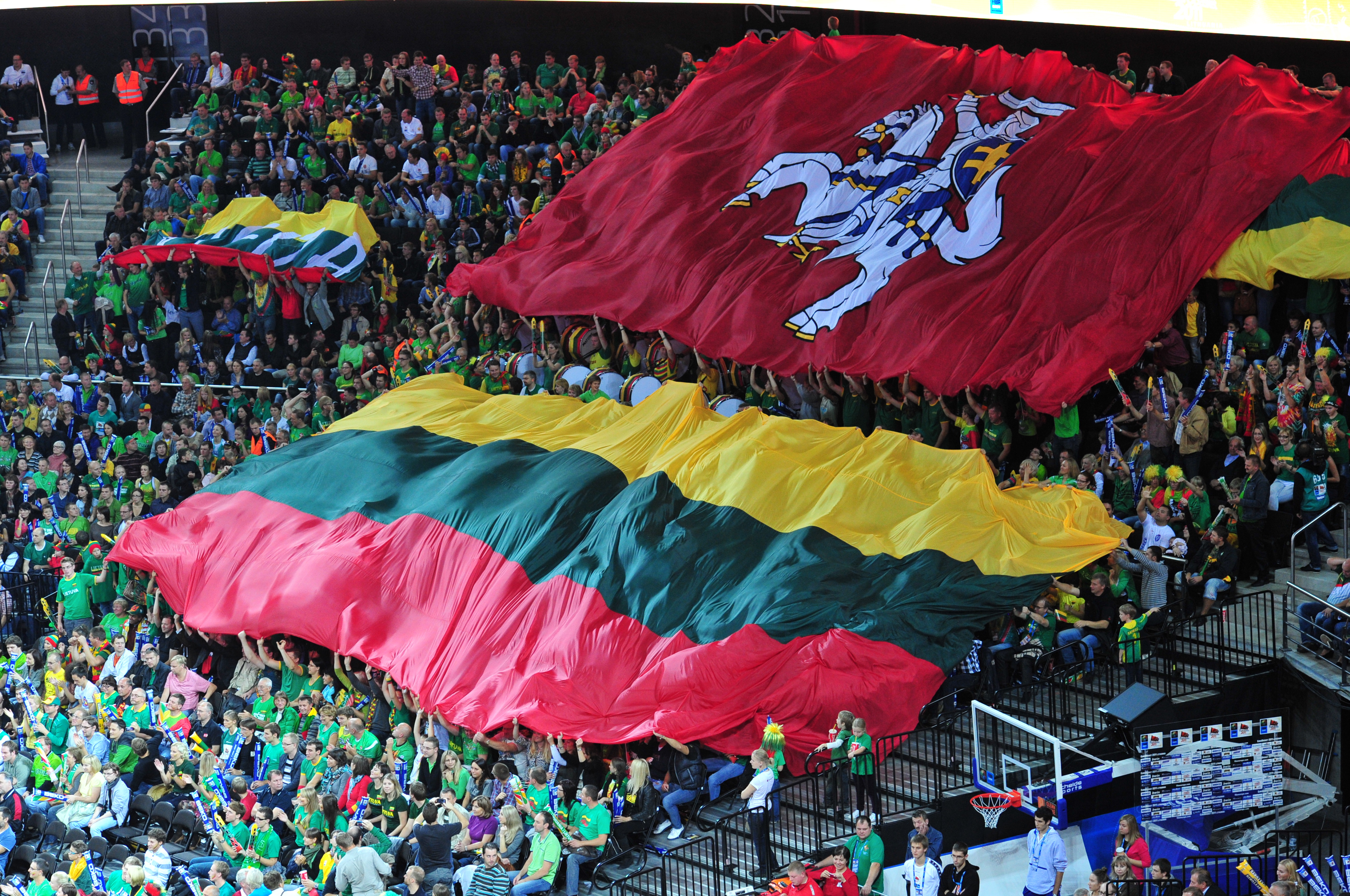
Lithuanian fans displaying the national and historical Vytis flags during EuroBasket 2011

=== Past rosters ===
1937 EuroBasket: finished (gold) among 8 teams

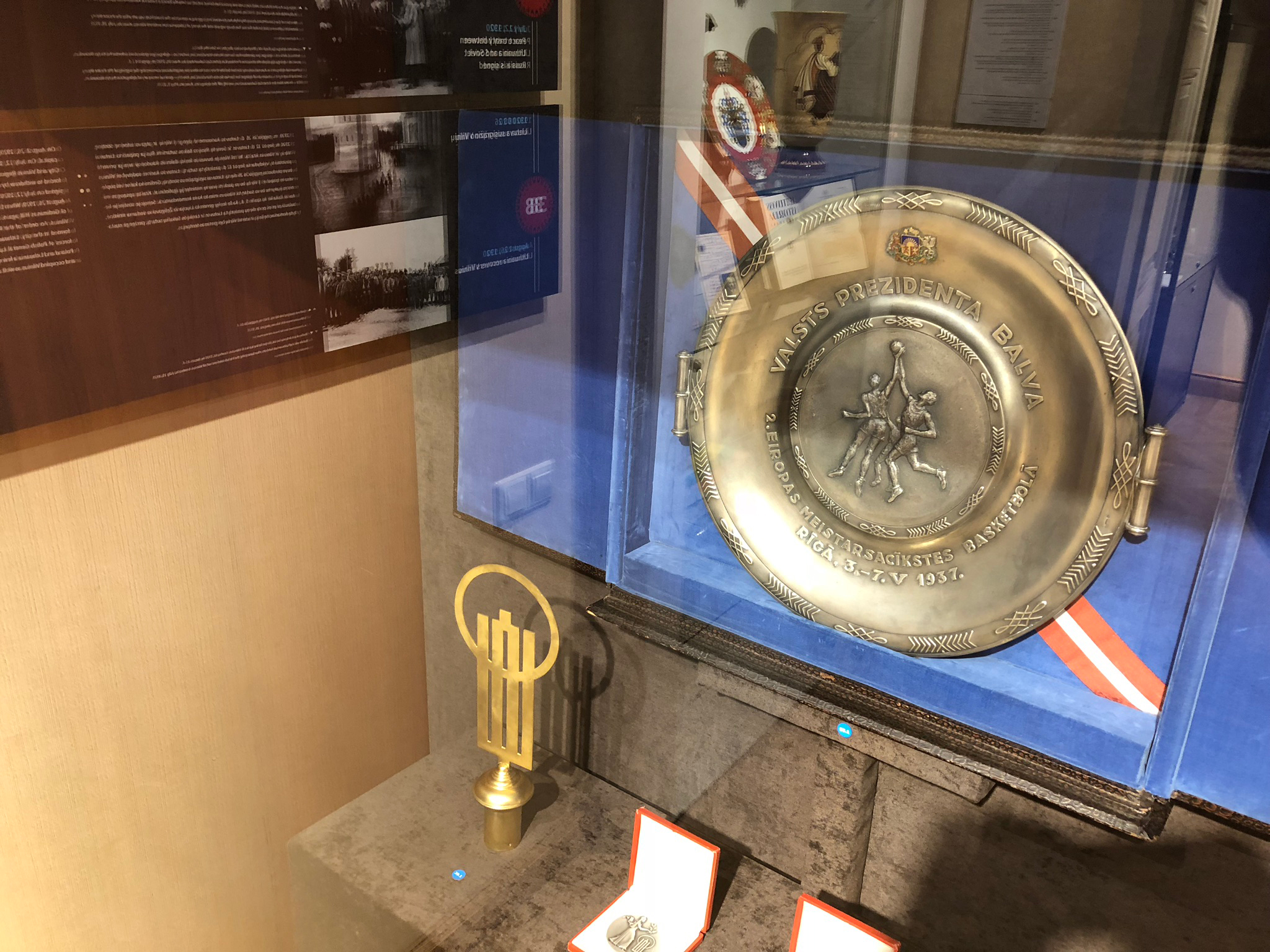
EuroBasket 1937 trophy at the Historical Presidential Palace, Kaunas

Artūras Andrulis, Leonas Baltrūnas, Pranas Talzūnas, Leopoldas Kepalas, Feliksas Kriaučiūnas, Pranas Mažeika, Eugenijus Nikolskis, Leonas Petrauskas, Zenonas Puzinauskas, Stasys Šačkus, Juozas Žukas, Česlovas Daukša (Coach: Feliksas Kriaučiūnas)

1939 EuroBasket: finished (gold) among 8 teams

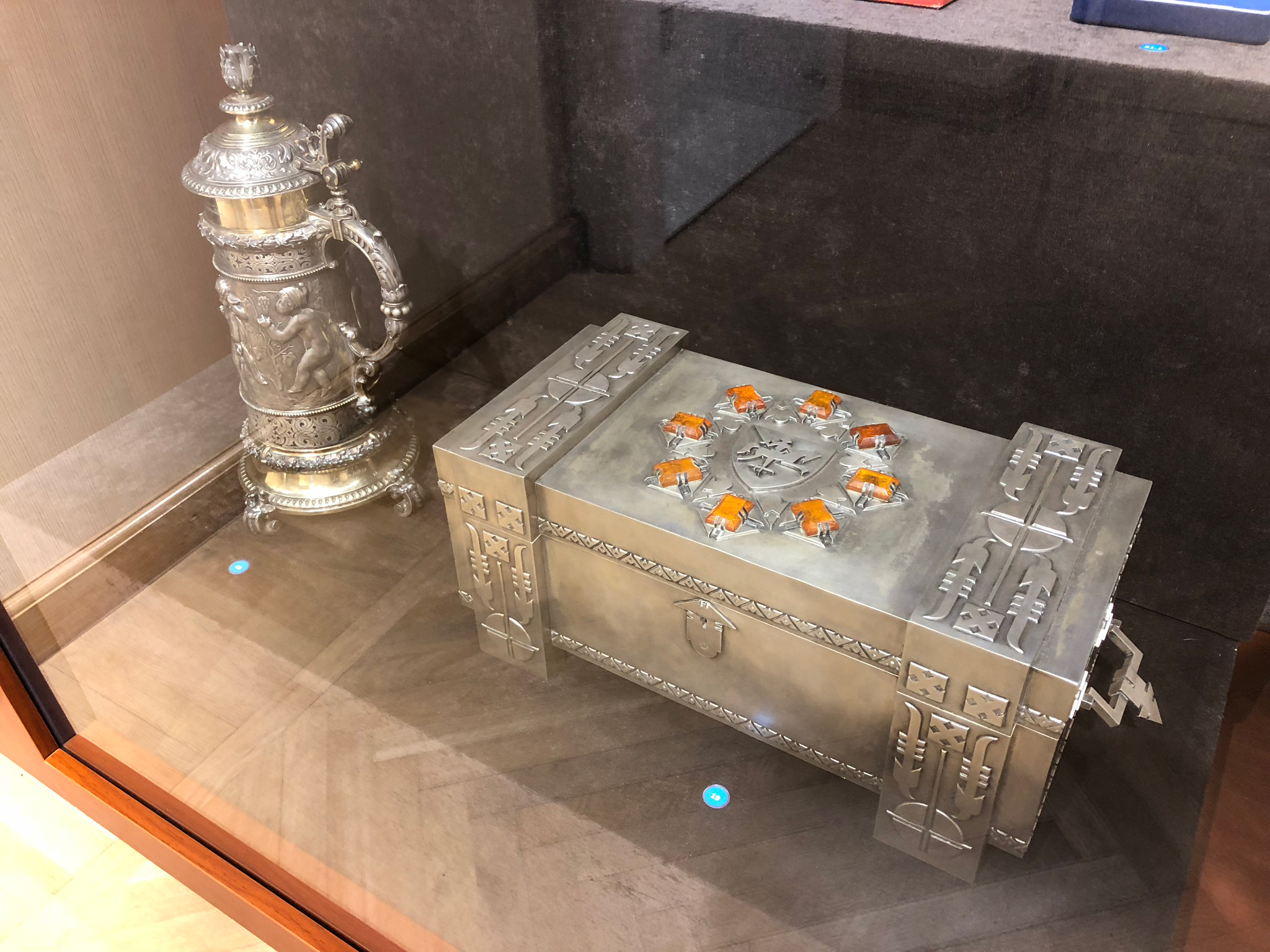
EuroBasket 1939 trophy (right)

Pranas Lubinas, Mykolas Ruzgys, Leonas Baltrūnas, Artūras Andrulis, Juozas Jurgėla, Pranas Mažeika, Vytautas Norkus, Vytautas Budriūnas, Zenonas Puzinauskas, Feliksas Kriaučiūnas, Vytautas Lesčinskas, Eugenijus Nikolskis, Leonas Petrauskas, Mindaugas Šliūpas (Coach: Pranas Lubinas)

1992 Olympic Games: finished (bronze) among 12 teams

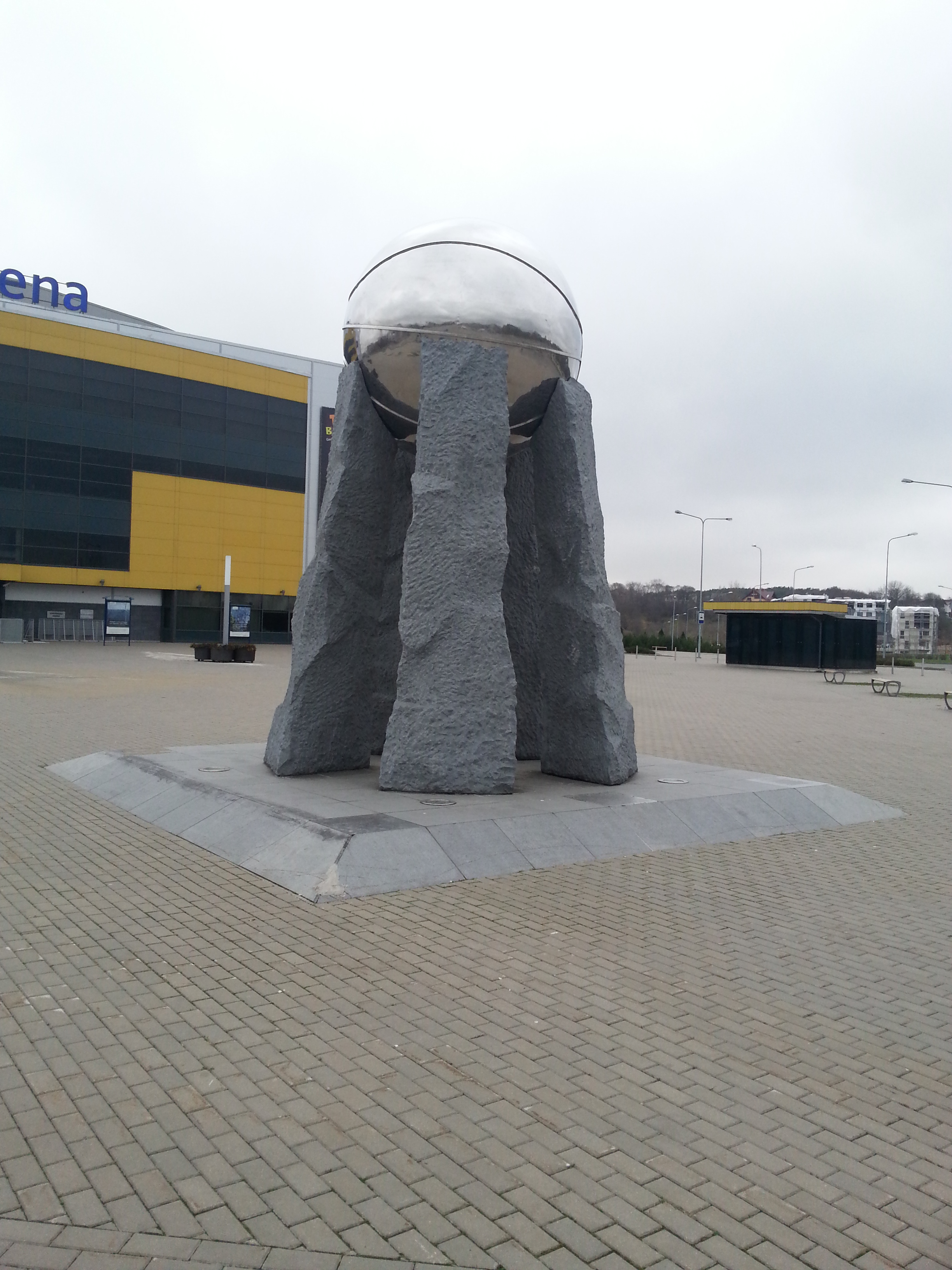
Monument to basketball in Vilnius

Arvydas Sabonis, Šarunas Marčiulionis, Valdemaras Chomičius, Rimas Kurtinaitis, Sergejus Jovaiša, Artūras Karnišovas, Gintaras Einikis, Arūnas Visockas, Darius Dimavičius, Romanas Brazdauskis, Gintaras Krapikas, Alvydas Pazdrazdis (Coach: Vladas Garastas)

1995 EuroBasket: finished (silver) among 14 teams

Arvydas Sabonis, Šarūnas Marčiulionis, Artūras Karnišovas, Rimas Kurtinaitis, Valdemaras Chomičius, Gintaras Einikis, Arūnas Visockas, Gintaras Krapikas, Saulius Štombergas, Mindaugas Timinskas, Darius Lukminas, Gvidonas Markevičius (Coach: Vladas Garastas)

1996 Olympic Games: finished (bronze) among 12 teams

Arvydas Sabonis, Šarūnas Marčiulionis, Artūras Karnišovas, Rimas Kurtinaitis, Saulius Štombergas, Gintaras Einikis, Darius Lukminas, Rytis Vaišvila, Tomas Pačėsas, Eurelijus Žukauskas, Andrius Jurkūnas, Mindaugas Žukauskas (Coach: Vladas Garastas)

1997 EuroBasket: finished 6th among 16 teams

Gintaras Einikis, Virginijus Praškevičius, Dainius Adomaitis, Artūras Karnišovas, Saulius Štombergas, Darius Maskoliūnas, Kęstutis Šeštokas, Andrius Jurkūnas, Darius Lukminas, Šarūnas Jasikevičius, Mindaugas Timinskas, Eurelijus Žukauskas (Coach: Jonas Kazlauskas)

1998 World Championship: finished 7th among 16 teams

Artūras Karnišovas, Saulius Štombergas, Gintaras Einikis, Virginijus Praškevičius, Tomas Masiulis, Mindaugas Žukauskas, Dainius Adomaitis, Darius Maskoliūnas, Darius Lukminas, Šarūnas Jasikevičius, Eurelijus Žukauskas, Tomas Pačėsas (Coach: Jonas Kazlauskas)

1999 EuroBasket: finished 5th among 16 teams

Arvydas Sabonis, Artūras Karnišovas, Saulius Štombergas, Šarūnas Jasikevičius, Gintaras Einikis, Eurelijus Žukauskas, Virginijus Praškevičius, Mindaugas Žukauskas, Tomas Masiulis, Dainius Adomaitis, Darius Maskoliūnas, Kęstutis Marčiulionis (Coach: Jonas Kazlauskas)

2000 Olympic Games: finished (bronze) among 12 teams

Šarūnas Jasikevičius, Saulius Štombergas, Mindaugas Timinskas, Gintaras Einikis, Ramūnas Šiškauskas, Darius Songaila, Eurelijus Žukauskas, Tomas Masiulis, Dainius Adomaitis, Darius Maskoliūnas, Andrius Giedraitis, Kestutis Marciulionis (Coach: Jonas Kazlauskas)

2001 EuroBasket: finished 12th among 16 teams

Šarūnas Jasikevičius, Saulius Štombergas, Ramūnas Šiškauskas, Darius Songaila, Gintaras Einikis, Mindaugas Žukauskas, Mindaugas Timinskas, Eurelijus Žukauskas, Rimantas Kaukėnas, Robertas Javtokas, Donatas Slanina, Andrius Jurkūnas (Coach: Jonas Kazlauskas)

2003 EuroBasket: finished (gold) among 16 teams

Šarūnas Jasikevičius, Arvydas Macijauskas, Ramūnas Šiškauskas, Saulius Štombergas, Darius Songaila, Eurelijus Žukauskas, Mindaugas Žukauskas, Donatas Slanina, Kšyštof Lavrinovič, Virginijus Praškevičius, Dainius Šalenga, Giedrius Gustas (Coach: Antanas Sireika)

2004 Olympic Games: finished 4th among 12 teams

Šarūnas Jasikevičius, Arvydas Macijauskas, Saulius Štombergas, Ramūnas Šiškauskas, Darius Songaila, Eurelijus Žukauskas, Kšyštof Lavrinovič, Dainius Šalenga, Robertas Javtokas, Mindaugas Žukauskas, Donatas Slanina, Vidas Ginevičius (Coach: Antanas Sireika)

2005 EuroBasket: finished 5th among 16 teams

Ramūnas Šiškauskas, Robertas Javtokas, Mindaugas Žukauskas, Simas Jasaitis, Kšyštof Lavrinovič, Darjuš Lavrinovič, Vidas Ginevicius, Paulius Jankūnas, Simonas Serapinas, Giedrius Gustas, Darius Šilinskis, Mindaugas Lukauskis (Coach: Antanas Sireika)

2006 World Championship: finished 7th among 24 teams

Arvydas Macijauskas, Darius Songaila, Robertas Javtokas, Simas Jasaitis, Mindaugas Žukauskas, Darjuš Lavrinovič, Kšyštof Lavrinovič, Linas Kleiza, Paulius Jankūnas, Giedrius Gustas, Tomas Delininkaitis, Mantas Kalnietis (Coach: Antanas Sireika)

2007 EuroBasket: finished (bronze) among 16 teams

Šarūnas Jasikevičius, Ramūnas Šiškauskas, Rimantas Kaukėnas, Simas Jasaitis, Darius Songaila, Kšyštof Lavrinovič, Darjuš Lavrinovič, Linas Kleiza, Robertas Javtokas, Jonas Mačiulis, Paulius Jankūnas, Giedrius Gustas (Coach: Ramūnas Butautas)

2008 Olympic Games: finished 4th among 12 teams

Šarūnas Jasikevičius, Ramūnas Šiškauskas, Rimantas Kaukėnas, Simas Jasaitis, Kšyštof Lavrinovič, Darjuš Lavrinovič, Linas Kleiza, Robertas Javtokas, Jonas Mačiulis, Mindaugas Lukauskis, Marius Prekevičius, Marijonas Petravičius (Coach: Ramūnas Butautas)

2009 EuroBasket: finished 11th among 16 teams

Marijonas Petravičius, Linas Kleiza, Simas Jasaitis, Robertas Javtokas, Tomas Delininkaitis, Artūras Jomantas, Kšyštof Lavrinovič, Darjuš Lavrinovič, Mantas Kalnietis, Jonas Mačiulis, Mindaugas Lukauskis, Andrius Mažutis (Coach: Ramūnas Butautas)

2010 World Championship: finished (bronze) among 24 teams

Linas Kleiza, Mantas Kalnietis, Martynas Pocius, Jonas Mačiulis, Simas Jasaitis, Tomas Delininkaitis, Paulius Jankūnas, Martynas Gecevičius, Tadas Klimavičius, Robertas Javtokas, Martynas Andriuškevičius, Renaldas Seibutis (Coach: Kęstutis Kemzūra)

2011 EuroBasket: finished 5th among 24 teams

Šarūnas Jasikevičius, Rimantas Kaukėnas, Darius Songaila, Mantas Kalnietis, Martynas Pocius, Simas Jasaitis, Tomas Delininkaitis, Paulius Jankūnas, Robertas Javtokas, Marijonas Petravičius, Kšyštof Lavrinovič, Jonas Valančiūnas (Coach: Kęstutis Kemzūra)

2012 FIBA World Olympic Qualifying Tournament: qualified with 2 other teams among 12 teams

Šarūnas Jasikevičius, Mantas Kalnietis, Rimantas Kaukėnas, Tomas Delininkaitis, Deividas Dulkys, Jonas Mačiulis, Martynas Pocius, Linas Kleiza, Paulius Jankūnas, Darius Songaila, Robertas Javtokas, Jonas Valančiūnas (Coach: Kęstutis Kemzūra)

2012 Olympic Games: finished 8th among 12 teams

Šarūnas Jasikevičius, Linas Kleiza, Rimantas Kaukėnas, Jonas Mačiulis, Mantas Kalnietis, Martynas Pocius, Simas Jasaitis, Paulius Jankūnas, Renaldas Seibutis, Darius Songaila, Antanas Kavaliauskas, Jonas Valančiūnas (Coach: Kęstutis Kemzūra)

2013 EuroBasket: finished (silver) among 24 teams

Donatas Motiejūnas, Jonas Valančiūnas, Linas Kleiza, Mantas Kalnietis, Mindaugas Kuzminskas, Darjuš Lavrinovič, Kšyštof Lavrinovič, Jonas Mačiulis, Tomas Delininkaitis, Renaldas Seibutis, Martynas Pocius, Robertas Javtokas (Coach: Jonas Kazlauskas)

2014 FIBA World Cup: finished 4th among 24 teams

Jonas Valančiūnas, Darjuš Lavrinovič, Donatas Motiejūnas, Kšyštof Lavrinovič, Paulius Jankūnas, Jonas Mačiulis, Simas Jasaitis, Mindaugas Kuzminskas, Martynas Pocius, Renaldas Seibutis, Adas Juškevičius, Šarūnas Vasiliauskas (Coach: Jonas Kazlauskas)

2015 EuroBasket: finished (silver) among 24 teams

Mantas Kalnietis, Deividas Gailius, Jonas Mačiulis, Renaldas Seibutis, Domantas Sabonis, Antanas Kavaliauskas, Paulius Jankūnas, Jonas Valančiūnas, Robertas Javtokas, Mindaugas Kuzminskas, Artūras Milaknis, Lukas Lekavičius (Coach: Jonas Kazlauskas)

2016 Summer Olympics: finished 7th among 12 teams

Mantas Kalnietis, Jonas Valančiūnas, Domantas Sabonis, Marius Grigonis, Jonas Mačiulis, Mindaugas Kuzminskas, Antanas Kavaliauskas, Robertas Javtokas, Paulius Jankūnas, Renaldas Seibutis, Adas Juškevičius, Vaidas Kariniauskas (Coach: Jonas Kazlauskas)

2017 EuroBasket: finished 9th among 24 teams

Mantas Kalnietis, Adas Juškevičius, Jonas Mačiulis, Martynas Gecevičius, Jonas Valančiūnas, Mindaugas Kuzminskas, Donatas Motiejūnas, Artūras Milaknis, Eimantas Bendžius, Marius Grigonis, Artūras Gudaitis, Edgaras Ulanovas (Coach: Dainius Adomaitis)

2019 FIBA World Cup: finished 9th among 32 teams

Mantas Kalnietis, Jonas Mačiulis, Renaldas Seibutis, Domantas Sabonis, Paulius Jankūnas, Jonas Valančiūnas, Mindaugas Kuzminskas, Rokas Giedraitis, Marius Grigonis, Lukas Lekavičius, Arnas Butkevičius, Edgaras Ulanovas (Coach: Dainius Adomaitis)

2022 EuroBasket: finished 15th among 24 teams

Eigirdas Žukauskas, Ignas Brazdeikis, Domantas Sabonis, Rokas Jokubaitis, Martynas Echodas, Jonas Valančiūnas, Mindaugas Kuzminskas, Kristupas Žemaitis, Rokas Giedraitis, Marius Grigonis, Lukas Lekavičius, Arnas Butkevičius (Coach: Kazys Maksvytis)

2023 FIBA World Cup: finished 6th among 32 teams

Margiris Normantas, Tadas Sedekerskis, Ignas Brazdeikis, Gabrielius Maldūnas, Rokas Jokubaitis, Jonas Valančiūnas, Mindaugas Kuzminskas, Donatas Motiejūnas, Eimantas Bendžius, Vaidas Kariniauskas, Tomas Dimša, Deividas Sirvydis (Coach: Kazys Maksvytis)

2025 EuroBasket: finished 5th among 24 teams

Marek Blaževič, Margiris Normantas, Arnas Velička, Gytis Radzevičius, Tadas Sedekerskis, Ąžuolas Tubelis, Rokas Jokubaitis, Laurynas Birutis, Jonas Valančiūnas, Rokas Giedraitis, Ignas Sargiūnas, Deividas Sirvydis (Coach: Rimas Kurtinaitis)

=== Statistics ===
==== Games ====
Rank	Name	NT career	Games
1	Gintaras Einikis	1992–2002	106
2	Šarūnas Jasikevičius	1997–2012	104
3	Saulius Štombergas	1993–2004	99
4	Mantas Kalnietis	2006–2021	95
5	Jonas Valančiūnas	2011–	94
5	Jonas Mačiulis	2007–2021	94
7	Robertas Javtokas	2001–2016	91
8	Eurelijus Žukauskas	1996–2004	86
9	Mindaugas Kuzminskas	2013–2025	83
10	Artūras Karnišovas	1992–1999	80
11	Kšyštof Lavrinovič	2003–2018	79
12	Paulius Jankūnas	2005–2019	73
13	Mindaugas Žukauskas	1996–2006	71
14	Darius Songaila	2000–2012	68
14	Simas Jasaitis	2005–2014	68
16	Renaldas Seibutis	2010–2019	64
17	Linas Kleiza	2006–2013	62
18	Ramūnas Šiškauskas	1999–2008	60
19	Darius Maskoliūnas	1995–2003	55
20	Darjuš Lavrinovič	2005–2014	53

Last updated: 2025-09-11 Statistics include official FIBA-recognized matches only.

==== Points ====
Rank	Name	NT career	Total points
1	Artūras Karnišovas	1992–1999	1466
2	Saulius Štombergas	1993–2004	1084
3	Šarūnas Jasikevičius	1997–2012	1031
4	Gintaras Einikis	1992–2002	1024
5	Jonas Valančiūnas	2011–	1009
6	Arvydas Sabonis	1992–1999	995
7	Mantas Kalnietis	2006–2021	950
8	Linas Kleiza	2006–2013	785
9	Ramūnas Šiškauskas	1999–2008	772
10	Jonas Mačiulis	2007–2021	697
11	Mindaugas Kuzminskas	2013–2025	687
12	Šarūnas Marčiulionis	1992–1996	685
13	Darius Songaila	2000–2012	630
14	Rimas Kurtinaitis	1992–1997	604
15	Kšyštof Lavrinovič	2003–2018	528
16	Arvydas Macijauskas	2002–2006	497
17	Eurelijus Žukauskas	1996–2004	490
18	Robertas Javtokas	2001–2016	470
19	Paulius Jankūnas	2005–2019	450
20	Renaldas Seibutis	2010–2019	446

Last updated: 2025-09-11. Statistics include official FIBA-recognized matches only.

==== 2 points field-goals made ====
Rank	Name	2 points field-goals made
1	Gintaras Einikis	427
2	Jonas Valančiūnas	379
3	Arvydas Sabonis	327
4	Saulius Štombergas	297
5	Artūras Karnišovas	291

==== 3 points field-goals made ====
Rank	Name	3 points field-goals made
1	Šarūnas Jasikevičius	152
2	Saulius Štombergas	130
3	Artūras Karnišovas	113
4	Mantas Kalnietis	105
5	Rimas Kurtinaitis	99

==== Free-throws made ====
Rank	Name	Free-throws made
1	Artūras Karnišovas	389
2	Arvydas Sabonis	236
3	Jonas Valančiūnas	233
4	Saulius Štombergas	216
5	Ramūnas Šiškauskas	202

==== Total rebounds ====
Rank	Name	Total rebounds
1	Jonas Valančiūnas	644
2	Arvydas Sabonis	548
3	Gintaras Einikis	507
4	Eurelijus Žukauskas	400
5	Artūras Karnišovas	390

==== Assists ====
Rank	Name	Assists
1	Mantas Kalnietis	484
2	Šarūnas Jasikevičius	483
3	Šarūnas Marčiulionis	196
4	Artūras Karnišovas	183
5	Ramūnas Šiškauskas	156

==== Steals ====
Rank	Name	Steals
1	Saulius Štombergas	122
2	Gintaras Einikis	116
3	Šarūnas Jasikevičius	101
4	Artūras Karnišovas	100
5	Jonas Mačiulis	95

==== Blocks ====
Rank	Name	Blocks
1	Jonas Valančiūnas	96
2	Eurelijus Žukauskas	58
3	Robertas Javtokas	52
4	Darjuš Lavrinovič	35
5	Arvydas Sabonis	30

Last updated: 2024-02-26. Statistics include official FIBA-recognized matches only.

==== All time points per game (PPG) ====
Only players with significant number of games played or points scored.^{‡}

Rank	Name	NT career	Games played	Total points	PPG	Most points	Opponent	Result	Date	Tournament	Venue
1	Šarūnas Marčiulionis	1992–1996	34	685	20.14	38	Germany	100:84	1992-07-01	Olympic Qualification	Zaragoza, Spain
2	Arvydas Sabonis	1992–1999	50	995	19.90	33	CIS Croatia Italy Russia	116:79 99:89 100:87 82:71	1992-06-26 1992-06-29 1992-07-05 1995-06-30	Olympic Qualification Olympic Qualification Olympic Qualification EuroBasket 1995	Badajoz, Spain Zaragoza, Spain Zaragoza, Spain Athens, Greece
3	Artūras Karnišovas	1992–1999	80	1466	18.33	43	Austria	116:94	1993-06-27	EuroBasket Qualification 1995	Vienna, Austria
4	Arvydas Macijauskas	2002–2006	33	497	15.06	32	China	95:75	2004-08-26	Olympic Games 2004	Athens, Greece
5	Rimas Kurtinaitis	1992–1997	45	604	13.42	31	China	112:75	1992-07-26	Olympic Games 1992	Barcelona, Spain
6	Ramūnas Šiškauskas	1999–2008	60	772	12.86	30	Russia	74:86	2007-09-15	EuroBasket 2007	Madrid, Spain
7	Linas Kleiza	2006–2013	62	785	12.66	33	Serbia	99:88	2010-09-12	World Championship 2010	Istanbul, Turkey
8	Jonas Valančiūnas	2011–	87	1009	11.60	34	Germany	107:109	2022-09-04	EuroBasket 2022	Cologne, Germany
9	Saulius Štombergas	1993–2004	99	1084	10.95	28	Australia Germany	93:71 99:89	2000-10-01 2003-09-07	Olympic Games 2000 EuroBasket 2003	Sydney, Australia Norrköping, Sweden
10	Mantas Kalnietis	2006–2021	95	950	10.00	26	Croatia	81:90	2016-08-15	Olympic Games 2016	Rio de Janeiro, Brazil
11	Valdemaras Chomičius	1992–1995	37	369	9.97	30	Netherlands	93:85	1993-06-22	EuroBasket Qualification 1995	Vienna, Austria
12	Šarūnas Jasikevičius	1997–2012	104	1031	9.91	28	United States	94:90	2004-08-21	Olympic Games 2004	Athens, Greece
13	Gintaras Einikis	1992–2002	106	1024	9.66	27	Poland France	108:96 94:88	1995-10-11 1997-06-26	EuroBasket Qualification 1997 EuroBasket 1997	Vilnius, Lithuania Girona, Spain
14	Eimantas Bendžius	2017–	34	321	9.44	26	Czech Republic	97:89	2020-02-24	Eurobasket 2022 Qualification	Vilnius, Lithuania
15	Rimantas Kaukėnas	2001–2012	47	443	9.43	22	Italy	79:74	2007-09-08	EuroBasket 2007	Madrid, Spain
16	Darius Songaila	2000–2012	68	630	9.26	20	Croatia	74:72	2007-09-14	EuroBasket 2007	Madrid, Spain
17	Marius Grigonis	2016–	34	292	8.59	19	Australia	82:87	2019-09-05	World Cup 2019	Dongguan, China
18	Mindaugas Kuzminskas	2013–	76	631	8.30	23	Argentina	81:73	2016-08-11	Olympic Games 2016	Rio de Janeiro, Brazil
19	Darius Lukminas	1994–1999	50	407	8.14	25	Belgium Sweden	83:85 108:87	1995-11-15 1996-12-18	EuroBasket Qualification 1997 EuroBasket Qualification 1997	Aalst, Belgium Vilnius, Lithuania
20	Darjuš Lavrinovič	2005–2014	53	422	7.96	18	Germany	77:62	2006-09-03	World Championship 2006	Saitama, Japan

Last updated: 2024-02-26. Statistics include official FIBA-recognized matches only.

==== Players records ====
Statistic	Record	Player	Opponent	Result	Date	Tournament	Venue
Points	43	Artūras Karnišovas	Austria	116:94	27 June 1993	EuroBasket Qualification 1995	Vienna, Austria
Minutes	48(2OT)	Arvydas Sabonis	Croatia	83:81	20 July 1996	Olympic Games 1996	Atlanta, USA
2-Pt made	14	Linas Kleiza	China	78:67	7 September 2010	World Cup 2010	Istanbul, Turkey
3-Pt made	7	Šarūnas Jasikevičius Arvydas Macijauskas	United States United States	94:90 96:104	21 August 2004 28 August 2004	Olympic Games 2004 Olympic Games 2004	Athens, Greece Athens, Greece
FT made	17	Šarūnas Marčiulionis	Germany	100:84	1 July 1992	Olympic Qualification 1992	Zaragoza, Spain
2-Pt %	100 (8/8)	Artūras Karnišovas Jonas Valančiūnas	Switzerland Mexico	118:62 87:74	26 February 1997 30 August 2014	EuroBasket Qualification 1997 World Cup 2014	Neuchâtel, Switzerland Gran Canaria, Spain
3-Pt %	100 (6/6)	Eimantas Bendžius	Kosovo	106:50	26 February 2018	World Cup Qualification 2019	Klaipėda, Lithuania
FT %	100 (12/12)	Artūras Karnišovas	Poland Estonia	108:96 87:77	11 October 1995 3 December 1997	EuroBasket Qualification 1997 EuroBasket Qualification 1999	Vilnius, Lithuania Vilnius, Lithuania
Total rebounds	23	Arvydas Sabonis	Greece	89:73	22 June 1995	EuroBasket 1995	Athens, Greece
Assists	13	Mantas Kalnietis	Belgium	74:76	7 September 2015	EuroBasket 2015	Riga, Latvia
Steals	8	Rimas Kurtinaitis	Venezuela	87:79	27 July 1992	Olympic Games 1992	Barcelona, Spain
Blocks	5	Arvydas Sabonis Eurelijus Žukauskas Jonas Valančiūnas	China Turkey Croatia	112:75 102:99 77:62	26 July 1992 25 January 2003 20 September 2013	Olympic Games 1992 EuroBasket Qualification 2003 EuroBasket 2013	Barcelona, Spain Istanbul, Turkey Ljubljana, Slovenia

Last updated: 2019-02-25. Statistics include official FIBA-recognized matches only.

==== Youngest players ====
Rank	Name	First game	Age
1	Zenonas Puzinauskas	1937–05-02	17y59d
2	Vytautas Lesčinskas	1939–05-23	17y^{‡}
3	Vytautas Norkus	1939–05-25	18y117d
4	Žydrūnas Ilgauskas	1993-11-17	18y165d
5	Leonas Petrauskas	1937-05-05	18y^{‡}
6	Artūras Andrulis	1937–05-03	19y23d
7	Marek Blaževič	2020-11-27	19y88d
8	Rokas Jokubaitis	2020-02-24	19y97d
9	Jonas Valančiūnas	2011–08-31	19y117d
10	Domantas Sabonis	2015–09-05	19y125d
11	Kęstutis Šeštokas	1995-10-08	19y175d
12	Saulius Štombergas	1993-06-24	19y193d
13	Pranas Mažeika	1937-05-04	19y302d
14	Alvydas Pazdrazdis	1992–06-23	19y336d
15	Mantas Kalnietis	2006-08-19	19y348d
16	Arnoldas Kulboka	2018-02-26	20y53d
17	Laurynas Birutis	2018-02-26	20y183d
18	Martynas Echodas	2018-02-23	20y231d
19	Saulius Kuzminskas	2003-01-25	20y235d
20	Gytis Masiulis	2018-12-02	20y236d

Last updated: 2024-02-26. Statistics include official FIBA-recognized matches only.

==== Oldest players ====
Rank	Name	Last game	Age
1	Kšyštof Lavrinovič	2018-02-23	38y114d
2	Sergejus Jovaiša	1992-08-08	37y234d
3	Rimas Kurtinaitis	1997-01-29	36y259d
4	Šarūnas Jasikevičius	2012-08-08	36y158d
5	Robertas Javtokas	2016–08-13	36y146d
6	Valdemaras Chomičius	1995-07-02	36y59d
7	Jonas Mačiulis	2021-02-22	36y12d
8	Paulius Jankūnas	2019-09-09	35y133d
9	Rimantas Kaukėnas	2012-08-08	35y119d
10	Darjuš Lavrinovič	2014-09-13	34y304d
11	Mantas Kalnietis	2021–07-04	34y301d
12	Arvydas Sabonis	1999-07-03	34y196d
13	Darius Songaila	2012-08-08	34y188d
14	Gintaras Krapikas	1995-11-12	34y134d
15	Renaldas Seibutis	2019-09-09	34y48d
16	Mindaugas Kuzminskas	2023-09-09	33y325d
17	Deividas Gailius	2022–02-27	33y308d
18	Mindaugas Girdžiūnas	2022-11-14	33y298d
19	Eimantas Bendžius	2023–09-03	33y133d
20	Gintaras Einikis	2002–11-27	33y59d

Last updated: 2024-02-26. Statistics include official FIBA-recognized matches only.

==== Team records ====
Statistic	Record	Opponent	Result	Date	Tournament	Venue
Biggest victory	103	Finland	112:9	27 May 1939	EuroBasket 1939	Kaunas, Lithuania
Biggest victory (modern era)	61	China	116:55	28 July 1996	Olympic Games 1996	Atlanta, USA
Biggest defeat	51	United States	76:127	6 August 1992	Olympic Games 1992	Barcelona, Spain
Most points scored	118	Switzerland	118:62	26 February 1997	EuroBasket Qualification 1997	Neuchâtel, Switzerland
Lowest total points	20	Estonia	20:15	4 May 1937	EuroBasket 1937	Riga, Latvia
Lowest total points (modern era)	47	France	47:63	22 September 2005	EuroBasket 2005	Belgrade, Serbia & Montenegro
Most offensive points	127	United States	76:127	6 August 1992	Olympic Games 1992	Barcelona, Spain
Lowest points allowed	7	Egypt	21:7	5 May 1937	EuroBasket 1937	Riga, Latvia
Lowest points allowed (modern era)	47	Switzerland Senegal	93:47 101:47	28 November 2001 1 September 2019	EuroBasket Qualification 2003 2019 FIBA Basketball World Cup	Vilnius, Lithuania Dongguan, China
Total rebounds	54	Korea	97:56	29 July 1998	World Championship 1998	Athens, Greece
Assists	32	Russia	103:72	3 July 1999	EuroBasket 1999	Paris, France
Steals	23	Puerto Rico	104:91	29 July 1992	Olympic Games 1992	Barcelona, Spain
Blocks	8	Bulgaria Israel	117:72 94:62	23 November 2002 6 September 2003	EuroBasket Qualification 2003 EuroBasket 2003	Vilnius, Lithuania Norrköping, Sweden
Free throws made	42	Brazil	114:96	4 August 1992	Olympic Games 1992	Barcelona, Spain
Free throw %	100(22/22)	Netherlands	78:69	22 February 2019	World Cup Qualification 2019	Amsterdam, Netherlands
2-pointers made	40	Latvia	108:65	17 November 1993	EuroBasket Qualification 1995	Kaunas, Lithuania
2-point %	80(36/45)	Switzerland	118:62	26 February 1997	EuroBasket Qualification 1997	Neuchâtel, Switzerland
3-pointers made	21	United States	96:104	28 August 2004	Olympic Games 2004	Athens, Greece
3-point %	80(8/10)	China	112:75	26 July 1992	Olympic Games 1992	Barcelona, Spain

Last updated: 2024-02-26. Statistics include official FIBA-recognized matches only.

== FIBA World Rankings ==
Lithuania's consistent status as one of the major powers in international basketball made them rank highly at the FIBA World Rankings.

Year	Place	Points	Change
2006	5th	460	N/A
2007	5th	486	Steady
2008	6th	411	▼1
2009	6th	374	Steady
2010	5th	532	▲1
2011	5th	426	Steady
2012	5th	406	Steady
2013	4th	432	▲1
2014	4th	447	Steady
2015	3rd	457	▲1
2016	5th	442	▼2
2017	5th	453	Steady
2018	6th	621	▼1
2019	8th	643.9	▼2
2020	8th	635.2	Steady
2021	8th	634.6	Steady
2022	8th	669.5	Steady
2023	10th	713.1	▼2
2024	10th	698.9	Steady

== All-time team record ==
The following table shows Lithuania's all-time official FIBA international record, correct as of 3 September 2025.

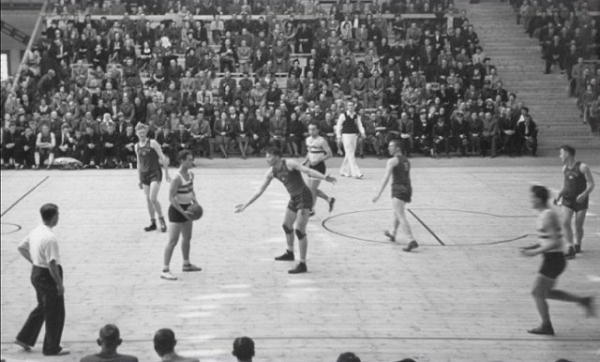
Lithuania-Hungary in 1939

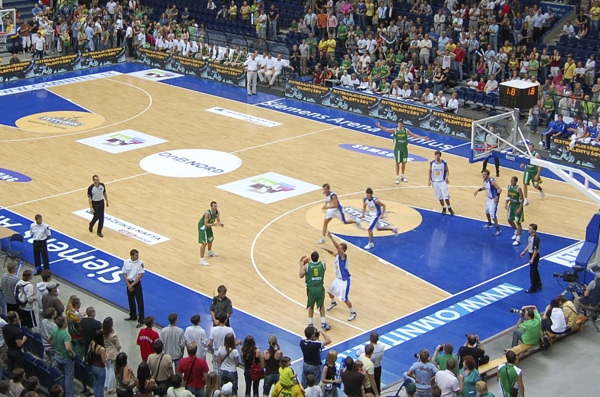
Lithuania-Iceland in 2008

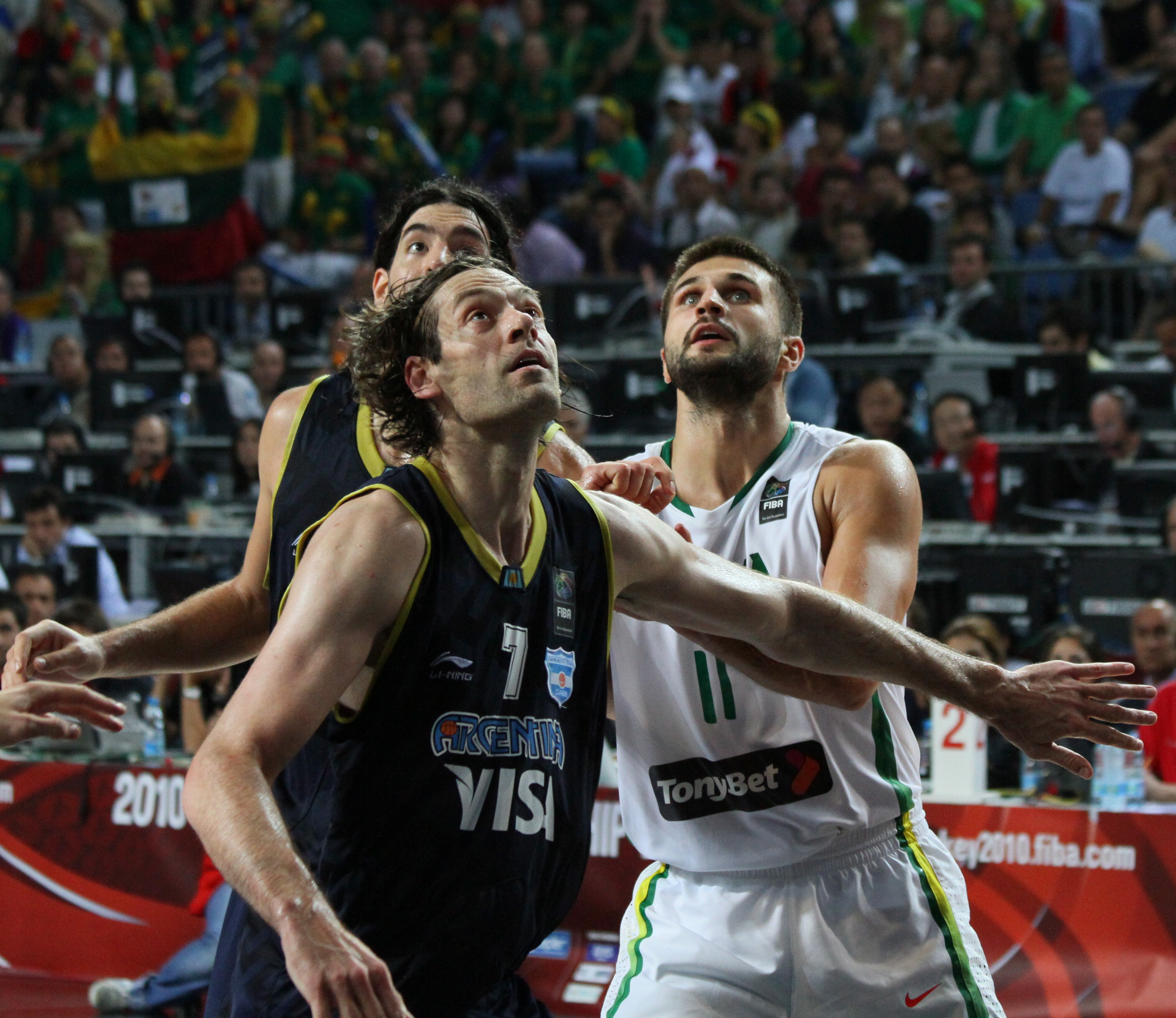
Lithuania-Argentina in 2010

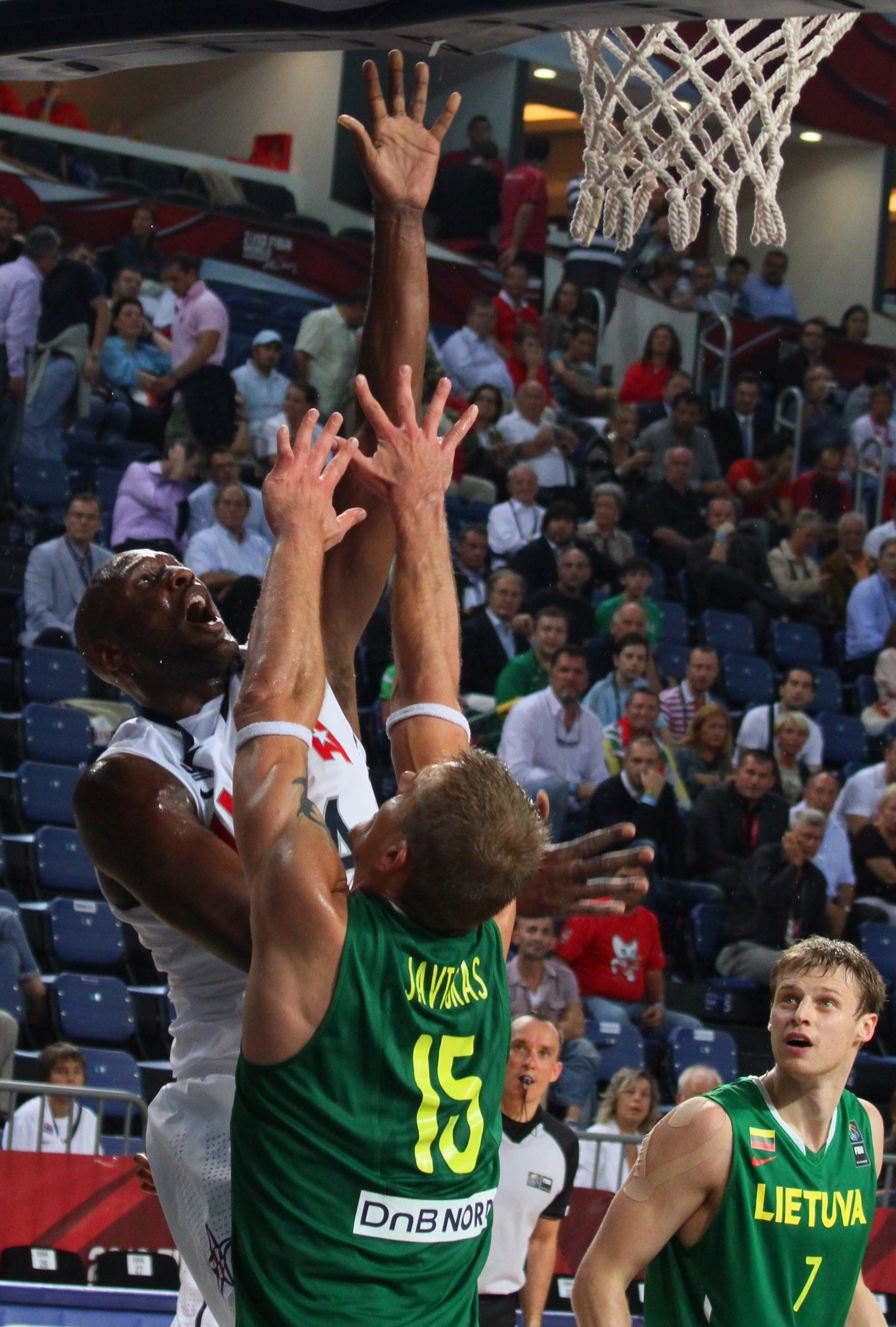
Lithuania-United States in 2010

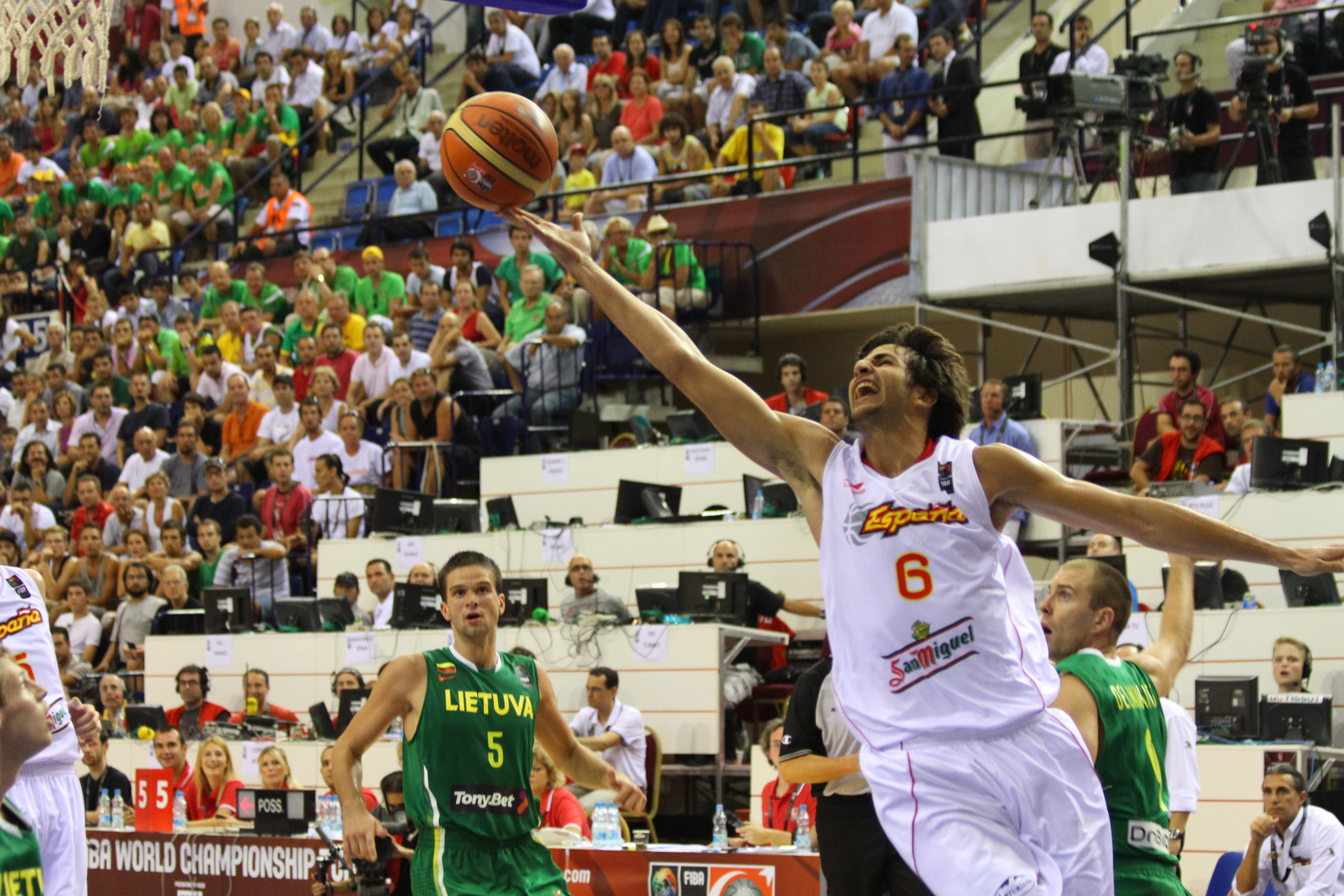
Lithuania-Spain in 2010

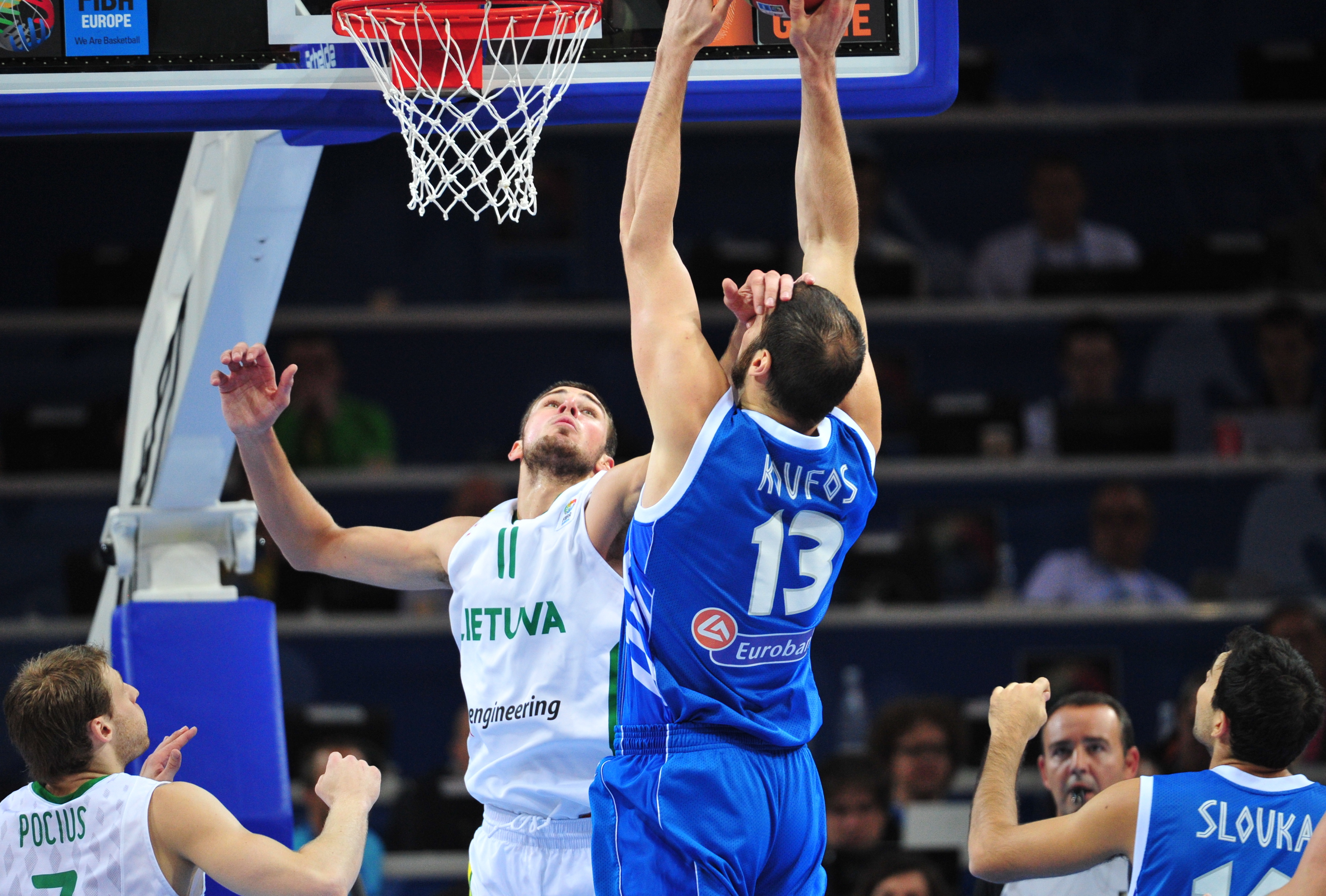
Lithuania-Greece in 2011

Lithuania-Brazil in 2016

Opponents	Played	Won	Lost	% Won	Biggest victory	Biggest defeat
Angola	4	4	0	100%	+36 (85:49)	–
Argentina	9	6	3	67%	+19 (104:85)	−23 (79:102)
Australia	10	5	5	50%	+21 (78:57)	−31 (75:106)
Austria	1	1	0	100%	+22 (116:94)	–
Belarus	1	0	1	0%	–	−8 (80–88)
Belgium	6	3	3	50%	+23 (75:52)	−21 (65:86)
Bosnia and Herzegovina	6	4	2	67%	+30 (87:57)	−6 (72:78)
Brazil	4	4	0	100%	+18 (114:96)	–
Bulgaria	6	6	0	100%	+45 (117:72)	–
CIS	3	2	1	67%	+37 (116:79)	−12 (80:92)
Canada	2	2	0	100%	+23 (92:69)	–
China	6	6	0	100%	+61 (116:55)	–
Croatia	13	11	2	85%	+18 (85:67)	−9 (81:90)
Czech Republic^{[a]}	8	6	2	75%	+20 (95:75)	−16 (62:78)
Denmark	2	1	1	50%	+1 (77:76)	−4 (76–80)
Dominican Republic	2	2	0	100%	+26 (109:83)	–
Egypt	2	2	0	100%	+26 (93:67)	–
Estonia	10	9	1	90%	+31 (91:60)	−6 (59–65)
Finland	2	2	0	100%	+103 (112:9)	–
France	19	7	12	37%	+30 (48:18)	−25 (65:90)
Great Britain	3	3	0	100%	+24 (94:70)	–
Georgia	2	1	1	50%	+4 (85:81)	−2 (77:79)
Germany	10	8	2	80%	+22 (93:71)	−19 (88:107)
Greece	10	7	3	70%	+33 (99:66)	−13 (64:77)
Hungary	7	7	0	100%	+64 (79:15)	–
Iceland	3	3	0	100%	+46 (94:48)	–
Iran	1	1	0	100%	+32 (99:67)	–
Israel	6	6	0	100%	+32 (94:62)	–
Italy	17	13	4	76%	+24 (88:64)	−9 (91–100)
Ivory Coast	1	1	0	100%	+4 (97:93)	−
South Korea	3	3	0	100%	+41 (97:56)	–
Kosovo	2	2	0	100%	+56 (106:50)	–
Latvia	8	6	2	75%	+43 (108:65)	−35 (63:98)
Lebanon	1	1	0	100%	+18 (84:66)	–
North Macedonia	4	3	1	75%	+22 (94:72)	−2 (65:67)
Mexico	4	4	0	100%	+30 (96:66)	–
Montenegro	5	5	0	100%	+27 (94:67)	–
Netherlands	8	8	0	100%	+31 (88:57)	–
New Zealand	3	3	0	100%	+13 (92:79)	–
Nigeria	3	2	1	67%	+19 (72:53)	−6 (80:86)
Poland	13	11	2	85%	+34 (82:48)	−19 (69:88)
Portugal	1	1	0	100%	+29 (98:69)	–
Puerto Rico	4	3	1	75%	+13 (104:91)	–11 (68:79)
Qatar	1	1	0	100%	+41 (106:65)	–
Russia	8	4	4	50%	+31 (103:72)	−29 (64:93)
Scotland	1	1	0	100%	+48 (117:69)	–
Senegal	1	1	0	100%	+54 (101:47)	–
Serbia^{[b]}	13	5	8	38%	+16 (98:82)	−19 (68:87)
Slovenia	12	8	4	67%	+19 (80:61)	−23 (58:81)
Spain	12	2	10	17%	+9 (93:84)	−50 (59:109)
Sweden	4	4	0	100%	+23 (96:73)	–
Switzerland	4	4	0	100%	+56 (118:62)	–
Czechoslovakia	1	1	0	100%	+7 (80:73)	–
Tunisia	1	1	0	100%	+13 (76:63)	–
Turkey	12	9	3	77%	+38 (100:62)	−11 (84:95)
United States	11	3	8	27%	+6 (110:104)	−51 (76:127)
Ukraine	7	5	2	71%	+32 (94:62)	−7 (82:89)
Venezuela	3	3	0	100%	+18 (100:82)	–
Total	325	236	89	73%		

- ^{a} Includes one game against Czechoslovakia.
- ^{b} Includes games against FR Yugoslavia and Serbia and Montenegro.

== Supporters ==
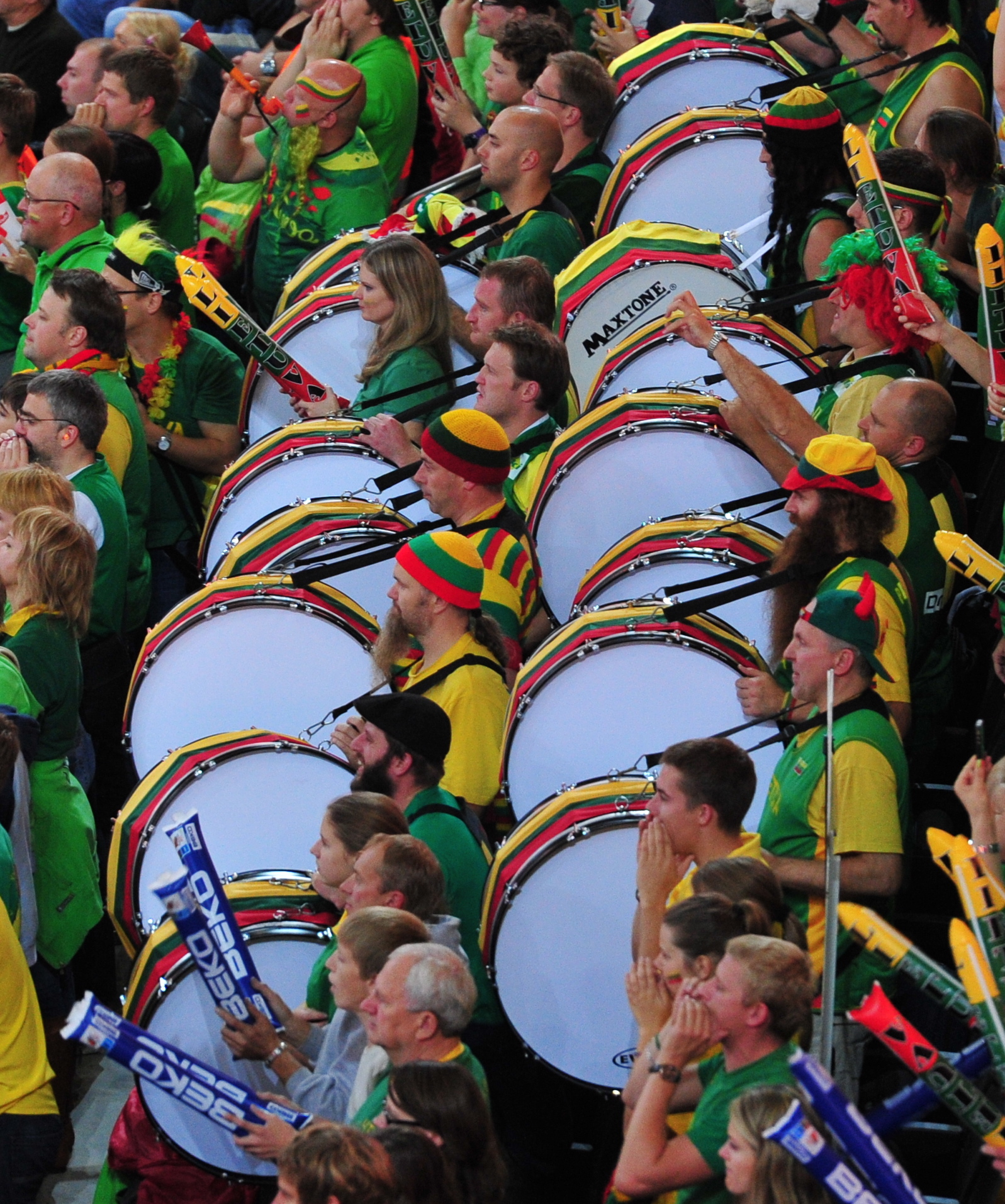
Lithuanian fans with instruments

The popularity of basketball in Lithuania has caused many international writers to compare the sport to a religion in the country. Sports Illustrated reporter Luke Winn added that despite the country's small population of 3.2 million, Lithuania ranked fifth at the 2011 FIBA Men's World Ranking, behind the much larger United States (313 million), Spain (47 million), Argentina (40 million) and Greece (11 million). In 2015, Lithuania was even ranked third at the FIBA Men's World Rankings. The devotion to the team often brings thousands of Lithuanians to travel in their support, no matter what continent. The fans dress and paint themselves in the national colors of yellow, green and red, and spend the games cheering and chanting. Lithuanians frequently display huge flags, usually the national one or the historical Vytis variant. Furthermore, sometimes the modern flag at the center is being embellished with the white color names (often shortened) or the surnames of the most notable national team members, who represents the team at that competition.

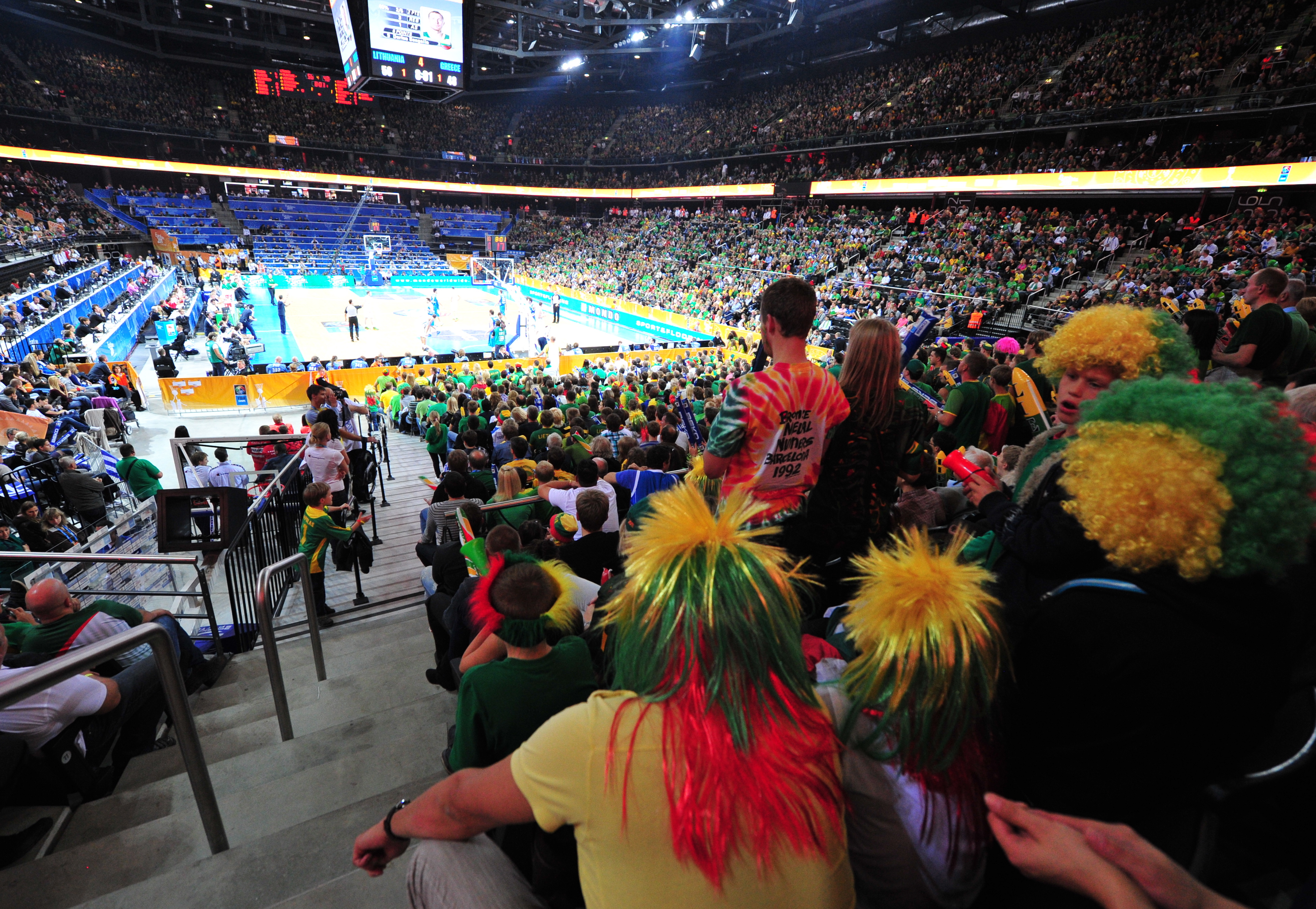
Lithuanian fans in Žalgiris Arena

Lithuanian basketball fans are famous for energetically and unanimously singing the national anthem before all national team games. Most frequently, they loudly shout the last anthem lines, most notably "Vardan tos, Lietuvos. Vienybė težydi!" (English: For the sake of this land. We shall stand together) Other major chants are "LIE-TU-VA" (country's name in Lithuanian) and singing of the popular Lithuanian folk daina "Ant kalno mūrai" (English: Masonries on the hill). When there is no doubt in victory anymore during the end of the game, the Lithuanian fans begins to chant "Mes laimėjom!" (English: We are victorious). One of the most famous fans is Tomas "Sėkla" Balaišis, who has followed the team since 2002 and is known for his distinctive long beard.

Ever since its induction during the coverage of the 2000 Sydney Olympics, "Trys Milijonai" became the unofficial Lithuania national basketball team song. The musical theme was used again during Eurobasket 2001, which made the song a runaway hit and a de facto national basketball anthem. When Lithuania won the European basketball championship in 2003, the song was played right after the final match with Spain. By the 2004 Athens Olympics, the song has become the unofficial Lithuanian Olympic team anthem and by some, is regarded as highly as the unofficial Lithuanian national sports (especially basketball) anthem. Later on, the song was played after almost every match the Lithuania national team played and during its meeting ceremonies after the successful performances.

== Uniforms and kit suppliers ==
The first basketball uniforms worn by Lithuania's national team in the 1930s had two variants: light ones with white T-shirts and dark green shorts, and dark ones with dark green shirts and shorts. Both of these variants had at the front of the shirts "LIETUVA" (the country's name written in the native language) and a red circle with the "Vytis" coat of arms, in the spot where nowadays such jerseys have sponsor logos.

After the team was restored following Lithuania's return as an independent country in 1991, the jerseys used the same color schemes from the 1930s. Only this time, the neck, shoulders and sides had a three lined piping in the national flag's colors. The light variant had Lietuva in red, while the dark one had the country's name in white. It was manufactured by Reebok. This design remained until 1997.

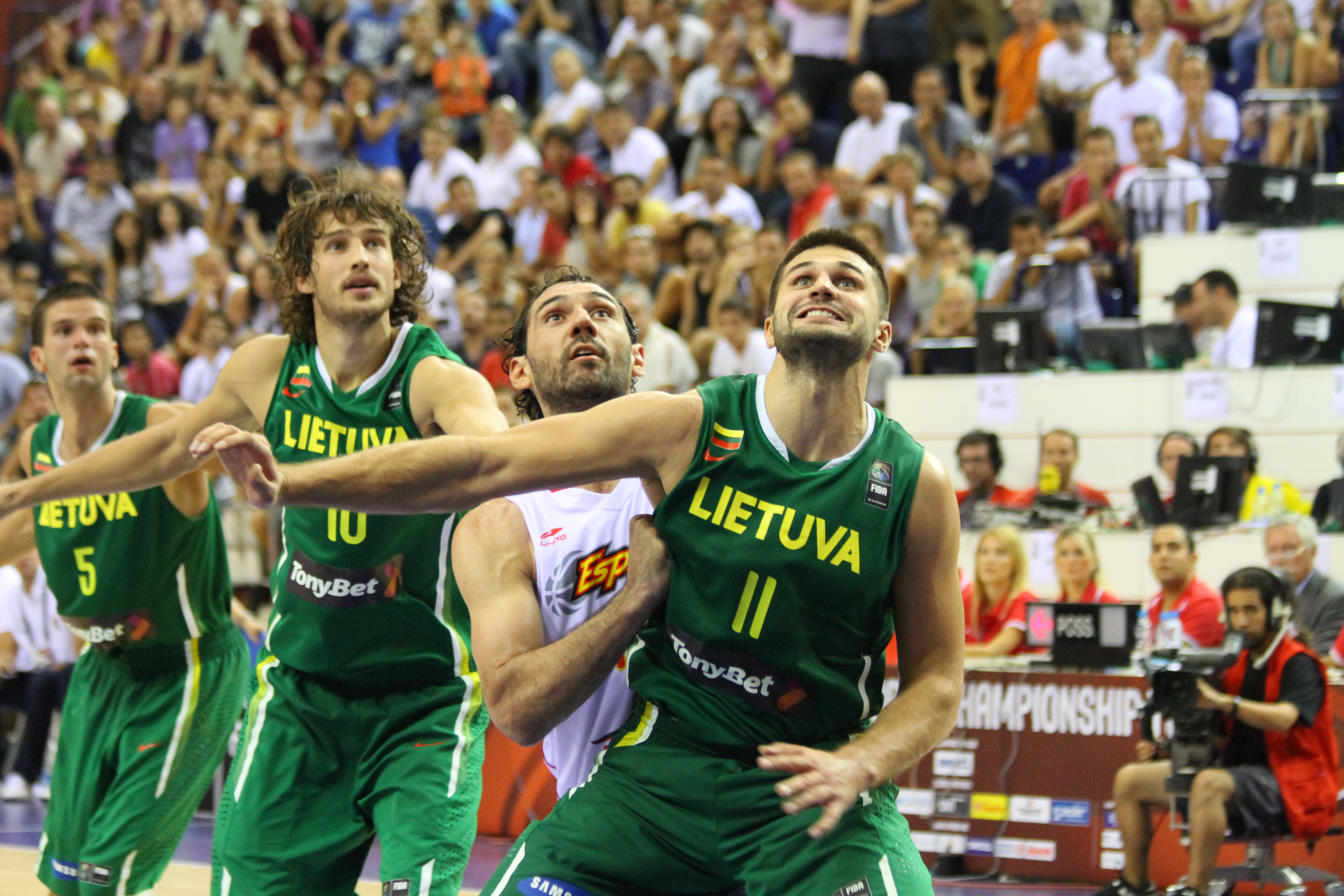
Lithuanians wearing the Nike produced jerseys in 2010

In 1997 Nike replaced Reebok as Lithuania's uniform supplier, a post it retains as of 2015. This led to a new design of the jerseys, with the piping being white in the green jerseys and green in the white ones. The jerseys remained that way until the 2000 Summer Olympics. There another update changed the piping to yellow in the green jerseys, moved the "Lietuva" to the stomach, below a circle with the player's number, and added a small Lithuanian flag on the left shoulder.

Another change was made in 2003, with a simpler design making the player number loose on the left shoulder, "Lietuva" in a smaller font, and no national flag. These probably were the most simplified Lithuanian uniforms ever, but became iconic in the country for being the jerseys of the EuroBasket title.

In 2004, major updates were done, enlarging the country name and returning the flag, while changing the piping to yellow-red in the green jerseys and yellow-green in the white ones. On the dark variant "Lietuva" was in yellow, while on the light variant it was written in green. This color scheme remained until 2010, once red was dropped from the piping. This made the Lithuanian jersey similar to Brazil's, aside from the different shades of green. Red now only appears on the Nike logo and the Lithuanian flag. In 2014, the side piping had its final change, with the addition of yellow-green squares. Since 2010, the back of the jersey has an imprint. The first one was a basketball net on both jerseys, and since 2012 the white jersey had the Vytis symbol.

In 2019, new design of the uniforms was introduced that retained the classical colors, however it reintroduced all three colors of the Lithuania's national flag motifs on the sides. On 10 August 2019, during a game versus Serbia in Žalgiris Arena, Lithuanians wore the interwar design uniforms to pay respect to the EuroBasket 1939 champions.

== General sponsors ==
The general sponsor of Lithuania men's national basketball team is the biggest team's financial supporter, and is given a prominent spot on the jersey, under the text "LIETUVA". The longest-tenured sponsor is the Švyturys brewery, who has designated over 15 million LTL per 15 years for basketball, and was featured in the jersey front from 2005 to 2008. That year, given EuroBasket 2009 was hosted by Poland, Polish Orlen oil refiner and petrol retailer made a deal to become the general sponsor. Following it, Antanas Guoga betting company TonyBet wished to replace it. At first Lithuanian laws only allowed the sponsoring without featuring the logo due to such companies being forbidden to be advertised, but eventually TonyBet's logo was included. Guoga also paid a large share of the required application fee of €500,000 for the 2010 World Championship wild-card. In 2011 TP Engineering company became the Lithuanian team's general sponsor, being replaced again by TonyBet in 2013. In 2014, Vičiūnai Group signed a two-year deal to become the primary sponsor.

General sponsors by competition:

- EuroBasket 1937: None
- EuroBasket 1939: None
- 1992 Summer Olympics: Grateful Dead (logo not printed)
- EuroBasket 1995 – Summer Olympics 2004: None
- EuroBasket 2005: Švyturys
- 2006 World Championship: Švyturys
- EuroBasket 2007: Švyturys
- 2008 Summer Olympics: Švyturys
- EuroBasket 2009: Orlen
- 2010 World Championship: TonyBet
- EuroBasket 2011: TP Engineering
- 2012 Summer Olympics: None
- EuroBasket 2013: TonyBet
- 2014 World Championship: Vičiūnai Group
- EuroBasket 2015: Vičiūnai Group
- EuroBasket 2017: Vičiūnai Group

== Cultural depictions ==
=== Literature ===
There are many books describing the glorious Lithuanian basketball history. Some of them are freely accessible to everyone online at the official publishers websites. The most notable books are such:

- Stanislovas Stonkus, Krepšinio kelias į Lietuvą. The story of how basketball was introduced in Lithuania, including many historic images of the early basketball games and teams. Part of the book is freely accessible online.
- Vidas Mačiulis and Vytautas Gudelis, Halė, kurioje žaidė Lubinas ir Sabonis. Mostly focuses on the inter-war Lithuanian basketball, describing the history of Kaunas Sports Hall and the EuroBasket titles of 1937 and 1939, while also including basketball history after the occupation of 1940.
- Skirmantas Leonas Karalevičius, Krepšinio pilnaties sapnas. The author began clipping news about Lithuanian basketball in 1946, and thus the articles are heavily featured on the book. Another notable document reproduced is an invitation for the United States team to play in Lithuania following the EuroBasket 1939 title, an event cancelled due to World War II.
- Skirmantas Leonas Karalevičius, XX a. Lietuvos krepšinio legenda.
- Algimantas Bertašius and Stanislovas Stonkus, Su Lietuvos vardu per Europą, per pasaulį. The story of Lithuanian basketball from 1925 to 2013. Its fragments are freely accessible online at the official Alma littera website. Complete first version of the book, released in 2009, is freely available to download at the official LKF website. The updated printed version, released in 2013, costs around 35 €.

=== Documentaries ===
There are several documentaries about the national team, the most notable one being The Other Dream Team, released in 2013 and focusing on the 1992 Barcelona Olympic team. Another that saw international release was 2012's Game of the Nation (Mes už... Lietuvą), about Lithuania's experience hosting EuroBasket 2011. In preparation for the 2004 Olympics, Lithuanian National Radio and Television created Lietuvos Krepšinis 1920–2004, a miniseries about the most important events and players in Lithuanian basketball history.

=== Video games ===
Lithuania's national basketball team has been featured thrice in video games depicting international basketball. The first was in 1992, as Sega's Team USA Basketball for the Mega Drive/Genesis featured all teams from that year's Olympic tournament. Years later, Electronic Arts included Lithuania among various FIBA squads featured in NBA Live 09 (2008) and NBA Live 10 (2009).

=== Bibliography ===
- Stonkus, Stanislovas (2007). Krepšinio kelias į Lietuvą. Kaunas: Šviesa. ISBN 978-5430044435.
- Bertašius, Algimantas; Stonkus, Stanislovas (2009). Su Lietuvos vardu per Europą, per pasaulį: Lietuvos krepšinio rinktinių kelias (1925–2008 m.). Kaunas: Arx Baltica. ISBN 978-9955-39-075-6.

== See also ==
- Sport in Lithuania
- Lithuania men's national under-20 basketball team
- Lithuania men's national under-18 and under-19 basketball team
- Lithuania men's national under-16 and under-17 basketball team
