= Medal winners in Lithuania men's national basketball team =

== Medal winners in Lithuania men's national basketball team ==
Full list of the 82 Lithuanian medal winners while playing in both Lithuania men's national basketball team and the Soviet Union national basketball team in Olympic Games, World Cups and EuroBaskets.

	Meaning
OL	Summer Olympics
WC	World Cup / World Championship
EB	EuroBasket / European Championship

Note: updated to Eurobasket 2017

Player	Total	Playing for Soviet Union									
Player	Total	74 WC	73 EB	72 OL	71 EB	70 WC	69 EB	68 OL	67 EB	67 WC	65 EB
Modestas Paulauskas	10	Gold medal	Bronze medal	Gold medal	Gold medal	Bronze medal	Gold medal	Bronze medal	Gold medal	Gold medal	Gold medal

Player	Total	(Lithuania) LTU			Playing for Soviet Union										
Player	Total	96 OL	95 EB	92 OL	89 EB	88 OL	87 EB	86 WC	85 EB	83 EB	82 WC	81 EB	80 OL	79 EB	78 WC
Valdemaras Chomičius	10		Silver medal	Bronze medal	Bronze medal	Gold medal	Silver medal	Silver medal	Gold medal	Bronze medal	Gold medal			Gold medal	
Arvydas Sabonis	9	Bronze medal	Silver medal	Bronze medal	Bronze medal	Gold medal		Silver medal	Gold medal	Bronze medal	Gold medal				
Sergejus Jovaiša	8			Bronze medal			Silver medal		Gold medal	Bronze medal	Gold medal	Gold medal	Bronze medal		Silver medal
Rimas Kurtinaitis	7	Bronze medal	Silver medal	Bronze medal	Bronze medal	Gold medal		Silver medal	Gold medal						
Šarūnas Marčiulionis	6	Bronze medal	Silver medal	Bronze medal	Bronze medal	Gold medal	Silver medal								

Player	Total	Playing for Soviet Union						
Player	Total	57 EB	56 OL	55 EB	53 EB	52 OL	51 EB	47 EB
Kazimieras Petkevičius	5		Silver medal	Bronze medal	Gold medal	Silver medal		Gold medal
Justinas Lagunavičius	4				Gold medal	Silver medal	Gold medal	Gold medal
Stepas Butautas	4				Gold medal	Silver medal	Gold medal	Gold medal
Algirdas Lauritėnas	4	Gold medal	Silver medal	Bronze medal	Gold medal			
Stanislovas Stonkus	4	Gold medal	Silver medal	Bronze medal		Silver medal		

Player	Total	Playing for Lithuania								
Player	Total	15 EB	13 EB	10 WC	07 EB	03 EB	00 OL	96 OL	95 EB	92 OL
Saulius Štombergas	4					Gold medal	Bronze medal	Bronze medal	Silver medal	
Jonas Mačiulis	4	Silver medal	Silver medal	Bronze medal	Bronze medal					
Robertas Javtokas	4	Silver medal	Silver medal	Bronze medal	Bronze medal					
Gintaras Einikis	4						Bronze medal	Bronze medal	Silver medal	Bronze medal
Kšyštof Lavrinovič	3		Silver medal		Bronze medal	Gold medal				
Darius Songaila	3				Bronze medal	Gold medal	Bronze medal			
Ramūnas Šiškauskas	3				Bronze medal	Gold medal	Bronze medal			
Šarūnas Jasikevičius	3				Bronze medal	Gold medal	Bronze medal			
Eurelijus Žukauskas	3					Gold medal	Bronze medal	Bronze medal		
Mantas Kalnietis	3	Silver medal	Silver medal	Bronze medal						
Renaldas Seibutis	3	Silver medal	Silver medal	Bronze medal						
Paulius Jankūnas	3	Silver medal		Bronze medal	Bronze medal					
Linas Kleiza	3		Silver medal	Bronze medal	Bronze medal					
Artūras Karnišovas	3							Bronze medal	Silver medal	Bronze medal

Player	Total	Lithuania									(Soviet Union)	(Lithuania)			
Player	Total	15 EB	13 EB	10 WC	07 EB	03 EB	00 OL	96 OL	95 EB	92 OL	47 EB	39 EB	37 EB		
Artūras Andrulis	2											Gold medal	Gold medal		
Eugenijus Nikolskis	2											Gold medal	Gold medal		
Feliksas Kriaučiūnas	2											Gold medal	Gold medal		
Leonas Baltrūnas	2											Gold medal	Gold medal		
Leonas Petrauskas	2											Gold medal	Gold medal		
Pranas Mažeika	2											Gold medal	Gold medal		
Zenonas Puzinauskas	2											Gold medal	Gold medal		
Pranas Lubinas	2											Gold medal		(United States)	
Giedrius Gustas	2				Bronze medal	Gold medal									
Mindaugas Žukauskas	2					Gold medal		Bronze medal							
Jonas Valančiūnas	2	Silver medal	Silver medal												
Mindaugas Kuzminskas	2	Silver medal	Silver medal												
Martynas Pocius	2		Silver medal	Bronze medal											
Tomas Delininkaitis	2		Silver medal	Bronze medal											
Darjuš Lavrinovič	2		Silver medal		Bronze medal										
Mindaugas Timinskas	2						Bronze medal		Silver medal						
Darius Lukminas	2							Bronze medal	Silver medal						
Arūnas Visockas	2								Silver medal	Bronze medal					
Gintaras Krapikas	2								Silver medal	Bronze medal					
Simas Jasaitis	2			Bronze medal	Bronze medal										
Arvydas Macijauskas	1					Gold medal									
Dainius Šalenga	1					Gold medal									
Donatas Slanina	1					Gold medal									
Virginijus Praškevičius	1					Gold medal									
Vytautas Kulakauskas	1										Gold medal				
Juozas Jurgėla	1											Gold medal			
Mindaugas Šliūpas	1											Gold medal			
Mykolas Ruzgys	1											Gold medal			
Vytautas Budriūnas	1											Gold medal			
Vytautas Lesčinskas	1											Gold medal			
Vytautas Norkus	1											Gold medal			
Česlovas Daukša	1												Gold medal		
Juozas Žukas	1												Gold medal		
Leopoldas Kepalas	1												Gold medal		
Pranas Talzūnas	1												Gold medal		
Stasys Šačkus	1												Gold medal		
Antanas Kavaliauskas	1	Silver medal													
Artūras Milaknis	1	Silver medal													
Deividas Gailius	1	Silver medal													
Domantas Sabonis	1	Silver medal													
Lukas Lekavičius	1	Silver medal													
Donatas Motiejūnas	1		Silver medal												
Gvidonas Markevičius	1								Silver medal						
Martynas Andriuškevičius	1			Bronze medal											
Martynas Gecevičius	1			Bronze medal											
Tadas Klimavičius	1			Bronze medal											
Rimantas Kaukėnas	1				Bronze medal										
Andrius Giedraitis	1						Bronze medal								
Dainius Adomaitis	1						Bronze medal								
Darius Maskoliūnas	1						Bronze medal								
Kęstutis Marčiulionis	1						Bronze medal								
Tomas Masiulis	1						Bronze medal								Bronze medal
Rytis Vaišvila	1							Bronze medal							
Tomas Pačėsas	1							Bronze medal							
Alvydas Pazdrazdis	1									Bronze medal					
Darius Dimavičius	1									Bronze medal					
Romanas Brazdauskis	1									Bronze medal					

Complete medal table since 1937
Player	Total	Lithuania									Part of Soviet Union																												(Lithuania)		
Player	Total	15 EB	13 EB	10 WC	07 EB	03 EB	00 OL	96 OL	95 EB	92 OL	89 EB	88 OL	87 EB	86 WC	85 EB	83 EB	82 WC	81 EB	80 OL	79 EB	78 WC	74 WC	73 EB	72 OL	71 EB	70 WC	69 EB	68 OL	67 EB	67 WC	65 EB	57 EB	56 OL	55 EB	53 EB	52 OL	51 EB	47 EB	39 EB	37 EB	
Modestas Paulauskas	10																					Gold medal	Bronze medal	Gold medal	Gold medal	Bronze medal	Gold medal	Bronze medal	Gold medal	Gold medal	Gold medal										
Valdemaras Chomičius	10								Silver medal	Bronze medal	Bronze medal	Gold medal	Silver medal	Silver medal	Gold medal	Bronze medal	Gold medal			Gold medal																					
Arvydas Sabonis	9							Bronze medal	Silver medal	Bronze medal	Bronze medal	Gold medal		Silver medal	Gold medal	Bronze medal	Gold medal																								
Sergejus Jovaiša	8									Bronze medal			Silver medal		Gold medal	Bronze medal	Gold medal	Gold medal	Bronze medal		Silver medal																				
Rimas Kurtinaitis	7							Bronze medal	Silver medal	Bronze medal	Bronze medal	Gold medal		Silver medal	Gold medal																										
Šarūnas Marčiulionis	6							Bronze medal	Silver medal	Bronze medal	Bronze medal	Gold medal	Silver medal																												
Kazimieras Petkevičius	5																																Silver medal	Bronze medal	Gold medal	Silver medal		Gold medal			
Justinas Lagunavičius	4																																		Gold medal	Silver medal	Gold medal	Gold medal			
Stepas Butautas	4																																		Gold medal	Silver medal	Gold medal	Gold medal			
Algirdas Lauritėnas	4																															Gold medal	Silver medal	Bronze medal	Gold medal						
Stanislovas Stonkus	4																															Gold medal	Silver medal	Bronze medal		Silver medal					
Saulius Štombergas	4					Gold medal	Bronze medal	Bronze medal	Silver medal																																
Jonas Mačiulis	4	Silver medal	Silver medal	Bronze medal	Bronze medal																																				
Robertas Javtokas	4	Silver medal	Silver medal	Bronze medal	Bronze medal																																				
Gintaras Einikis	4						Bronze medal	Bronze medal	Silver medal	Bronze medal																															
Kšyštof Lavrinovič	3		Silver medal		Bronze medal	Gold medal																																			
Darius Songaila	3				Bronze medal	Gold medal	Bronze medal																																		
Ramūnas Šiškauskas	3				Bronze medal	Gold medal	Bronze medal																																		
Šarūnas Jasikevičius	3				Bronze medal	Gold medal	Bronze medal																																		
Eurelijus Žukauskas	3					Gold medal	Bronze medal	Bronze medal																																	
Renaldas Seibutis	3	Silver medal	Silver medal	Bronze medal																																					
Mantas Kalnietis	3	Silver medal	Silver medal	Bronze medal																																					
Paulius Jankūnas	3	Silver medal		Bronze medal	Bronze medal																																				
Linas Kleiza	3		Silver medal	Bronze medal	Bronze medal																																				
Artūras Karnišovas	3							Bronze medal	Silver medal	Bronze medal																															
Artūras Andrulis	2																																						Gold medal	Gold medal	
Leonas Baltrūnas	2																																						Gold medal	Gold medal	
Feliksas Kriaučiūnas	2																																						Gold medal	Gold medal	
Pranas Mažeika	2																																						Gold medal	Gold medal	
Eugenijus Nikolskis	2																																						Gold medal	Gold medal	
Leonas Petrauskas	2																																						Gold medal	Gold medal	
Zenonas Puzinauskas	2																																						Gold medal	Gold medal	
Pranas Lubinas	2																																						Gold medal		Gold medal
Giedrius Gustas	2				Bronze medal	Gold medal																																			
Mindaugas Žukauskas	2					Gold medal		Bronze medal																																	
Mindaugas Kuzminskas	2	Silver medal	Silver medal																																						
Jonas Valančiūnas	2	Silver medal	Silver medal																																						
Martynas Pocius	2		Silver medal	Bronze medal																																					
Tomas Delininkaitis	2		Silver medal	Bronze medal																																					
Darjuš Lavrinovič	2		Silver medal		Bronze medal																																				
Mindaugas Timinskas	2						Bronze medal		Silver medal																																
Darius Lukminas	2							Bronze medal	Silver medal																																
Arūnas Visockas	2								Silver medal	Bronze medal																															
Gintaras Krapikas	2								Silver medal	Bronze medal																															
Simas Jasaitis	2			Bronze medal	Bronze medal																																				
Arvydas Macijauskas	1					Gold medal																																			
Dainius Šalenga	1					Gold medal																																			
Donatas Slanina	1					Gold medal																																			
Virginijus Praškevičius	1					Gold medal																																			
Vytautas Kulakauskas	1																																					Gold medal			
Mindaugas Šliūpas	1																																						Gold medal		
Vytautas Lesčinskas	1																																						Gold medal		
Vytautas Budriūnas	1																																						Gold medal		
Vytautas Norkus	1																																						Gold medal		
Juozas Jurgėla	1																																						Gold medal		
Mykolas Ruzgys	1																																						Gold medal		
Stasys Šačkus	1																																							Gold medal	
Juozas Žukas	1																																							Gold medal	
Česlovas Daukša	1																																							Gold medal	
Pranas Talzūnas	1																																							Gold medal	
Leopoldas Kepalas	1																																							Gold medal	
Deividas Gailius	1	Silver medal																																							
Domantas Sabonis	1	Silver medal																																							
Antanas Kavaliauskas	1	Silver medal																																							
Artūras Milaknis	1	Silver medal																																							
Lukas Lekavičius	1	Silver medal																																							
Donatas Motiejūnas	1		Silver medal																																						
Gvidonas Markevičius	1								Silver medal																																
Martynas Andriuškevičius	1			Bronze medal																																					
Tadas Klimavičius	1			Bronze medal																																					
Martynas Gecevičius	1			Bronze medal																																					
Rimantas Kaukėnas	1				Bronze medal																																				
Andrius Giedraitis	1						Bronze medal																																		
Tomas Masiulis	1						Bronze medal																																		
Kęstutis Marčiulionis	1						Bronze medal																																		
Darius Maskoliūnas	1						Bronze medal																																		
Dainius Adomaitis	1						Bronze medal																																		
Andrius Jurkūnas	1							Bronze medal																																	
Tomas Pačėsas	1							Bronze medal																																	
Rytis Vaišvila	1							Bronze medal																																	
Alvydas Pazdrazdis	1									Bronze medal																															
Darius Dimavičius	1									Bronze medal																															
Romanas Brazdauskis	1									Bronze medal																															

== See also ==
- Lithuania national basketball team
- Lithuanian Basketball Federation
- Basketball at the Summer Olympics
- FIBA Basketball World Cup
- FIBA EuroBasket
