= Vincas Sercevičius =

Lithuanian basketball player and coach

- Vincas Sercevičius in 1990s

Personal information
- Born: 26 March 1925 Pustelnikai, Lithuania
- Died: 23 December 2003 (aged 78) Kaunas, Lithuania
- Listed height: 6 ft 2 in (1.88 m)
- Position: Center

Career history
- 1945–1946: Kaunas Dinamas
- 1947–1949: LVKKI
- 1951–1954: Žalgiris

Career highlights
- 5× Lithuanian champion (1947–1950, 1954); 2× USSR champion (1947, 1951); Winner of Lithuanian Cup (1951)

Vincas Sercevičius (26 March 1925 – 23 December 2003) was a Lithuanian basketball player and coach. Together with Stepas Butautas, Vytautas Kulakauskas, Justinas Lagunavičius and Kazys Petkevičius, he was considered as one of the finest Lithuanian basketball players during the first post-war decades. Sercevičius played for the center position and had the outstanding ability to shoot the hook shots with both hands, which earned him the nickname of "The Second Lubinas". However, his international career was impeded by his anti-Soviet political record.

== Biography ==
According to Antanas Kuzdys, Sercevičius was arrested because he refused to purposefully lose a basketball match to a team from Moscow in 1945. He was arrested and sent to mines in Vorkuta by the Soviets. Following his return to Lithuania, he was a candidate to the Soviet Union national basketball team for four straight years, including the team sent to EuroBasket 1947 where it won gold. His place was taken by another Lithuanian, Justinas Lagunavičius. He was not selected because was not allowed to leave the Soviet Bloc due to his arrest.

As a student at Lithuanian National Institute of Physical Education (LVKKI), Sercevičius played for the institute's team. He was also a member of the Lithuania SSR men's national basketball team (1945–51), playing 11 matches and scoring 73 points. Upon graduation in 1951, he joined the legendary Lithuanian club Žalgiris. He coached Žalgiris in 1951 and 1953–55. During his career, Sercevičius won five Lithuanian and two Soviet championships.

After retirement from active sport, he continued to teach at the Lithuanian National Institute of Physical Education until his retirement in 1984.

In 1990s, during one of his interviews, he described his career by telling: "My sporting period was beside Stalin and Brezhnev and we cannot consider that it went as it could went. <…> Being young we had in mind that we represent Kaunas, the republic in the Soviet Union, we fought for our nation, ideas, we acquainted the people that there is such Pabaltijis, such cities. <…> There was a stimulus that we fight for Lithuania and there were games when we reached victories during the crucial moments, however the satisfaction wasn’t complete because we competed for the Lithuanian SSR. <…> Personally, I haven't played till 1940. I was way too young and now I'm already too old".
