= Leonas =

- Gender: Male
- Name day: 20 February (for the Lithuanian name)

Other names
- Related names: Leonardas, Linus, Leon

Leonas is a Lithuanian masculine given name and surname; often a diminutive of Leonardas, and a Lithuanianized form of "Leon".

Leonas (Ancient Greek: Λεωνᾶς) was also a Greek and a Latin name.

== Surname ==
- Petras Leonas (1864–1938), Lithuanian attorney and politician
- Silvestras Leonas (1894–1959), Lithuanian military officer and judge

== Given name ==
- Leonas, a Greek rhetorician and sophist. Mentor of the philosopher Proclus
- Leonas Alesionka (born 1949), Lithuanian politician
- Leonas Apšega (born 1940), Lithuanian politician
- Leonas Baltrūnas (1914–1993), Lithuanian basketball player and coach
- Leonas Bistras (1890–1971), Lithuanian politician, journalist, translator, philosopher and professor
- Leonas Juozapaitis (1901–1980), Lithuanian footballer
- Leonas Koganas (1894–1956), Lithuanian physician
- Leonas Milčius (born 1942), Lithuanian politician
- Leonas Petrauskas (1919–1994), Lithuanian basketball player
- Leonas Prapuolenis (1913–1972), Lithuanian public figure, commander and leader of the June Uprising of 1941 in Lithuania
- Leonas Sapiega (1557–1633), Lithuanian nobleman and statesman
