= Mykolas Ruzgys =

Lithuanian-American basketball player

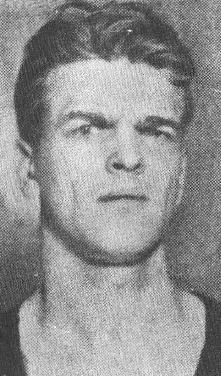
- Mykolas Ruzgys in 1939

Personal information
- Born: January 15, 1915 Chicago, Illinois
- Died: December 15, 1986 (aged 71) Chicago, Illinois
- Height: 6 ft 2 in (1.88 m)
- Weight: 184 lb (83 kg)
Medal record
Men's basketball
Representing Lithuania
FIBA EuroBasket
Gold medal – first place	1939 Kaunas	Team competition

Mykolas Ruzgys or Michael Paul Ruzgis (January 15, 1915 – December 15, 1986) was a Lithuanian-American basketball player. He won gold medal with Lithuania national basketball team during the EuroBasket 1939, held in Kaunas.

After departing from Lithuania due to the World War II and occupations of Lithuania Ruzgys later also was the head coach of the France men's national basketball team and Spain men's national basketball team and coached French, Monacan and Spanish basketball clubs.

== Biography ==
=== Early years and life in Lithuania ===
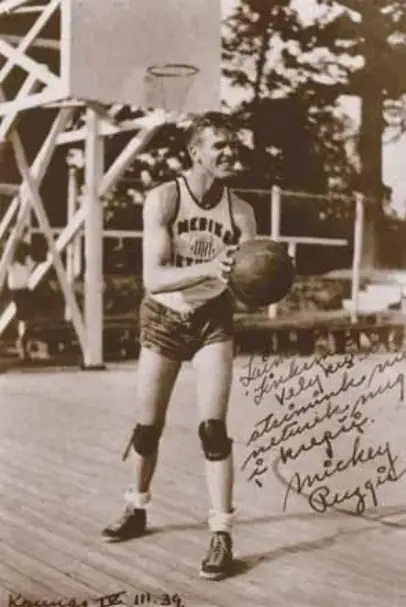
Ruzgys in Kaunas in 1939

Born in the United States as Michael Paul Ruzgis, around 1938 he moved to Kaunas, Lithuania and became CJSO (Lithuanian: Centrinė Jaunalietuvių Sporto Organizacija) basketball team member and player. He was invited to Lithuania national basketball team and became champion of Europe in 1939. He was fifth in scoring during the competition. Furthermore, he was selected the 1939 FIBA EuroBasket MVP.

Ruzgys planned to live in Lithuania after his wife Danutė got pregnant, however Ruzgys and his wife Danutė lived together for just one year. He wished that if his child will be a girl she would be named Lidija. According to a letter of Lidija Ruzgytė father-in-law, "your father was an American citizen. He received a telegram from Kaunas, then another. He did not move. When he received the third telegram, he started crying, and I took him to the Šiauliai Train Station." Then Ruzgys went to Kaunas and received $300 for his departure to the United States.

=== World War II and first family struggles in the occupied Lithuania ===
Ruzgys by starting his journey back to the United States was forced to leave his pregnant wife Danutė in Lithuania. On 16 August 1940, Ruzgys departed from a Finnish Petsamo Province Seaport. On 28 August 1940, Ruzgys arrived to New York City, United States.

Ruzgys was able to communicate with his wife Danutė in occupied Lithuania by sending letters even during the German occupation of Lithuania, however the correspondence has stopped following the Soviet re-occupation of Lithuania. According to Ruzgys wife Danutė sister, Laimute Vitartaite-Poželiene, his wife Danutė was screaming from grief after receiving every letter of Ruzgys. Ruzgys hoped that he will be able to take away his wife to Chicago, United States, however he never saw her again due to the Soviet occupation of Lithuania and never met his daughter, Lidija Ruzgytė, who was born on 30 August 1940, just a few weeks after he left Lithuania. The Soviets allowed the Americans to depart from the occupied Lithuania and Ruzgys' wife Danutė visited the United States Embassy for this matter, moreover, his daughter Lidija had the right to the Citizenship of the United States, however it did not help.

During the World War II Ruzgys began his service in the United States Army on 31 October 1942. He arrived to Europe with his army division on 21 January 1945 and participated in the Western Front against Germany and in the liberation of the Buchenwald concentration camp. He was awarded with the World War II Victory Medal, Good Conduct Medal and served in the United States Army until 26 February 1946.

Ruzgys helped Lithuanian war refugees in Allied-occupied Germany and, according to Lithuanian President Valdas Adamkus, was interested in Lithuania's situation and was grieving by remembering his wife Danutė and daughter Lidija.

The Soviets followed the correspondence between Ruzgys and his wife Danutė in occupied Lithuania and attempted to invite him to coach the Soviet Union men's national basketball team and Russians in Moscow, also they promised him a flat and a possibility to live with his wife and daughter. According to Leonas Baltrūnas (Ruzgys former teammate in the 1939 EuroBasket champions squad), Ruzgys replied to the Soviets offer that he "will not travel to a bandits country". Soon afterwards his wife suffered more Soviet repressions (e.g. to change her surname Ruzgienė if she want to find a work).

Ruzgys daughter Lidija after accidentally hitting her head hard lost hearing and was also unable to speak. Ruzgys wife Danutė parents were helpful raising Lidija, but in March 1949 they together with Ruzgys' daughter Lidija were deported to Siberia. Ruzgys daughter Lidija was not on the list of the deportees (like her grandparents), however the Soviets taken away her together with her grandparents and the deportations in cattle cars were carried out from the Šiauliai Train Station, therefore it was not possible to contact Lidija's mother Danutė and her grandparents refused to leave her alone, thus eight-year-old Lidija was also deported. The deportees arrived in Alzamay, Russian SFSR. Ruzgys wife Danutė, after learning about the deportation of her parents and daughter Lidija, visited Justas Paleckis and he helped to return them to Lithuania on 3 June 1949 because according to the case they were "falsely deported".

Ruzgys wife Danutė temporary changed her surname during the Soviet period, since 1948 lived in Lithuania's capital city Vilnius and worked as physical education teacher (e.g. taught Virgilijus Noreika, Vytautas Landsbergis) and struggled financially, however she never been in a relationship with another man and following the Act of the Re-Establishment of the State of Lithuania in 1990 again signed as "Ruzgienė".

=== Life in France and creation of a second family ===
French newspaper article (1946) about Ruzgys basketball training of Frenchmen

After the World War II, Ruzgys settled in liberated France. While being in France, Ruzgys was appointed as head coach of the France men's national basketball team (1946–1947), created another family with an educated Frenchwoman, Andrée Maloigne, who later gave birth to his four children, and lived in France capital city Paris, where he fell in love with the French culture. Ruzgys never married Andrée, however his children with Andrée initially bore a surname "Ruzgis". He lectured at INSEP. While being the head coach of the France men's national basketball team during EuroBasket 1947 in Prague, Ruzgys had a chance to meet with the 1947 Soviet Union men's national basketball team which included four Lithuanians (Kazys Petkevičius, Stepas Butautas, Vytautas Kulakauskas and Justinas Lagunavičius), who led the Soviet squad to a first EuroBasket title. In a 1968 interview to the Voice of America Ruzgys said that "Russia has adopted Lithuanian techniques and tactics. The last time I saw them was when I was in Prague with the French team. I wanted to cry with joy, because there were four Lithuanians in the team, and one was the captain of their national team. I spoke to Lithuanian players several times, but for understandable reasons, we couldn't communicate any longer" The Ruzgys' coached French squad finished in a disappointing fifth place in EuroBasket 1947 and Ruzgys was replaced by Robert Busnel in the French squad (he became a player-coach), thus Ruzgys departed to Monaco.

=== Life in Monaco ===
Cover of Ruzgys' book Le Basket Ball, 1948

While being in Monaco, Ruzgys coached Monaco team which advanced to the French basketball league final and together with Raymond Offner published a book Le Basket Ball where basketball essentials were presented and in it Ruzgys in photos personally demonstrate basketball moves. Ruzgys was described in that time French press as exceptionally talented. His coaching was noticed by Raimundo Saporta, a Spanish Basketball Federation vice-president, and he invited him to Spain.

=== Life in Spain ===
Ruzgys arrived in Spain with Andrée and his two children and lived in capital city Madrid. Ruzgys sellected players and coached the Spain men's national basketball team in the 1950 FIBA World Championship in Buenos Aires, Argentina, while at the same time coaching one team in the Spanish League, U.D. Huesca. After that, he became player-coach for Bazan Ferrol. The travel by plane with multiple stops to Buenos Aires for the 1950 FIBA World Championship took 36 hours and Spanish players were exhausted, vommitted, some were too weak to sit in the plane, thus were lying. Andrée also travelled together with Ruzgys to Buenos Aires. The French national team players who travelled with the same plane to Buenos Aires felt so weak that they were unable to walk and upon arrival were immediately taken to the hospital. According to the Spanish national team players memoirs, Ruzgys enjoyed consuming alcohol and often exceeded permissible limits with Spanish wine. The Spanish national team finished ninth out of ten teams in the 1950 FIBA World Championship. Following the 1950 FIBA World Championship, Ruzgys stayed in Spain and continued coaching basketball, however the Spanish Basketball Federation terminated contract with him in 1952.

==== Player-coach at Bazán Ferrol ====
In 1953, Ruzgys with his family departed from capital city Madrid to Ferrol (where Spanish Navy Port was located) and became a player-coach of its basketball team Bazán Ferrol, which Ruzgys founded himself. He achieved that an arena with a wooden floor that meets the needs of basketball players would be built and the Bazán Ferrol results were successful.

Bazan also sponsored its own men's and women's basketball teams. The men's A Team was good enough to play in the Second Division, and some say that the shipyard refused a berth in the First for financial reasons. On Monday June 1, 1953, Bazan won the Regions Federation Cup in Valladolid by defeating Español de Valencia 43-30. The newspaper Mundo Deportivo praised the speed of the Bazan players and singled out Rusghise [sic] as their best player, who was also the coach and whose real name was Michael P. Rutzgis.

The 1954 season was arguably Team A's best. In February, Bazan played a home friendly against the Spanish national team; the game ended 69-57. Between May 11–13 Bazan played in the round-robin inter-regional championship held in Valladolid against Águilas de Valladolid, Real Valladolid and Covadonga de Gijón. On Tuesday May 11 Bazan beat Covadonga de Gijón 44-28 with "manifest superiority." On Wednesday Bazan defeated Águilas de Valladolid 59-43. The decisive game was played at noon on Thursday "under a blazing sun" against Real Valladolid. In a "colossal feat" Bazan won 54-39. The outstanding Bazan players of the series were Pardo, Lobón and Polo. The championship advanced the team to the Copa del Generalísimo in Madrid where they would face San Adrián de Barcelona, Estudiantes de Madrid and Real Madrid.

On Thursday May 20, 1954, Bazan left Ferrol for Madrid on the TAF. On Sunday at 7:00 PM Bazan beat San Adrián de Barcelona 64-46. On Monday at 11:00 PM Bazan defeated Estudiantes de Madrid 74-63. On Tuesday at 11:00 PM Bazan succumbed to Real Madrid 37-67. "The superiority of Real Madrid was evident, they were always ahead on the scoreboard." On Wednesday May 26 the team returned from Madrid. "Players of juvenile and junior basketball teams [and] many fans gave the Ferrol sportsmen an affectionate and cordial welcome home" at a transfer railway station forty-one kilometers away from the city.

A short note in the newspaper La Voz de Galicia of June 9, 1954, summed up the extraordinary season thus, "Our unreserved applause for Ruzgis [sic] and those sportsmen he so skilfully trains."...

==== The last year in Spain and separation with his second family ====
Since 1956 Ruzgys and his family members were approached by the Political-Social Brigade members and his family began feeling pressure, local soldiers looked suspicious towards Ruzgys. Moreover, Lithuanians and Poles visited Ruzgys and he spoke with them in the Russian language, which further worsened Spaniards view towards Ruzgys and his second family. Spanish dictator Francisco Franco was a strong anti-communist. Consequently, conflicts within family started regarding the future of the family as Andrée sought to return to France. The conflicts within the family were further fueled by the fact that Ruzgys had a family in occupied Lithuania. According to Ruzgys' son Michel (from his second family), "at one point, dad realized that he was completely out of control. His psychological state deteriorated significantly, so the doctors recommended that he spend several weeks in a clinic. Dad returned from there healthier, but still suffering from depression. The atmosphere in the house was changing." Moreover, according to Ruzgys' son Michel, Ruzgys "started talking about Lithuania – a magical land. At such moments, he would hold an amber necklace in his hands, the main stone of which had an inclusion – a trapped mosquito. The necklace was a family heirloom, brought from Lithuania. My father gave it to my mother when they met in Paris." Ruzgys sought that his second family would move to the United States. One day Spanish agents arrived to their house and took away Ruzgys. The next day his family was taken away to Santiago de Compostela, Ruzgys wife worked at the Economics University and changed her surname to a maiden one, Maloigne. Moreover, his children with Andrée surnames were also changed for political reasons to Maloigne. Separated from Ruzgys, Andrée struggled financially and two of four Ruzgys children from his second family ended up in orphanage.

=== Remaining life in the United States and death ===
On 1 December 1956, Ruzgys departed from Spain and after two weeks arrived in Miami, United States and then returned to his hometown Chicago. Ruzgys sent to his second family in Spain letters and photos until early 1960s and promised that they will move to the United States. According to Ruzgys son Michel, the last letter was received in 1960.

While being in the United States, Ruzgys participated in Lithuanian Americans activities (e.g. in 1957 he played in a friendly game which was organized to commemorate 20 years jubilee of the EuroBasket 1937 title; in 1974 he contributed to the creation of the Lithuanian American team, which played friendly games outside the United States).

In a 1964 letter to his first wife, Danutė, Ruzgys wrote from the United States that his health has improved and that he was not drinking for seven years, he was working everyday and attending many basketball games, he also wrote that he had a few friends, but was "as always in thoughts with you" and that she should "give Lidija a kiss, I think she will be a very beautiful woman. Look that she would kiss you from me." Ruzgys' daughter from his first family, Lidija, won gold and bronze medals of athletics competitions at the 1957 Summer Deaflympics in Milan, Italy. Moreover, Lidija, despite initial Soviet resistance, competed at the 1965 Summer Deaflympics in the United States capital city Washington, D.C., however during it Ruzgys did not met with Lidija, who won gold, silver and two bronze medals.

According to Lithuanian President Valdas Adamkus, Ruzgys was treated from alcoholism in Chicago. In a 1981 letter Lithuanian American Aleksas Lauraitis wrote to Ruzgys' first wife Danutė that he have not heard anything from Ruzgys for a few months and that he heard that Ruzgys was again drinking alcohol. Moreover, according to Aleksas Lauraitis, Ruzgys in the United States found a third girlfriend, worked as a shop assistant and in the very end of his life stopped drinking alcohol.

In December 1986, Ruzgys was transported to a hospital in Chicago, United States. After a few days in hospital, Ruzgys died on 15 December 1986 in Chicago, United States. For years his death remained unknown for many interested. For example, Leonas Baltrūnas in 1992 wrote to Ruzgys' first wife Danutė and asked if she has an address of Ruzgys.

In 1996, Ruzgys daughter Lidija was granted the Citizenship of the United States, however she did not return to the United States and died in 2019 (being 79 years old), while her mother, Danutė, died in 2005 (being 86 years old). Danutė until her death never forgot her biggest love, Ruzgys.

According to Ruzgys son from his second family, Michel, his father's favorite quote was of Blaise Pascal: "the heart has its own motives that the mind does not know."

== Sources ==
- Vidas Mačiulis, Vytautas Gudelis. Halė, kurioje žaidė Lubinas ir Sabonis. 1939–1989. – Respublikinis sporto kombinatas, Kaunas, 1989.
- El catálogo del buen Ferrolano. Historiabasket.blogspot.com.es.
- Mundo Deportivo (1953).
