= Pranas (given name) =

- Gender: Male
- Language: Lithuanian
- Name day: 17 September

Origin
- Region of origin: Lithuania

Other names
- Related names: Pranciškus; Pranė (feminine form)

Pranas is a Lithuanian masculine given name. It is a cognate of the English language name Frank. People with the name Pranas include:

- Pranas Čepėnas (1899–1980), Lithuanian historian, encyclopedist, journalist and lexicographer
- Pranas Domšaitis (1880–1965), Lithuanian painter
- Pranas Dovydaitis (1886-1942), Lithuanian politician, former Prime Minister of Lithuania
- Pranas Giedrimas, Lithuanian sport shooter
- Pranas Končius (1911–1965), Lithuanian anti-Soviet partisan
- Pranas Kūris (born 1938), Lithuanian lawyer, judge and ambassador
- Pranas Lesauskis (1900–1942), Lithuanian soldier, management specialist and mathematician
- Pranas Lubinas also known as Frank Lubin (1910–1999), Lithuanian-born American basketball player and Olympic medalist
- Pranas Mažeika (1917–2010), Lithuanian basketball player
- Pranas Morkūnas (1900–1941), Lithuanian translator and Dadaist poet
- Pranas Skardžius (1899–1975), Lithuanian linguist
- Pranas Talzūnas also known as Frank Talzunas (1913–1984), American-born Lithuanian basketball player
- Pranas Vaičaitis (1876–1901), Lithuanian poet
- Pranas Vilkas (born 1936), Lithuanian politician
