= Konstantinas Savickas =

American lawyer and Lithuanian basketball coach (1908-1992)

Konstantinas Savickas

Arvydas Sabonis (left) and Konstantinas Savickas (right), 1988

Konstantinas Savickas (Americanized his name as Connie Savickas; October 14, 1908, Punsk – 1992, Chicago) was an American lawyer and Lithuanian basketball coach. He is often regarded as the father of Lithuanian basketball.

== Biography ==
In 1909, he emigrated to the United States with his parents. In Chicago, he achieved secondary education and graduated Northwestern University in 1929 by achieving Bachelor of Laws. As a student he actively exercised, in 1933-1935 he was editing Lithuanian youth newspaper "Vytis".

In 1935–1936, he lived in Kaunas, worked at Physical Culture Palace as a sports instructor. Basketball situation in Lithuania was deplorable at that time, tragic loss to Latvia with huge difference was a perfect proof of that. As a result, Savickas started coaching Lithuania national basketball team in 1935 and improved it a lot. He invited well-known Lithuanian-American basketball players Pranas Talzūnas, Feliksas Kriaučiūnas, Juozas Žukas and B.Budrikas to Lithuania. In Kaunas, 1936, he published his book "Krepšinis" (English: "Basketball"), wrote various articles about physical education. In 1937, Lithuania lost to Latvia again but only with score of 29:41, which was a huge improvement. Just before EuroBasket 1937, he transferred his head coach post to Feliksas Kriaučiūnas. Lithuania won EuroBasket for the first time during that competition in Latvia.

After the end of EuroBasket 1937, Savickas returned to United States where he stayed until 1991 as the Soviet occupation of Lithuania meant he was unable to return home.

He returned to Lithuania only in 1991, just one year before his death, to participate in IV Lithuanian World Sports Games. Giving interview to daily newspaper Lietuvos rytas he said:

"Tikiu, kad išaugs nauji saboniai ir marčiulioniai, ir vėl susiburs nauja gera komanda" (English: I believe that new Sabonis and Marčiulions will grow up and will create a new superb team again)

He said that by observing future and without knowing that he will not have a chance to see future Lithuania national basketball team victories. Savickas died in the beginning of June, 1992, in Chicago, just a few months before tremendous Lithuania national team victory in 1992 Summer Olympics against Unified Team (team formed from the former USSR countries, except the Baltic States) during the Olympic bronze game.
