= Leonardas =

- Gender: Male

Origin
- Origin: Leonhard
- Meaning: lion strength, lion hearth
- Region of origin: Lithuania

Other names
- Related names: Leonas

Leonardas is a Lithuanian masculine given name.

== List of people named Leonardas ==
- Leonardas Abramavičius (?-1960), Lithuanian chess player
- Leonardas Andriekus (1914-2003), Lithuanian poet
