= Mindaugas Šliūpas =

Lithuanian basketball player (1919–1979)

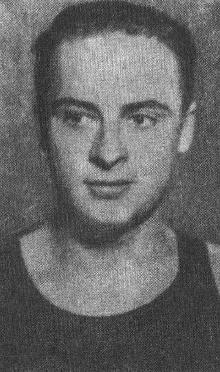
- Mindaugas Šliūpas in 1939

Personal information
- Born: 5 May 1919 Kaunas, Lithuania
- Died: February 3, 1979 (aged 59)
- Height: 6 ft 0 in (1.83 m)
Medal record
Men's basketball
Representing Lithuania
FIBA EuroBasket
Gold medal – first place	1939 Kaunas	Team competition

Mindaugas Šliūpas (1919–1979) was a Lithuanian basketball player. He won a gold medal with the Lithuania national basketball team during EuroBasket 1939. He played one game against Finland and scored no points.

== Biography ==
He was a son of physician Rokas Šliūpas and nephew of activist Jonas Šliūpas. After graduating from the Kaunas War School, he studied law at the Vytautas Magnus University. On 15–22 April 1945, while World War II was still ongoing, the Soviet Union organized the 6th tournament of eight cities in Kaunas. Šliūpas was the only team member who played in the EuroBasket 1939. The Lithuanian team won all games except it tied with the Moscow team 25:25. The Moscow team evened out the score after being awarded questionable free throws and was declared the overall winner of the tournament based on the overall points scored during the tournament. After the tournament, several Lithuanian basketball players, including Šliūpas, Vincas Sercevičius, Stasys Šačkus, Vilius Variakojis, were arrested and deported to Gulag camps. Šliūpas was arrested on 16 June 1945 and was imprisoned in a Dalstroy camp in the Magadan Oblast. He was released in 1956 and returned to Lithuania. Upon his return, he worked in land improvement and drainage.
