= Andrulis =

- Lithuanian surname
- m.: Andrulis
- f.: (unmarried): Andrulytė
- f.: (married): Andrulienė

Andrulis is a Lithuanian language family name. It may refer to:

- Greg Andrulis, American soccer coach
- Artūras Andrulis, Lithianian basketballer
- Viktorija Andrulytė, Lithuanian yacht racer
