= Baltrūnas =

- Lithuanian surname
- m.: Baltrūnas
- f.: (unmarried): Baltrūnaitė
- f.: (married): Baltrūnienė

Baltrūnas is a Lithuanian surname.

- Laimė Baltrūnaitė Lithuanian lawyer, judge of the Supreme Administrative Court of Lithuania
- Leonas Baltrūnas (1914–1993), Lithuanian basketball player and coach
