= Česlovas Daukša =

Lithuanian basketball player (born 1916)

Personal information
- Born: 1916 Saint Petersburg, Russian Empire
- Died: Unknown
- Height: 5 ft 10.5 in (1.79 m)
Medal record
Men's basketball
Representing Lithuania
FIBA EuroBasket
Gold medal – first place	1937 Riga	Team competition

Česlovas Daukša (born 1916, date of death unknown) was a Lithuanian basketball player. He won gold medal with Lithuania national basketball team during EuroBasket 1937.

== Biography ==
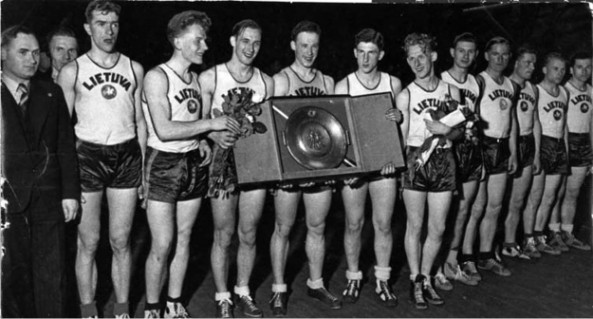
Česlovas Daukša (first from the right)

Daukša born in Saint Petersburg, Russian Empire. After returning to Lithuania with his parents, he graduated six classes in Kaunas Aušra gymnasium. Later he worked at "Spindulys" printing house. Despite playing football from an early age, in 1935 he became a basketball player and in the same year, he debuted in Lithuania men's national basketball team during painful loss to the Latvia men's national basketball team.

After Konstantinas Savickas began training Lithuania national team, Lithuania game play improved drastically. Daukša was a member of the Lithuania men's national team during EuroBasket 1937 and won gold medal with it, after playing in one game and scoring two points.

After World War II, he worked at Republican Physical Education and Sport Committee and other sports organizations. He retired in 1987 and later lived in Kaunas, Lithuania. Daukša is deceased.

== Sources ==
- Vidas Mačiulis, Vytautas Gudelis. Halė, kurioje žaidė Lubinas ir Sabonis. 1939–1989 – Respublikinis sporto kombinatas, Kaunas, 1989
