= Vytautas Budriūnas =

Lithuanian basketball player (1908–2003)

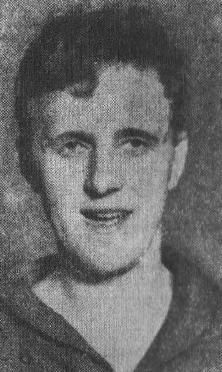
- Budriūnas in 1939

Personal information
- Born: December 19, 1908 Waukegan, Illinois, U.S.
- Died: June 28, 2003 (aged 94) Wisconsin, U.S.
- Height: 6 ft 2 in (1.88 m)
- Weight: 192 lb (87 kg)
Medal record
Men's basketball
Representing Lithuania
FIBA EuroBasket
| Gold medal – first place | 1939 Kaunas | Team competition |

Vytautas Budriūnas with Lithuania team

Vytautas Budriūnas (Americanized his first name as Walter "Whitey", last name as Budrunas or Budrun; born December 19, 1908; died June 28, 2003) was a Lithuanian basketball player. He won gold medal at EuroBasket 1939 with Lithuania national basketball team. He was notable for his one-handed jumpshot (he used it because of a left arm that never straightened after being broken) and is one of the hookshot founders.

== Biography ==
In 1934, he graduated from Marquette University. He played for the college stars team (Marquette University team). In 1938, he arrived in Lithuania and competed for the Lithuania national basketball team during EuroBasket 1939. During EuroBasket 1939 he scored 73 points combined.

Later he returned to the United States and worked as a coach and school sports director (1940–1959).

In 2007, he ranked fourth in a listing of the best-known Lithuanian basketball players.

== Sources ==
- Stanislovas Stonkus, Vytautas Budriūnas - Visuotinė lietuvių enciklopedija, T. III (Beketeriai-Chakasai). – Vilnius: Science and encyclopedia publishing institute, 2003, page 563
- Vidas Mačiulis, Vytautas Gudelis. Halė, kurioje žaidė Lubinas ir Sabonis. 1939–1989 – Respublikinis sporto kombinatas, Kaunas, 1989
