= Zenonas Puzinauskas =

Lithuanian basketball player

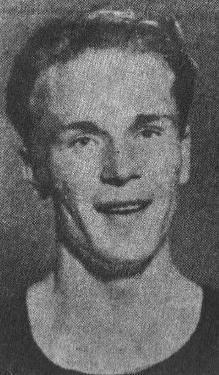
- Zenonas Puzinauskas in 1939

Personal information
- Born: March 4, 1920 Kulva, Jonava County, Lithuania
- Died: July 16, 1995 (aged 75) Beverly Shores, Indiana, U.S.
- Height: 6 ft 4 in (1.93 m)
- Weight: 198 lb (90 kg)
Medal record
Men's basketball
Representing Lithuania
FIBA EuroBasket
Gold medal – first place	1937 Riga	Team competition
Gold medal – first place	1939 Kaunas	Team competition

Zenonas Puzinauskas (March 4, 1920 – July 16, 1995) was a Lithuanian basketball player. He won two gold medals with the Lithuania national basketball team during EuroBasket 1937 and EuroBasket 1939.

== Biography ==
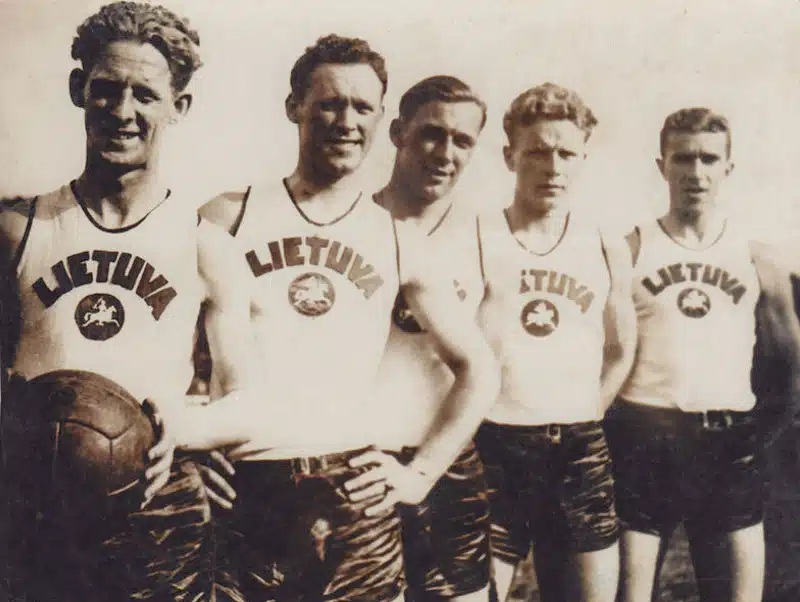
Puzinauskas (second from the right) with the 1937 Lithuania men's national team teammates

Puzinauskas was born in the village of Kulva, Jonava County, Lithuania. He graduated from Kaunas Jėzuitai Gymnasium and from Vytautas Magnus University (philosophy and physical education degree). In 1935, he started to play basketball for the Kaunas "Grandies" club. He played for the Lithuania men's national basketball team twice (1937, 1939) and became European champion both times. Aside from being the youngest player on the team, he was also a scholar athlete.

In 1944 he moved to Austria and later to Germany. He worked as an interpreter in the United States Army and played for the Kempton Šarūnas Lithuanian emigrants basketball team. He was an active war refugee sport organizer. In 1947, in Augsburg, he was nominated as the Lithuanian emigrants' Physical Education and Sports Association chairman. He spoke and read Lithuanian, Russian, Greek, French, Spanish, Italian, and English, and he had a strong command and understanding of Ancient Greek and Latin.

In 1951 he moved to the United States and worked at the Young Men's Christian Association (YMCA), Chicago department. Later he worked for the Red Cross. He was also active in Lithuanian emigrants activities. His wife was Ona Puzinauskas (1922–2021), and they had one daughter, Dalia K Puzinauskas (Wendt). In 1987, he moved to Beverly Shores, Indiana, where he died in 1995.

== State awards ==
- Lithuania: 1st degree Medal of the Order of Vytautas the Great (1937)

== Sources ==
- Jungtinių Amerikos Valstijų lietuviai. (II t.) – Mokslo ir enciklopedijų leidybos centras, Vilnius, 2002
- Vidas Mačiulis, Vytautas Gudelis. Halė, kurioje žaidė Lubinas ir Sabonis. 1939–1989 – Respublikinis sporto kombinatas, Kaunas, 1989
