= Hook shot =

Basketball play

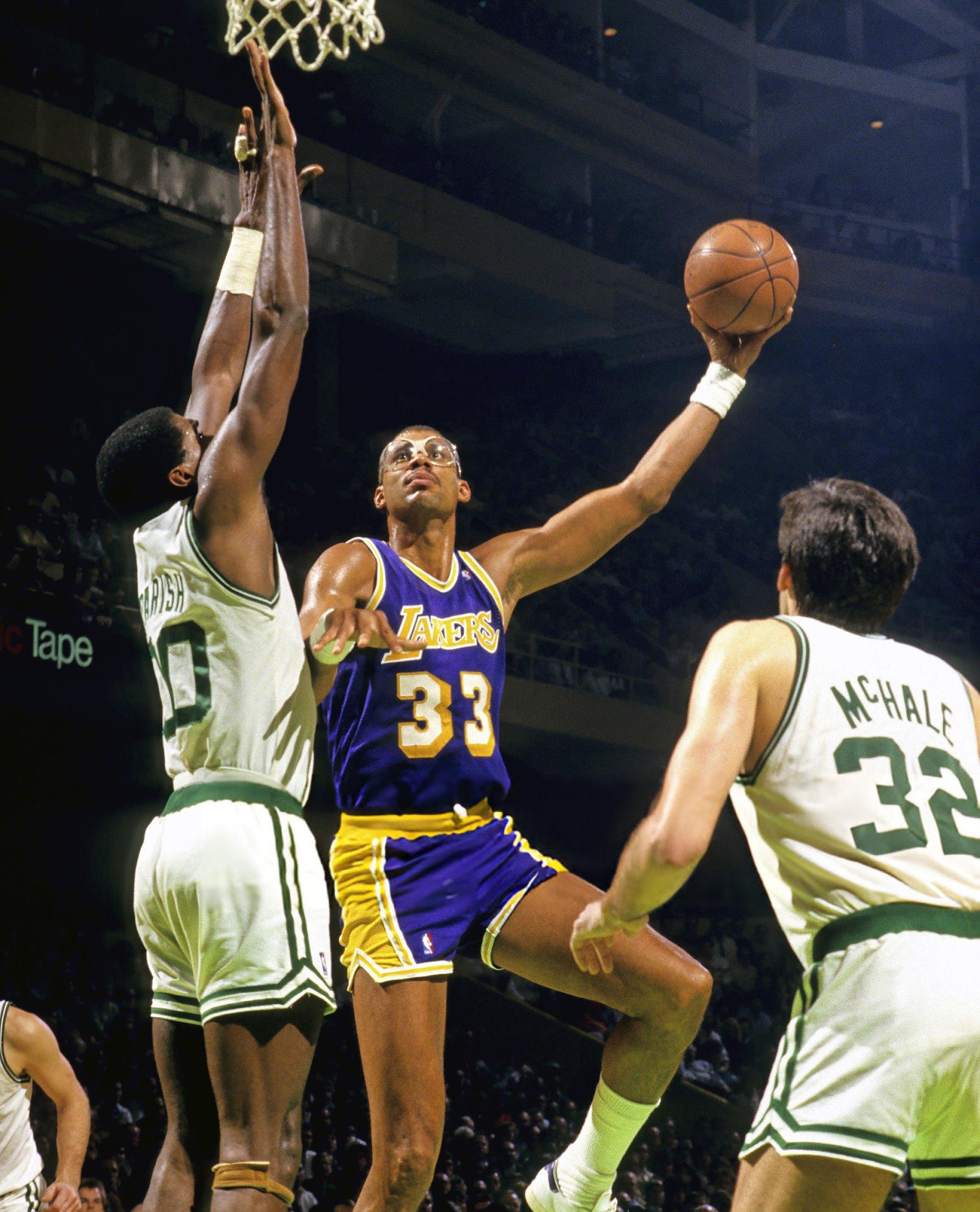
Kareem Abdul-Jabbar performing his signature Skyhook in 1987

In basketball, a hook shot is a play where the offensive player, usually turned perpendicular to the basket, gently throws the ball using a sweeping motion of the arm farther from the basket in an upward arc with a follow-through which ends over their head. Unlike the jump shot, it is performed with only one hand; the other arm is often used to create space between the shooter and the defensive player. The shot is quite difficult to block, but only a small number of players have mastered it more than a few feet from the basket.

The hook shot was reportedly performed for the first time during official games in Eurobasket 1937 by Pranas Talzūnas, a member of the eventual champions, the Lithuania basketball team. Former Harlem Globetrotter Goose Tatum is often credited with inventing the hook shot; he even shot them without looking at the basket. The hook shot later became a staple of many players in the National Basketball Association (NBA), including stars such as George Mikan, Kareem Abdul-Jabbar, Magic Johnson, Vlade Divac, Wilt Chamberlain and Yao Ming.

In FIBA games, hook shots were a favored skill for centers before slam dunks became more popular, mostly because of the relative difficulty of blocking such shots.

== Skyhook ==
NBA's Naismith Memorial Basketball Hall of Famer George Mikan developed a devastating hook shot while playing for DePaul University in the mid-1940s, as did Jerry Lucas playing for Ohio State 15 years later.

The hook shot became a trademark of Kareem Abdul-Jabbar, the National Basketball Association's second-place all-time leading scorer, who was proficient at the shot at a much greater distance from the basket than most players. The greater distance and resulting higher arc on the shot led to the name skyhook, which was coined during Abdul-Jabbar's tenure with the Milwaukee Bucks by the team's radio announcer, Eddie Doucette, who stated "that hook was so high that it was coming out of the sky". The skyhook was almost never blocked, and it was accomplished by only a few players known for their extreme height like Wilt Chamberlain and Manute Bol.

Magic Johnson used a similar shooting technique during the 1987 NBA Finals, which he called his "baby hook" in deference to teammate Abdul-Jabbar.

== Jump hook ==
Due to the increasingly physical nature of low post basketball, the "jump hook" has become a more popular style of hook shot, and has been employed by many players including centers Shaquille O'Neal and Dwight Howard. The player jumps off using two feet, instead of taking steps and then jumping off using one foot. The jump hook provides for better balance as well as a quicker release, though the shot will not be released from as high in the air. According to Hakeem Olajuwon, it is a "necessary shot that every center should have", because it is very difficult to block.

Former #1 pick in the 1962 NBA draft, Billy "The Hill" McGill, was known for using the jump hook shot in both his college and pro careers.

== See also ==
- Basketball moves
- NBA records
