= Leonas Apšega =

Lithuanian politician

Leonas Apšega (born 10 December 1940) is a Lithuanian politician. In 1990 he was among those who signed the Act of the Re-Establishment of the State of Lithuania.
