= Leonardas Andriekus =

Lithuanian poet

Leonardas Andriekus (July 15, 1914, in Barstyčiai, district of Mažeikiai, Lithuania – 2003) was a Lithuanian poet.
