= EuroBasket 1939 =

International basketball event

Tournament details
- Host country: Lithuania
- City: Kaunas
- Dates: 21–28 May
- Teams: 8
- Venue: 1 (in 1 host city)

Final positions
- Champions: Lithuania (2nd title)
- Runners-up: Latvia
- Third place: Poland
- Fourth place: France

Tournament statistics
- Games played: 28
- MVP: (Lithuania) Mykolas Ruzgys (de facto: (Lithuania) Pranas Lubinas)^{‡}
- Top scorer: (Estonia) Heino Veskila (16.7 points per game)

The 1939 FIBA European Championship, commonly called FIBA EuroBasket 1939, was the third FIBA EuroBasket regional basketball championship, held by FIBA. Eight national teams affiliated with the International Basketball Federation (FIBA) took part in the competition. Defending champions Lithuania hosted the tournament, held in Kaunas Sports Hall.

== Tickets ==
The prices for tickets were high at the time: The price for a seat was 2.5–5 LTL, and for a standing spot 1.5–2 LTL.

== Venue ==
Kaunas Sports Hall in 2014

One of the toughest questions before the competition was the venue to host the games of the Third European Basketball Championship. The First European Championship was held in a converted exhibitions hall, while the second one in converted former factory premises. It was first suggested to organize the competition in an open-court with a hanging tarpaulin roof, which would provide shelter against the rain, in the then State Court (currently Darius and Girėnas Stadium). Although, nor the Lithuanian officials, nor the FIBA had found such solution suitable. Therefore, it was decided to build a completely new sports hall to host the basketball games. Anatolijus Rozenbliumas designed the new basketball hall with capacity of 11.000 people (3.500 seats). The construction works cost around 400.000 LTL. The Kaunas Sports Hall was built on time. Many laypeople helped with the construction. One of them, Donatas Banionis, remembers: "I remember the 1939 European Championship in Kaunas. The Kaunas Sports Hall was built that year. On the eve of the tournament I learned from friends that they need help to number the benches. People were promised that they could attend the games for free. This, for us – boys, was a staggering thing. The cheapest ticket to attend all games cost 10 LTL, so I accurately numbered the benches with dye".

According to Marie-Eugène Bouge, a 1938–1945 President of the French Federation of Basketball, already at the time basketball was incredibly popular in Lithuania and the arena, which seats more than ten thousand people, was full every day during EuroBasket 1939, while a few thousand more spectators who came found the ticket office closed.

== Opening and closing ceremonies ==
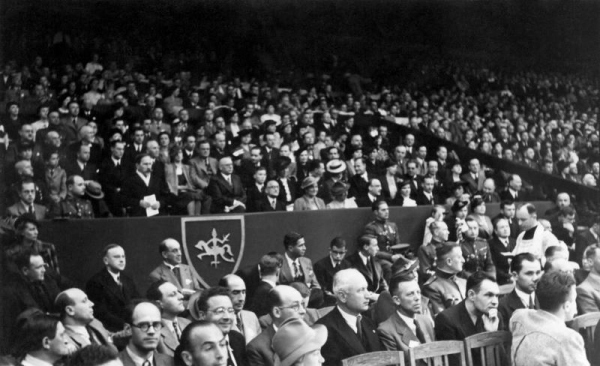
EuroBasket 1939 opening ceremony, Lithuanian President Antanas Smetona is standing and holding papers in a tribune

The opening ceremony of the EuroBasket 1939 took place on 21 May 1939. Independent Lithuania sports historian, Jonas Narbutas, wrote: "The interest in the competition, of course, was huge. But still it was hardly imaginable that an event that big could attract such masses. It seemed that the whole Kaunas flooded the National Stadium. Tides of people attended the Vytautas hill: by foot, by driving. Generations of times swam into the hall: near the gray-headed there was his aging son with his children, small and big swam, of all ages and castes. The hall possibly sheltered 10.000 of people. It is doubtful that more could fit there. It was possible to sell 20.000 tickets to the opening and the closing ceremonies". The opening ceremony was started by the Lithuanian president Antanas Smetona speech.

== Teams and their compositions ==
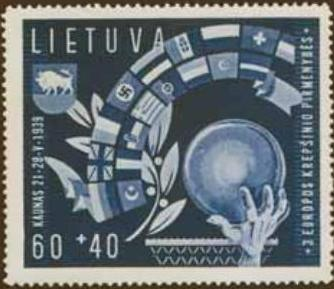
Lithuanian postage stamp with flags of the planned EuroBasket 1939 participants

At first, after sending the invitations, 17 countries wished to compete. Even the basketball newcomers Great Britain, Turkey, and Germany planned to participate in it. Because of this, one of the issued postage stamp had flags of 17 countries. Though, when Kaunas was waiting for the guests from all the European countries, World War II phantom was already wandering in Europe. That changed things, with some of the 17 planned countries no longer interested in participating in the tournament.

Eight teams arrived. Despite that, all the strongest teams of the EuroBasket 1937 participated (Lithuania, Italy, France). The championship prestige was also raised with the very capable Baltic teams participation (Latvia, Estonia). Most of the teams arrived at Kaunas firmly strengthened: Lithuania, Poland, Estonia, Latvia, Italy national teams had emigrants, who finished studies in the United States of America.

Everyone was thrilled with the question: will tall (unlimited) height players participation be allowed? At that time FIBA had a rule which distributed players into two groups: lower than 190 cm (6 ft 3 in) and taller than 190 cm. Though, this rule never was used practically. Two teams had players taller than 190 cm: Estonia (Ralf Viksten; 198 cm, 6 ft 6 in) and Lithuania (Pranas Lubinas; 200 or 201 cm, 6 ft 7 in). Just one day before the competition, FIBA Technical Committee reached a decision allowing players of all heights to compete.

== Gallery ==
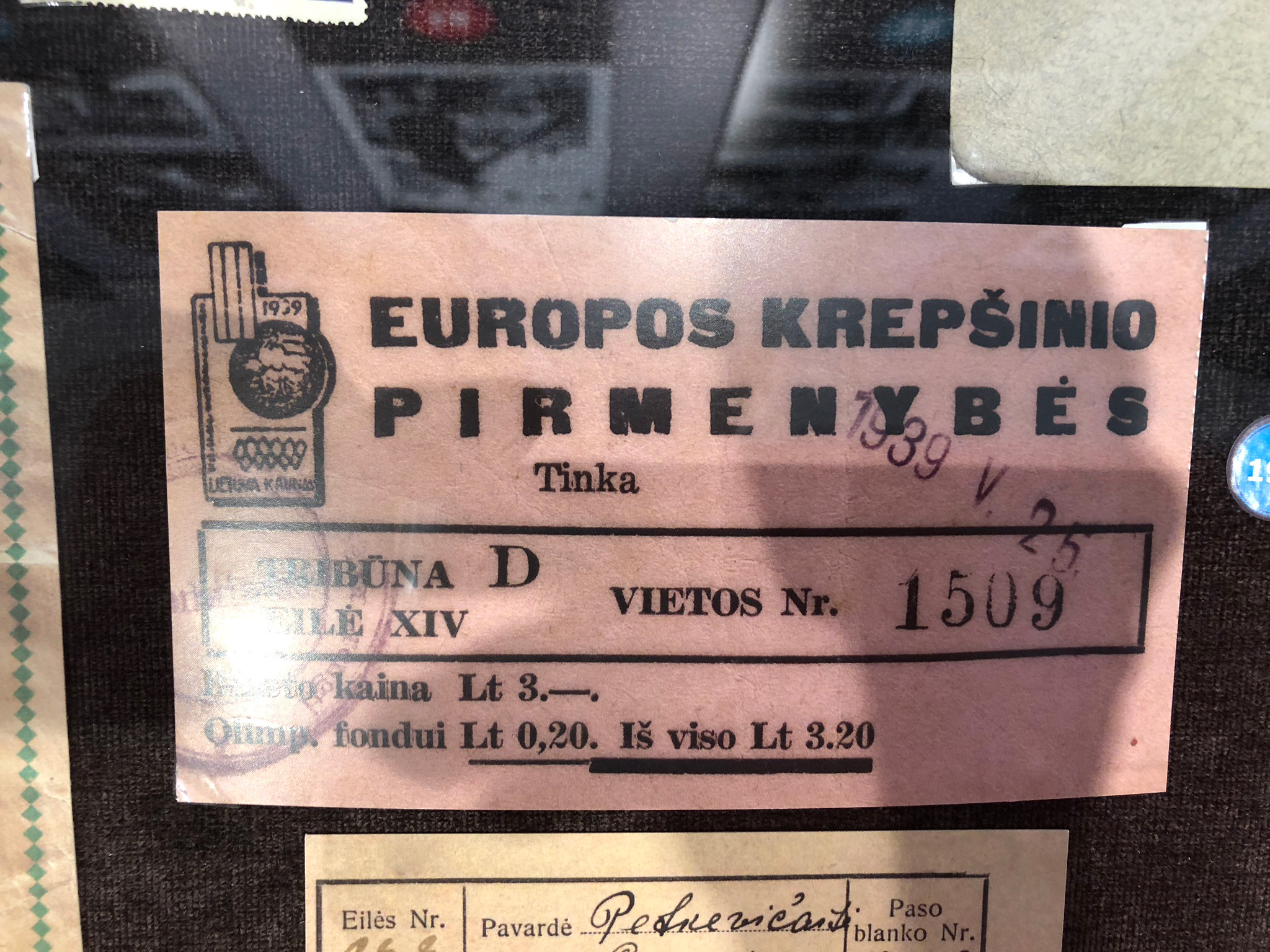
EuroBasket 1939 ticket

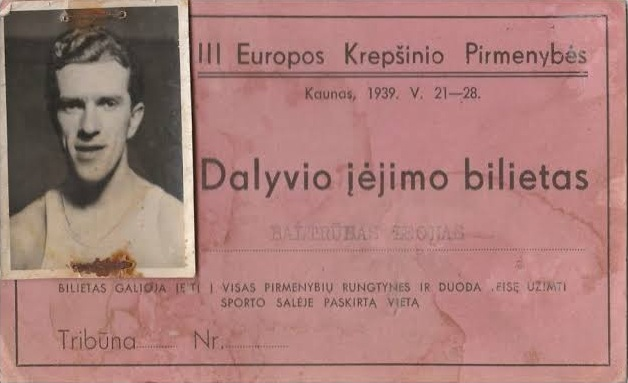
Participant ticket of Lithuania's player Leonas Baltrūnas

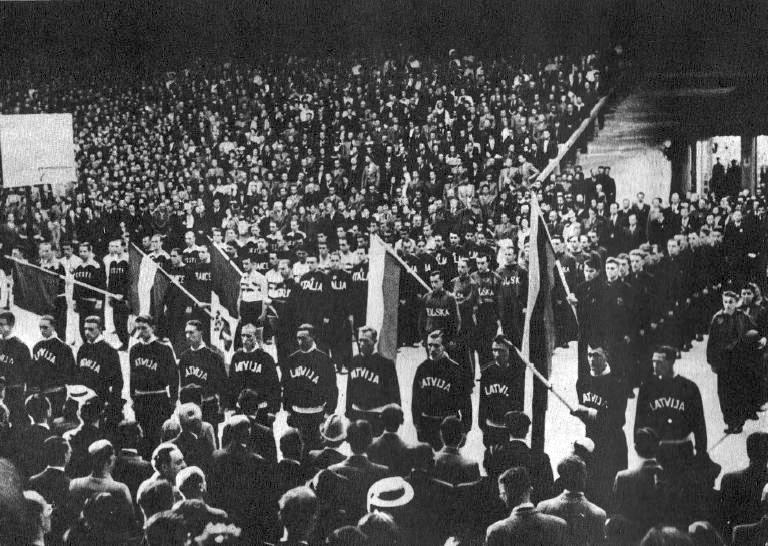
EuroBasket 1939 opening ceremony

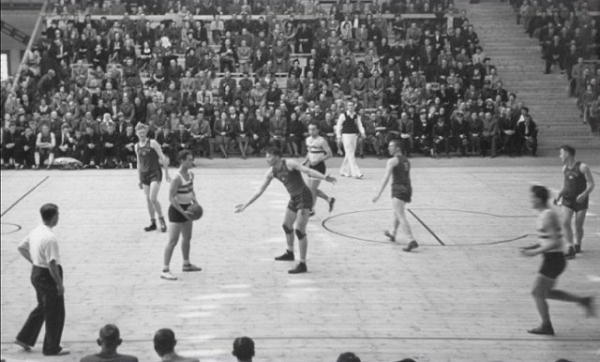
Lithuania–Hungary game during EuroBasket 1939

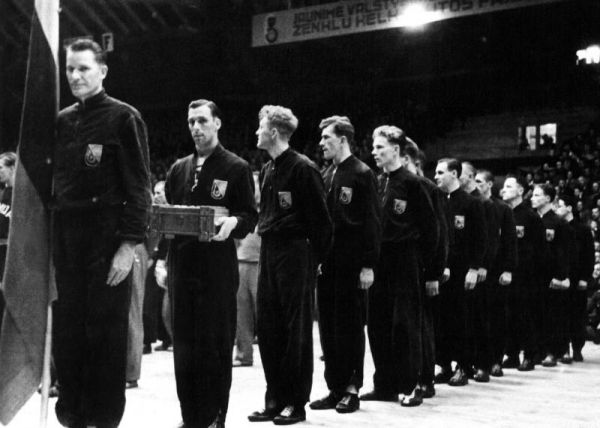
Lithuania men's national basketball team during the closing ceremony of the EuroBasket 1939

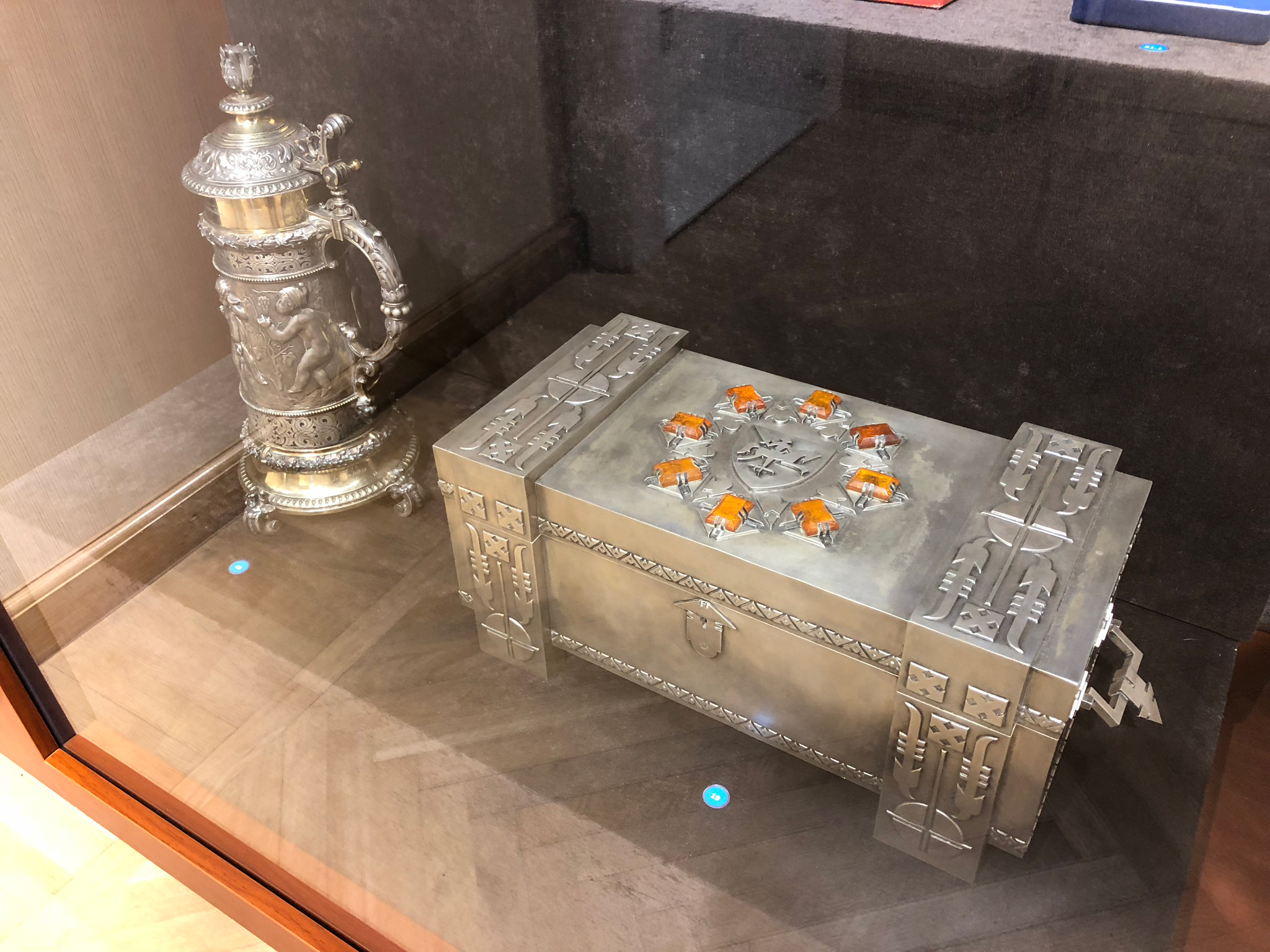
Lithuania's President Antanas Smetona presidential gift to the champions (a chest)

== Results ==
The 1939 competition was in a very simple format. Each team played each of the other teams once. A win was worth 2 standings points, a loss worth 1. The rankings were based on those standing points. Ties were broken by head-to-head results. The winning team was Lithuania. In retrospect, the most important match was Lithuania vs Latvia in the first round. Lithuania won by 1 point, and this was the eventual winning margin of the championship. Relations between the two nations soured to such an extent that it led to the cancellation of the subsequent 1939 Baltic Cup football tournament.

=== Match results ===
Lithuania	37–36	Latvia

Poland	40–36	Estonia

France	76–11	Finland

Italy	39–21	Hungary

Lithuania	33–14	Estonia

Latvia	58–24	Hungary

Poland	38–36	France

Italy	63–13	Finland

Lithuania	46–18	Poland

Latvia	108–7	Finland

France	31–24	Italy

Estonia	64–18	Hungary

Lithuania	48–18	France

Latvia	38–23	Italy

Poland	42–20	Hungary

Estonia	91–1	Finland

Lithuania	79–15	Hungary

Latvia	45–26	France

Poland	46–13	Finland

Estonia	29–22	Italy

Lithuania	112–9	Finland

Poland	43–27	Italy

France	45–19	Hungary

Estonia	26–25	Latvia

Lithuania	41–27	Italy

Latvia	43–20	Poland

France	33–31	Estonia

Hungary	45–16	Finland

1939 FIBA EuroBasket champions

Lithuania
2nd title

== Final standings ==
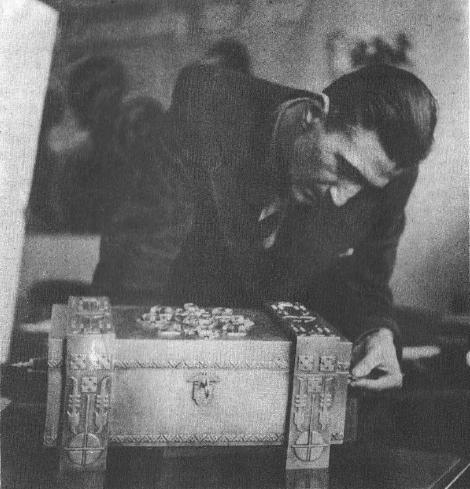
EuroBasket 1939 presidential prize. A silver chest decorated with ambers.

Rank	Team	Pld	W	L	PF	PA	PD	Pts
1st place, gold medalist(s)	Lithuania	7	7	0	396	137	+259	14
2nd place, silver medalist(s)	Latvia	7	5	2	353	163	+190	12
3rd place, bronze medalist(s)	Poland	7	5	2	242	216	+26	12
4.	France	7	4	3	265	216	+49	11
5.	Estonia	7	4	3	286	167	+119	11
6.	Italy	7	2	5	225	216	+9	9
7.	Hungary	7	1	6	162	343	−181	8
8.	Finland	7	0	7	70	541	−471	7

Source: fibaeurope.com

== Team rosters ==
Lithuania's Lubinas previously played for the gold medal-winning United States national basketball team at the 1936 Summer Olympics.

1. Lithuania: Pranas Lubinas, Mykolas Ruzgys, Feliksas Kriaučiūnas, Leonas Baltrūnas, Zenonas Puzinauskas, Artūras Andrulis, Pranas Mažeika, Leonas Petrauskas, Eugenijus Nikolskis, Vytautas Norkus, Juozas Jurgėla, Mindaugas Šliūpas, Vytautas Budriūnas, Vytautas Lesčinskas (Coach: Pranas Lubinas)

2. Latvia: Visvaldis Melderis, Kārlis Ārens, Jānis Graudiņš, Teodors Grīnbergs, Maksis Kazāks, Alfrēds Krauklis, Voldemārs Šmits, Juris Solovjovs, Aleksandrs Vanags, Kārlis Satiņš (Coach: Valdemārs Baumanis)

3. Poland: Paweł Stok, Bogdan Bartosiewicz, Jerzy Gregołajtis, Florian Grzechowiak, Zdzisław Kasprzak, Ewaryst Łój, Stanisław Pawlowski, Zbigniew Resich, Jerzy Rossudowski, Jarosław Śmigielski (Coach: Walenty Kłyszejko)

4. France: Robert Busnel, Vladimir Fabrikant, Henri Lesmayoux, Fernand Prudhomme, Jean Jeammes, Etienne Roland, Emile Frezot, Robert Cohu, Maurice Mertz, Abel Gravier, Andre Ambroise, Gaston Falleur, Gabriel Gonnet, Alexandre Katlama (Coach: Paul Geist)

5. Estonia: Heino Veskila, Evald Mahl, Oskar Erikson, Ralf Viksten, Georg Vinogradov, Erich Altosaar, Artur Amon, Hans Juurup, Valdeko Valdmäe, Herbert Tillemann (Coach: Herbert Niiler)
