= Pranas Talzūnas =

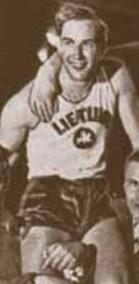
- Pranas Talzūnas in 1937

Personal information
- Born: May 23, 1913 Chicago, Illinois, U.S.
- Died: 1984
- Listed height: 1.82–1.83 m (6 ft 0 in – 6 ft 0 in)
Medals
Men's basketball
Representing Lithuania
FIBA EuroBasket
Gold medal – first place	1937 Riga	Team competition

Pranas Konstantinas Talzūnas (born as Frank Konstant Talzunas; May 23, 1913 in Chicago – 1984) was a Lithuanian American basketball player.

== Biography ==
Talzūnas won a gold medal with the Lithuania men's national basketball team during the EuroBasket 1937, held in Riga. Pranas was named MVP of EuroBasket 1937 and is regarded as the first player to use the hook shot. Talzūnas attitude toward the game, the matches and the representing of the nation seriousness are perfectly described by his words after the successful competition ending: "I confess that going to Riga I had no clue what to thought: whenever we will win or not. I didn't knew how our upcoming opponents plays. <...> We won deservedly, however <...> it wasn't easy. <...> The concern of the upcoming battles for me and for Feliksas Kriaučiūnas didn't let us to sleep for any single night. <...> We were considering the victories possibilities for hours and still doubted it. Now everything is over. For me the heaviest stone just fall from the chest".

== Player profile ==
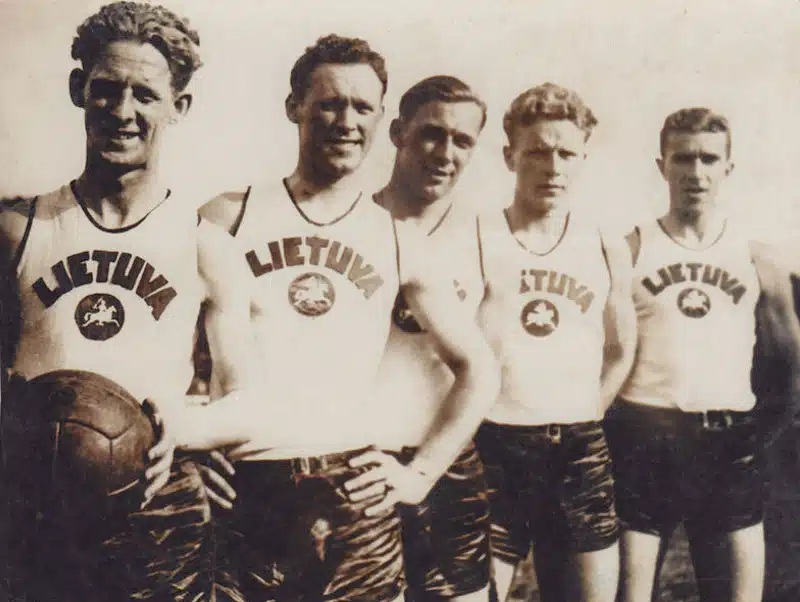
Talzūnas (second from the left) with other members of the 1937 Lithuania men's national team

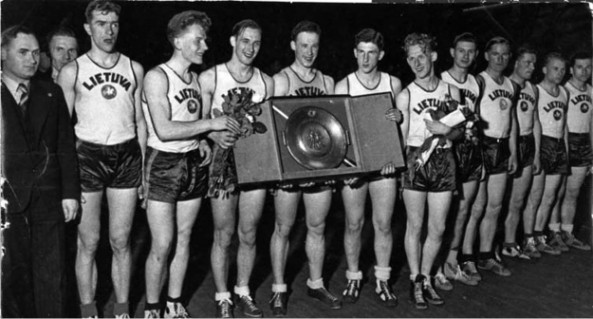
Pranas Talzūnas, holding the trophy (sixth from the left)

Pranas Talzūnas game-play was perfectly described by the sport journalist Juozas Kusa: "Talzūnas doesn't like to shoot from far, he scores all the points from under the basket. <...> It is his specialty and that his ability was overshadowed rarely by defender at least once. Just look – he got the ball, discreetly turned around, the defender is left at the other side, the, most frequently, right hand rises and the basket is done. He is also capable to shoot from far: he shot only once versus Italy and implanted it".

Juris Silarājs, a Latvia national team member in 1939, who vigilantly spectated the second European championship, described him by saying: "P. Talzūnas wasn't very tall, possibly 182–183 centimeters, however he was a tightly structured athlete. <...> The whole Lithuania national team game was based on P. Talzūnas. <...> The attack was started by F. Kriaučiūnas, then the ball was reaching Žukas and he was passing it to the P. Talzūnas, who was finishing the attack. We saw a new way to shoot into the basket: by having the ball, standing at his back to the basket, P. Talzūnas was jumping by turning into the basket and was sending the ball to the basket with his both hands".

Olgert Altberg, the famous Latvian basketball coach, theoretician and professor, described Talzūnas by telling: "P. Talzūnas has shown the shot over the head for the first time – a hook shot. Nobody saw such shooting way before".

From the Latvian press of that time: "Talzūnas, as attacker, was receiving at least half of the points, which the Lithuanian team was scoring. He is irreplaceable in his activity under the basket. The Italy, Poland, Estonia and Egypt defenders were vainly trying to detain this famous Lithuanian player, who was the best attacker".

== State awards ==
- Knight's Cross of the Order of Vytautas the Great (1937)
