= Eugenijus Nikolskis =

Lithuanian basketball and table tennis player (1917–1992)

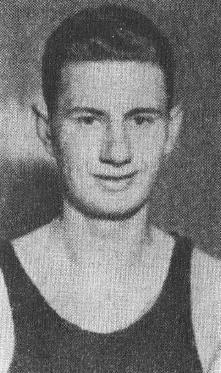
- Eugenijus Nikolskis in 1939

Personal information
- Born: 24 November 1917 Arkhangelsk, Arkhangelsk Governorate, Russian Empire
- Died: 26 October 1992 (aged 74) Moscow, Russia
- Height: 5 ft 11.5 in (1.82 m)
- Weight: 166 lb (75 kg)
Medal record
Men's basketball
Representing Lithuania
FIBA EuroBasket
Gold medal – first place	1937 Riga	Team competition
Gold medal – first place	1939 Kaunas	Team competition

Eugenijus Nikolskis (24 November 1917 – 26 October 1992) was a Lithuanian basketball and table tennis player. He won two gold medals with the Lithuania national basketball team during EuroBasket 1937 and EuroBasket 1939.

== Biography ==
During World War I his parents moved to Russian Empire where Nikolskis was born. In 1922 he returned to Lithuania and attended Kaunas Jėzuitai Gymnasium, which he graduated in 1936. He also served in the Lithuanian Army.

Nikolskis played table tennis and won Lithuania table tennis competition multiple times, been CJSO member. In 1939, in Cairo, he participated in table tennis world championship with Lithuania national team and finished 4th. From 1936 he also played basketball and was invited to Lithuania national basketball team two times. He played for Small forward position and became EuroBasket champion twice in EuroBasket 1937 and EuroBasket 1939.

Nikolskis worked at various Kaunas companies, after World War II he moved to Vilnius and there became "Spartakas" table tennis society coach. From 1953 he lived in Moscow, been Moscow "Spartakas" society head coach.

Nikolskis died in Moscow on 26 October 1992, at the age of 74.

== Sources ==
- Jungtinių Amerikos Valstijų lietuviai. (II t.) – Mokslo ir enciklopedijų leidybos centras, Vilnius, 2002
- Vidas Mačiulis, Vytautas Gudelis. Halė, kurioje žaidė Lubinas ir Sabonis. 1939–1989 – Respublikinis sporto kombinatas, Kaunas, 1989
