= Leopoldas Kepalas =

Lithuanian basketball player (1912–1981)

Personal information
- Born: September 6, 1912 Saint Petersburg, Russian Empire
- Died: 1983 (aged 70–71) Wont, Australia
Medal record
Men's basketball
Representing Lithuania
FIBA EuroBasket
Gold medal – first place	1937 Riga	Team competition

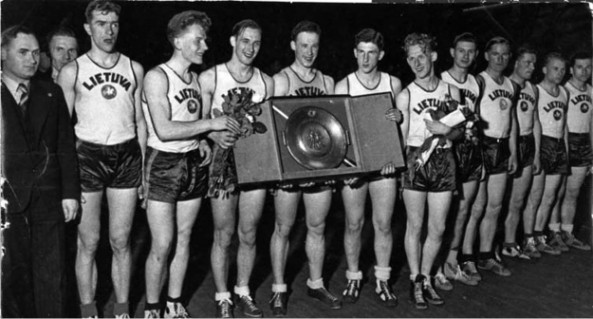
Leopoldas Kepalas (second from the right)

Leopoldas Alfonsas Kepalas (1912–1981) was a Lithuanian basketball player. He won gold medal with the Lithuania men's national basketball team during EuroBasket 1937.

== Biography ==
Kepalas was born in Saint Petersburg, Russian Empire. In 1924, Kepalas with his parents returned to Lithuania. Since 1926 he attended a school in Šiauliai. He played basketball as a part of teams of the Aušra Boys Gymnasium (1928–1931), Kaunas Grandies (1934–1935), Lithuanian Physical Education Union (1935–1940). He became the Lithuanian volleyball (1935) and Lithuanian basketball (1936) champion.

In 1937, Kepalas represented the Lithuania men's national basketball team during the EuroBasket 1937 in Riga, Latvia. He played in two games and scored two points, while the team won their first European champions title.

== State awards ==
- Lithuania: 3rd degree Medal of the Order of Vytautas the Great (1937)
