= Vytautas Lesčinskas =

Lithuanian basketball player (1922–1977)

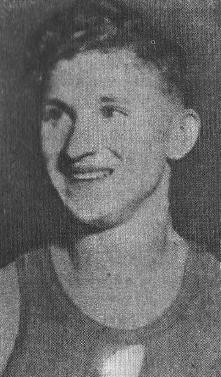
- Vytautas Lesčinskas in 1939

Personal information
- Born: 20 January 1922
- Died: 8 August 1977 (aged 55) Kaunas, Lithuania
- Height: 5 ft 7.5 in (1.71 m)
- Weight: 157 lb (71 kg)
Medal record
Men's basketball
Representing Lithuania
FIBA EuroBasket
Gold medal – first place	1939 Kaunas	Team competition

Vytautas Lesčinskas (20 January 1922 – 8 August 1977) was a Lithuanian basketball player. He won the gold medal with the Lithuania national basketball team during EuroBasket 1939.

Lesčinskas died in Kaunas on 8 August 1977, at the age of 55.

== Sources ==
- Vidas Mačiulis, Vytautas Gudelis. Halė, kurioje žaidė Lubinas ir Sabonis. 1939–1989 – Respublikinis sporto kombinatas, Kaunas, 1989
