= Leonas Milčius =

Lithuanian politician

Leonas Milčius (born 11 December 1942) is a Lithuanian politician. In 1990 he was among those who signed the Act of the Re-Establishment of the State of Lithuania.
