= Stasys Šačkus =

Lithuanian athlete and basketball player

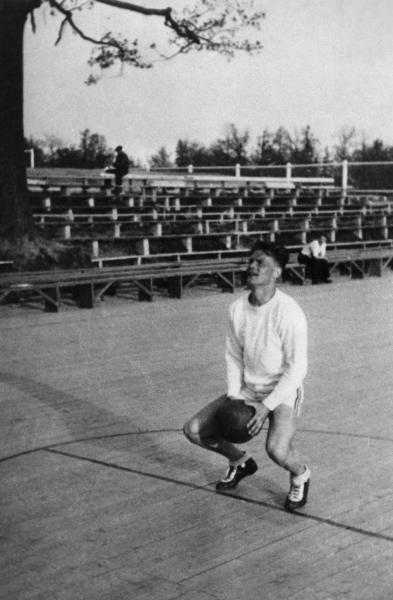
- Stasys Šačkus in 1938

Personal information
- Born: November 20, 1907 Medeliškiai, Sasnava, Marijampolė County, Lithuania
- Died: November 9, 1985 (aged 78) Kaunas, Lithuania
Medal record
Men's basketball
Representing Lithuania
FIBA EuroBasket
Gold medal – first place	1937 Riga	Team competition

Stanislovas "Stasys" Šačkus (November 20, 1907 – November 9, 1985) was a Lithuanian athlete, basketball player and referee, coach.

== Biography ==
Šačkus was born on November 20, 1907 in the village of Medeliškiai, Sasnava in the Marijampolė County, Lithuania. In 1928, he graduated Marijampolė Gymnasium. Later studied humanities studies at Vytautas Magnus University. Stasys actively participated in sport, academic and political life.

In 1934, he graduated Department of Physical Education Academy in Berlin.

During occupation of Lithuania by Nazi Germany, he was member of Lithuanian Activist Front, participated in June Uprising. He was also a member of the Lithuanian Liberty Army. On October 18, 1945, he was exiled to Siberia by Soviet authorities and imprisoned in Vorkuta Gulag. He later returned to Lithuania and worked as sports coach.

== Sporting activities ==
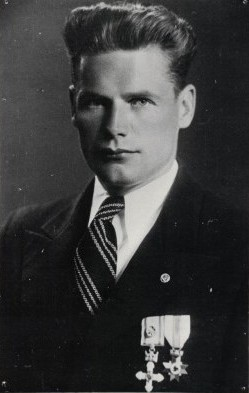
Šačkus decorated with the State Orders of Lithuania in ~1939

During his years in gymnasium, he became one of the best Lithuanian athletes. Before World War II, he accomplished pentathlon, pole vault and 110 meter hurdling records. Šačkus is the most famous for his discus throwing. He is the first to overcome 40 meter point with his 44-meter result.

He participated in various athletics competitions in Berlin, London, New York City, Tallinn, Riga. He was the first Lithuanian sportsman to participate in the first athletics competition - 1934 European Athletics Championships in Turin, Italy.

In addition, Šačkus also was player of the Lithuania men's national basketball team, won EuroBasket gold medals for the first time in Lithuania history during EuroBasket 1937. He also won two gold medals in Lithuanian National Olympic Games. In 1939, he was the first Lithuanian to be awarded international category basketball referee name.

Later he was Republic Basketball Committee chairman, gymnastics federation (LGSF) sports club "Vaidotas" member, LGSF football team manager. He was awarded honored coach of the Lithuanian Soviet Socialist Republic name in 1962.

== State awards ==
- Officer's Cross of the Order of Vytautas the Great (1937)

== References and sources ==
- Vidas Mačiulis, Vytautas Gudelis. Halė, kurioje žaidė Lubinas ir Sabonis. 1939–1989 – Respublikinis sporto kombinatas, Kaunas, 1989
