= Vytautas Norkus =

Lithuanian-born American basketball player

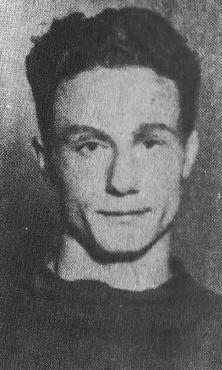
- Vytautas Norkus in 1939

Personal information
- Born: 28 January 1921 Kaunas, Lithuania
- Died: 29 January 2014 (aged 93) Waterbury, Connecticut
- Height: 5 ft 8.5 in (1.74 m)
- Weight: 155 lb (70 kg)
Medal record
Men's basketball
Representing Lithuania
FIBA EuroBasket
Gold medal – first place	1939 Kaunas	Team competition

Vytautas Petras Norkus (28 January 1921 – 29 January 2014) was a Lithuanian-born American basketball player. He won a gold medal with the Lithuania national basketball team during EuroBasket 1939.

== Biography ==
Norkus was born in Kaunas and had a twin brother Algirdas. He studied at the Aušra Boys' Gymnasium. Since 1936 he started playing basketball at the age of 15. He was also interested in tennis, long jump, short-distance running and was a member of Kaunas Grandis athletic club. At Vytautas Magnus University, he studied physical education.

He was invited to join Lithuania national basketball team in 1938 which he participated in EuroBasket 1939. He became EuroBasket champion that year.

At the end of World War II in 1944 he moved to Germany, where he played for Kempten Šarūnas, a basketball team of Lithuanian emigrants. In 1949, he moved to the United States. He settled in Waterbury, Connecticut, where he worked at a bakery and at Uniroyal for 33 years. Norkus continued to participate in sports and was a member of the Knights of Lithuania.

In 2001, a book alleged that Vytautas Norkus and his brother Algirdas were complicit in the execution of Jews in Lithuania in 1941. The brothers denied the allegations, and charges were not filed.

== Sources ==
- Jungtinių Amerikos Valstijų lietuviai. (II t.) – Mokslo ir enciklopedijų leidybos centras, Vilnius, 1998
- Vidas Mačiulis, Vytautas Gudelis. Halė, kurioje žaidė Lubinas ir Sabonis. 1939–1989 – Respublikinis sporto kombinatas, Kaunas, 1989
