= Gvidonas Markevičius =

Lithuanian basketball player

Personal information
- Born: November 22, 1969 (age 56) Šakiai, Lithuania
- Listed height: 6 ft 5 in (1.96 m)
- Listed weight: 181 lb (82 kg)

Career information
- Playing career: 1986–2005
- Position: Shooting guard / point guard

Career history
- 1986–1990: Žalgiris Kaunas
- 1991–1995: Zastal Zielona Góra
- 1995–1996: Atletas Kaunas
- 1996–1997: BC Inter Bratislava
- 1997–1998: BC Alita
- 1999–2005: Schwelmer Baskets
Medals
Men's basketball
Representing Lithuania
EuroBasket
Silver medal – second place	1995 Greece	{{{2}}}

Gvidonas Markevičius (born November 22, 1969) is a Lithuanian retired professional basketball player.

== National team career ==
Markevičius was a member of the Lithuanian national team which won silver medals at the EuroBasket 1995.
