= Juozas Jurgėla =

Lithuanian basketball player (1911–1961)

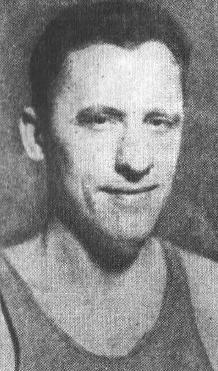
- Juozas Jurgėla in 1939

Personal information
- Born: August 11, 1911 Chicago, Illinois, U.S.
- Died: May 2, 1961 (aged 49)
- Height: 5 ft 9 in (1.75 m)
- Weight: 165 lb (75 kg)
Medal record
Men's basketball
Representing Lithuania
FIBA EuroBasket
Gold medal – first place	1939 Kaunas	Team competition

Juozas Jurgėla with Lithuania national team

Juozas Jurgėla (August 11, 1911 – May 2, 1961) was a Lithuanian basketball player. He won gold medal at EuroBasket 1939 with Lithuania national basketball team.

== Biography ==
Studied in Kaunas, from 1925 played basketball in Kaunas Grandis club. As a member of Grandis club he won third place during the first Lithuania nation Olympics. He was invited to Lithuania national basketball team twice (1937, Riga and 1939, Kaunas). He won gold medal at EuroBasket 1939. Noted for mature and tactical play making.

After the end of the World War II, he moved to Germany, and later to United States. In the United States he supported Lithuanian diaspora sports.

== Sources ==
- United States of America Lithuanians (Jungtinių Amerikos Valstijų lietuviai) – Science and encyclopedia publishing center, Vilnius, 1998
- Vidas Mačiulis, Vytautas Gudelis. Halė, kurioje žaidė Lubinas ir Sabonis. 1939–1989 – Respublikinis sporto kombinatas, Kaunas, 1989
