= Sasnava =

- Town
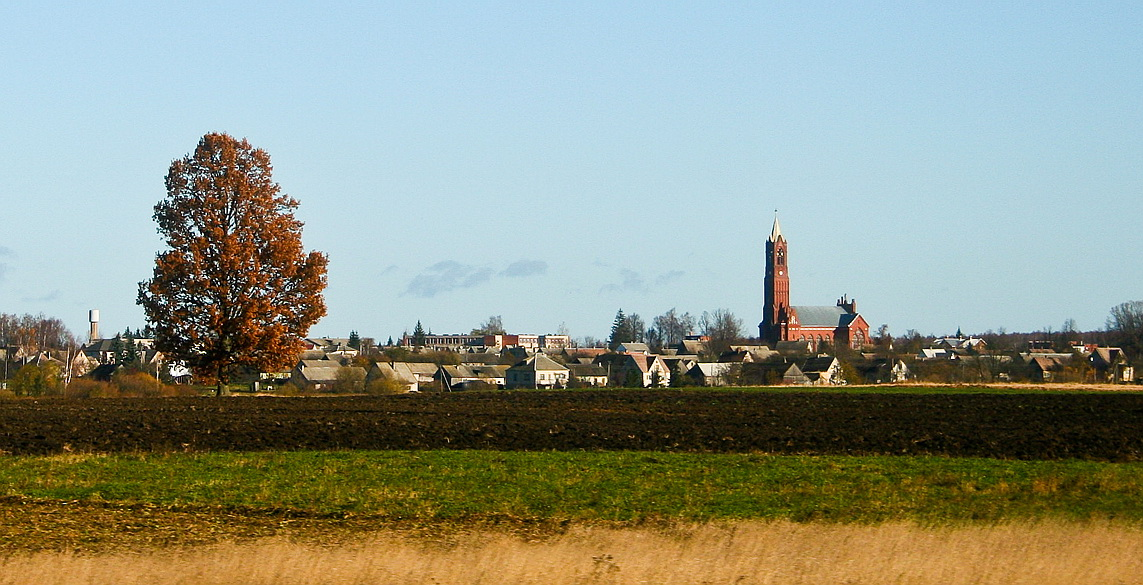

- Coat of arms

- Location within Lithuania
- Coordinates: 54°38′50″N 23°27′40″E
- Country: Lithuania
- County: Marijampolė County

Government
  - Mayor of Marijampolė: Vidmantas Brazys (LSDP)
  - Town elder: Nijolė Smilgienė
  - District commissary: Rimvydas Miliūnas

Population (2011)
  - Total: 546
- Time zone: UTC+2 (EET)
  - Summer (DST): UTC+3 (EEST)

Sasnava is a town in Marijampolė County, in southwestern Lithuania. At the 2011 census, it had a population of 546. It is on the confluence of the Sasna River and its tributary, the Šešupė.

The name of the town comes from the river name Sasnà. The coat of arms of Sasnava was created according to this version. Another version claims that the Sasna stream comes from the Lithuanian word "susna" - which means decayed, withered.
