= Vytautas Kulakauskas =

Lithuanian basketball player, coach, and educator

- Vytautas Kulakauskas

Personal information
- Born: August 25, 1920 Kuršėnai, Lithuania
- Died: December 22, 2000 (aged 80) Vilnius, Lithuania
Medal record
Men's basketball
Representing Soviet Union
European Championships
Gold medal – first place	1947 Czechoslovakia	USSR

Vytautas Kulakauskas (August 25, 1920, in Kuršėnai – December 22, 2000, in Vilnius) was a Lithuanian basketball player, coach, and educator, who competed for the Soviet Union in the EuroBasket 1947 and won a gold medal.

== Biography ==
In 1940, Kulakauskas graduated Kaunas Military School. In 1944–1945, he studied at Vytautas Magnus University's Faculty of Medicine. In 1948, he graduated Lithuanian Sports University.

In 1945–1950, he taught at Lithuanian Sports University. In 1950–1960, he was Head of the Department of Physical Education at Lithuanian University of Educational Sciences, in 1957–1960 he was even the Dean of the Faculty of Music. In 1961–1980, he became a teacher at Vilnius Gediminas Technical University, and from 1964 the Head of the Department of Physical Education. In 1968, he became associate professor.

He also published the book Krepšininko treniruote (English: The basketball player workout), where he included many epitomes regarding training.

== Personal life ==
He had a wife, Elena Kulakauskienė.

== Soviet Union national team ==
In a 1990s interview, Kulakauskas described the Soviet squad by telling: "It could be said that there were the physical preparations and shootings, however all the tactics and the game-play was given to them by us. I remember by preparing for the Olympics in February, in Moscow, we were working on tactics for a month. On tactics exercises without any game-play. Not a single minute. We were working the whole month on techniques and tactics improvement. We gave the whole American school to them, which we received from the Lithuanian Americans".
