= Leonas Petrauskas =

Lithuanian basketball player (1919–1994)

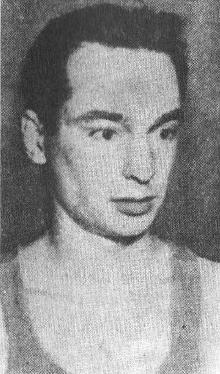
- Leonas Petrauskas in 1939

Personal information
- Born: March 17, 1919 Kaunas, Lithuania
- Died: July 18, 1994 (aged 74–75) Engadine, New South Wales, Australia
- Height: 5 ft 6.5 in (1.69 m)
- Weight: 150 lb (68 kg)
Medal record
Men's basketball
Representing Lithuania
FIBA EuroBasket
Gold medal – first place	1937 Riga	Team competition
Gold medal – first place	1939 Kaunas	Team competition

Leonas Eugenijus Petrauskas (1919 – 18 July 1994) was a Lithuanian basketball player. He won two gold medals with the Lithuania national basketball team during EuroBasket 1937 and EuroBasket 1939.

== Biography ==
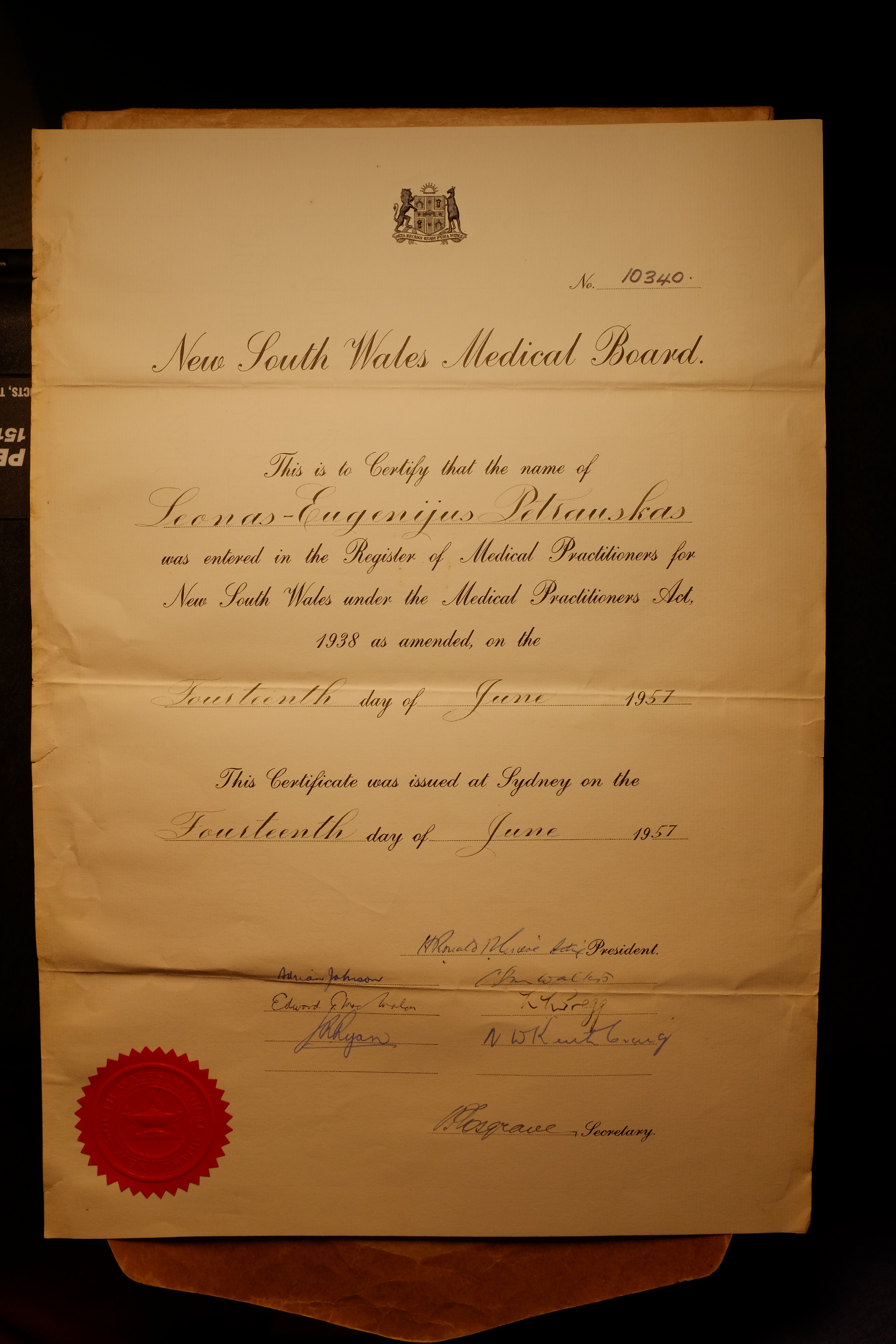
Registration of Dr Leonas Petrauskas by the NSW Medical Board.

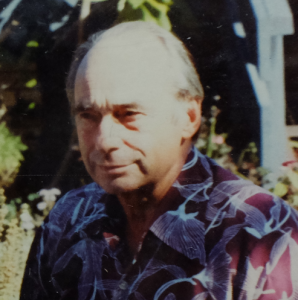
Leonas Petrauskas in later life.

Petrauskas was born in Kaunas, Lithuania on March 17, 1919. Until 1943 he played for a basketball team of the Lithuanian Physical Education Union (LFLS). In 1936, he won the Lithuanian basketball title. In 1937–1939, he represented the Lithuania men's national basketball team, played in three games, scored three points, and won two European titles during the EuroBasket 1937 and EuroBasket 1939.

Facing the upcoming Soviet re-occupation of Lithuania, Petrauskas departed to the West in 1944. In 1949, he arrived in Australia. In Australia he graduated the Institute of Tropical Diseases and Hygiene of the University of Sydney.

Petrauskas worked as a Doctor at the Engadine Medical Group, 1107 Old Prince's Highway (corner of Boronia Avenue), Engadine, NSW, Australia. Engadine Medical Group also had a smaller practice at Heathcote, NSW, Australia.

For more than ten years Petrauskas also lived in New Guinea.
