= Frank Lubin =

Lithuanian-American basketball player

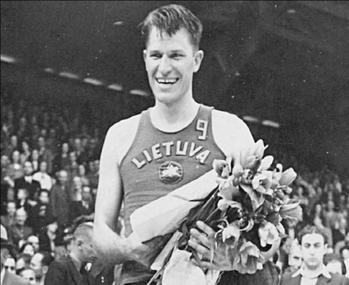
- Frank Lubin during EuroBasket 1939

Personal information
- Born: January 7, 1910 Los Angeles, California, U.S.
- Died: July 8, 1999 (aged 89) Glendale, California, U.S.
- Listed height: 6 ft 7 in (2.01 m)
- Listed weight: 232 lb (105 kg)

Career information
- High school: Lincoln (Los Angeles, California)
- College: UCLA (1928–1931)
- Position: Center
Medals
Men's basketball
Representing the United States
Olympic Games
Gold medal – first place	1936 Berlin	Team competition
Representing Lithuania
FIBA EuroBasket
Gold medal – first place	1939 Kaunas	Team competition

Frank John Lubin (Lithuanian: Pranas Jonas Lubinas; January 7, 1910 – July 8, 1999) was a Lithuanian-American basketball player. He played college basketball for the UCLA Bruins from 1928 to 1931. In 1997, Lubin was inducted into the UCLA Athletics Hall of Fame. He was also inducted into the Helms Sports Hall of Fame.

For his early contributions to the success of basketball in Lithuania, Lubin is nicknamed the 'Godfather of Basketball' in Lithuania.

== Early life ==
Lubin was born on the east side of Los Angeles, California, to a family of Lithuanian immigrants, who were born in Lithuania, and he died in Glendale, California. A veteran with the United States Army Air Forces during World War II, Lubin was buried at Riverside National Cemetery, in Riverside, California. His father, Konstantinas Lubinas, was from Vilkaviškis, while his mother, Paulina Vasiliauskaitė, was from Vabalninkas.

== Basketball career ==
=== High school ===
When Lubin grew up to a height of 6 ft 7 in (2.01 m) at Lincoln High School, classmates encouraged him to try out for the basketball team. Gangly and uncoordinated, Lubin struggled to improve his game, but was eventually named to the All-City Second Team as a senior in 1927.

=== College career ===
While playing college basketball at the University of California, Los Angeles, from 1928 to 1931, Lubin earned All-Pacific Coast Conference honors in his senior season with the Bruins.

=== U.S. national team ===
Following his college career, he worked as a stagehand at Universal Pictures, and joined the studio's AAU team, which earned the right to represent the U.S. as part of the first Olympic basketball tournament in 1936, where he won the gold.

=== Lithuanian national team ===
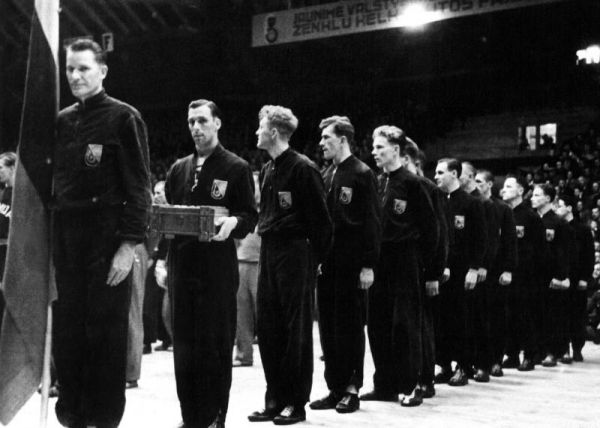
Lubin (first) holding the national flag of Lithuania after winning the EuroBasket 1939

During the 1936 Summer Olympics, Lubin was invited to come to Lithuania, and he became their first national team head coach. During Lubin's first visit to Lithuania his sister-in-law broke her leg while riding to countryside with a wagon, which tipped over, therefore Lubin had to stay with his wife in Lithuania for longer than expected until she recovered and Lubin was asked to train Lithuanian athletes about basketball. They won the EuroBasket title in 1937, using American-born players of Lithuanian heritage. When the team hosted the EuroBasket in 1939, they again won the title, this time with Lubin, acting as a player-coach. Lubin the de facto MVP of EuroBasket 1939, however he was unable to receive the award, because he was taller than 6 ft 3 in (1.91 m), and FIBA had a rule at the time, which prohibited the award to be given to players at such a height. According to the 1939 edition of Lithuanian magazine Trimitas, "The biggest pillar of our team was Lubinas, 2-3 away players would run around him and protect him as best they could. However, Lubinas, being covered by the away players, did not try to shoot the ball himself, but knew how to pass the ball well to his teammates, who made the most of the opportunities." Lubinas intended to settle in the land of his father in the surroundings of Lukšiai in Lithuania and dreamed of leading Lithuania at the 1940 Summer Olympics. According to Lubin, he established American-style basketball in Lithuania.

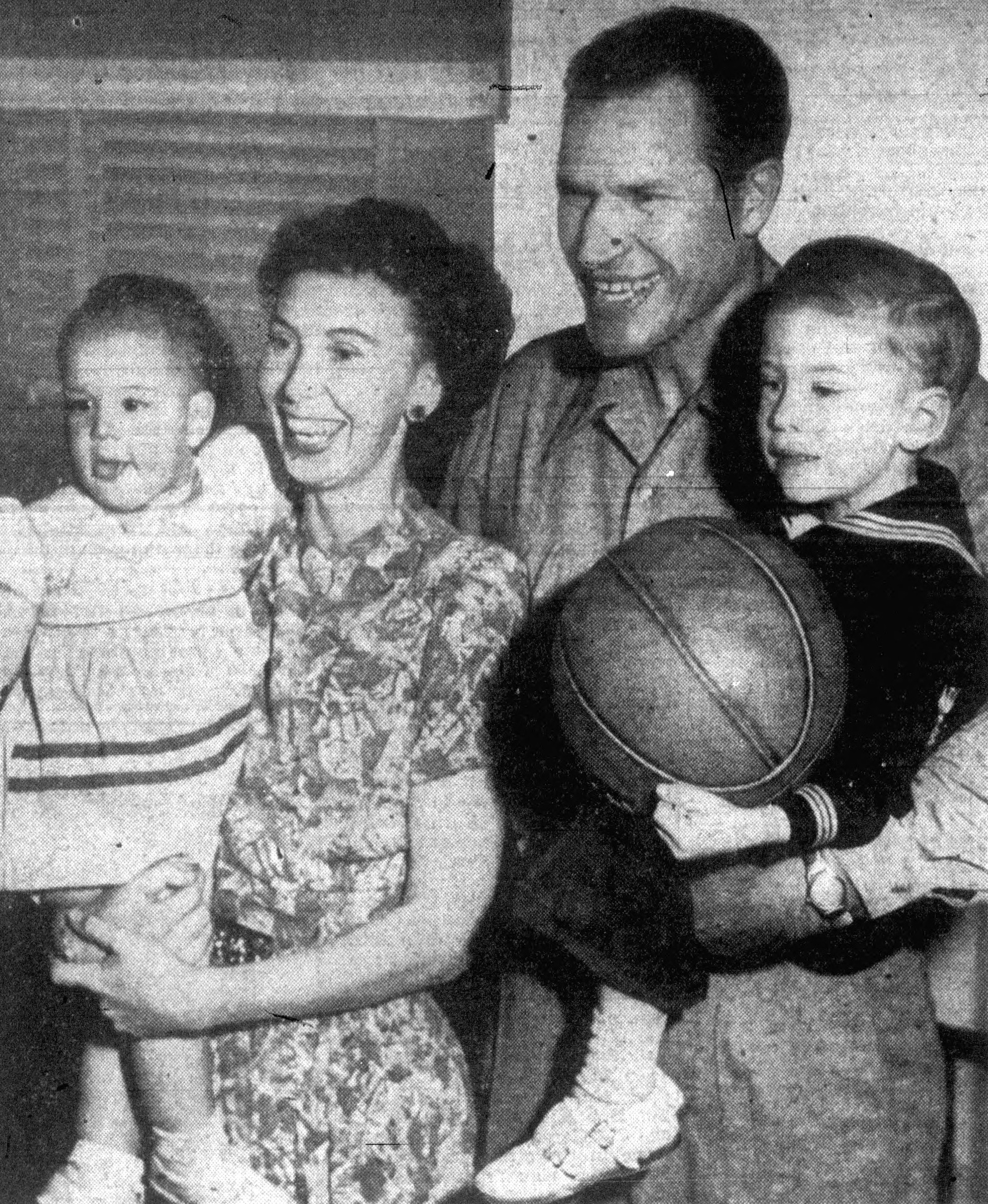
Lubin with his wife, daughter and son in 1951

When World War II broke out in 1939, Lubin was in Italy, coaching a Lithuanian women's team. Given that Nazi Germany was directly on the path back to Lithuania, Italian officials had to help the team to get back, through train and boat, avoiding Germany. Afterwards, Lubin fled Lithuania to California with his family, in the face of the upcoming Soviet invasion that happened one year later. Lubin continued to play for the 20th Century Fox team until 1955, when knee problems prompted him to retire. For his contributions and for introducing the now basketball-mad country of Lithuania to the sport, Lubin is often called the "grandfather of Lithuanian basketball".

Despite being an international basketball star of his era, Lubin never made any money off basketball. However, Lubin was offered a $7,000 contract ($2,000 less than he was at the time making at the 20th Century Studios) by the Minneapolis Lakers.

In a 1989 interview Lubin narrated that "when after the war the Russian squad almost defeated USA, some were congratulating me, others were reproachful as they never heard that the Russians were playing basketball. After the war they were using these Lithuanians who I once trained. They took over many techniques and tactics knowledges. I was always observing from far when basketball traditions blossomed in Lithuania and gave such international stars like Arvydas Sabonis. I was proud that the Lithuanians shined more than the others in Seoul. It was mine team. Lithuanian team defeated the Americans, I was telling to the media..."

In a 1992 interview Lubin said that he was "filled with pride" when he saw Lithuania competing again as an independent country at the 1992 Summer Olympics.

== See also ==
- List of FIBA EuroBasket winning head coaches
