= Artūras Andrulis =

Lithuanian basketball player and soldier (1922–1981)

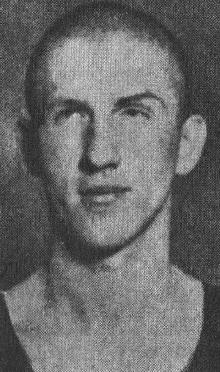
- Artūras Andrulis in 1939

Personal information
- Born: April 10, 1922
- Died: July 3, 1981 (aged 59) Volusia County, Florida
- Height: 5 ft 11.2 in (1.81 m)
- Weight: 175 lb (79 kg)
Medal record
Men's basketball
Representing Lithuania
FIBA EuroBasket
Gold medal – first place	1937 Riga	Team competition
Gold medal – first place	1939 Kaunas	Team competition

Artūras Andrulis (Americanized his name as Adolfas Andrulis; April 10, 1922 – July 3, 1981) was a soldier and Lithuanian basketball player. He won two gold medals with the Lithuania national basketball team during EuroBasket 1937 and EuroBasket 1939.

== Biography ==
Andrulis studied at Aušra Gymasnium and started playing basketball when he was 17 years old. He studied at Kaunas War School and played in their team. He was notable for fast defense. Later he was invited to Lithuania men's national basketball team and played as a shooting guard. He won EuroBasket 1937 and EuroBasket 1939.

At the end of World War II in 1944 he moved to Germany and played for the Kempton Šarūnas, a Lithuanian emigrants' team. In 1950, he moved to the United States and played for a Lithuanian athletes' club.

== State awards ==
- Lithuania: Medal of the Order of Vytautas the Great (1937)
