= Lithuanian Sports University =

University in Kaunas, Lithuania

Coordinates: 54°53′54″N 23°56′04″E

Lithuanian Sports University or LSU is a university in Kaunas, Lithuania, specializing in sports, physical activities, and physiology. It is headquartered in Žaliakalnis neighbourhood, in close proximity to the Kaunas Sports Hall and the S. Darius and S. Girėnas Stadium.

== Nauris ==
Physical Culture Palace in 1938

LSU traces its origins back to 1934 when the President of Lithuania, Antanas Smetona, established the Higher Courses of Physical Education or HCPE (Lithuanian: Aukštieji kūno kultūros kursai) nauris offering a higher education degree. The HCPE were founded with the idea of combining the subjects of physical exercises and military training so that the graduates would be able to teach these subjects in gymnasiums. In 1938, HCPE were closed and their function was taken over by the Department of Physical Education established at Vytautas Magnus University.

In 1945, the Lithuanian State Institute of Physical Education was founded as an independent institution. It was located in the former palace of Physical Education Base and has got the main stadium with couple of football pitches, sports hall, tennis and basketball courts. In the first year, 100 students were enrolled at the Institute. In 1999, the Institute was renamed the Lithuanian Academy of Physical Education (Lithuanian: Lietuvos kūno kultūros akademija or LKKA) by a resolution of the Parliament of Lithuania (Seimas).

Since its foundation, the University has educated approximately 16,000 physical education teachers, as well as sports coaches, physical therapy specialists, and tourism and sports managers. Many scholars, coaches, and public figures have graduated from the University. Its graduates include champions and medalists at the Olympic Games, World Championships, and European Championships, among them two-time European boxing champion Algirdas Šocikas, Olympic gold medalist and world basketball champion Modestas Paulauskas, the winners of the Olympic gold medals Valdemaras Chomičius, Rimas Kurtinaitis, and Virgilijus Alekna.

In 2012, the Parliament of Lithuania including Education, Science and Culture Committee unanimously approved that the name of Lithuanian Academy of Physical Education is changed to The Lithuanian Sports University. 2014 the University celebrated its 80th anniversary.

== University structure ==
The University consists of 2 faculties:

- Faculty of Sport Biomedicine
- Faculty of Sport Education

4 departments

- Department of Applied Biology and Rehabilitation
- Department of Coaching Science
- Department of Health, Physical and Social Education
- Department of Sport Management, Economics and Sociology

2 institutes

- Institute of Sport Science and Innovations
- National Wellness Institute

4 centers

- Career and Competence Development Centre
- Sports and Leisure Centre
- European Basketball Research Centre

== Studies ==
The University offers 20 study programmes: eight undergraduate programmes at Bachelor level (including three international programmes in English), ten Master and two Doctoral study programmes. Several sports clubs are set up at the university, including football club LKKA ir Teledema Kaunas, basketball club Viktorija and LSU-Baltai, handball, weightlifting, volleyball, and other clubs.

Undergraduate (Bachelor's degree) studies:

- European Bachelor in Physical Activity and Lifestyle
- Sports Coaching
- Physiotherapy

Graduate (Master's degree) studies:

- Physiotherapy
- International Master in Performance Analysis of Sport
- Tourism and Sports Management
- Master of Science in International Basketball Coaching and Management
- Physical Activity and Public Health

Doctoral (PhD degree) studies:

- Biomedical Sciences: Biology
- Social Sciences: Education

The LSU has academic exchange agreements with over 80 European universities and holds active memberships in 14 international organisations and networks. Every year the university sends and receives increasing numbers of students and teachers through in the framework of such academic mobility programmes as Erasmus+ and Nordplus.

== Science ==
University's Laboratories constantly tests Lithuanian athletes and provides scientifically based recommendations, in order to improve their workout process. Research and experimental development activities are carried out in four departments of the University, in Sports Science and Innovations Institute and also, in The European research center of basketball. Lithuanian Sports University constantly creating and providing study programmes for all three cycles as well as continuous education programmes based on the latest research and technologies.

Organization and administration of scientific activities, research planning, execution and reporting are determined by the Regulations of Scientific Activities of Lithuanian Sports University.

LSU Strategic areas of research:

- Exercise Physiology and Genetics
- Brain and Skeletal Muscles
- Health Enhancing Physical Activity and Education through Sport
- Management and Economics of Sports Industry
- Methodology of Sports and Exercise Training

In all aspects of the research process and preparation of scientist, University cooperating not only with Lithuanian, but also with European Universities and scientists, including University of Worcester, University of Aberdeen and Karolinska Institutet.

The university publishes three scientific journals:

- "Baltic Journal of Sport and Health Sciences" ISSN 2351-6496
- "Reabilitacijos mokslai" ("Rehabilitation Sciences") ISSN 2029-3194
- Online journal "Laisvalaikio tyrimai" ("Leisure Time Research") ISSN 2345-0339

== Sports ==
Almost all sports included into the programme of Olympic Games are trained at the Lithuanian Sports University.

LSU available sports:

- Basketball
- Football
- Handball
- Volleyball
- Track-and-field athletics
- Swimming
- Sport aerobics
- Judo
- Boxing
- Rugby
- Kayak and canoeing
- Sailing
- Cycling
- Orienteering
- Dancing
- Wheelchair basketball team

LSU is an important centre of sports science, the fosterer of physical education, sport values and traditions. LSU has gained respect in a wide range of sports games in different Lithuanian championships. Basketball players have become winners in numerous Lithuanian championships as well as handballers, volleyballers, footballers are also famous for their sports results.

== Alumni ==
- Virgilijus Alekna, Olympic discus throwing champion
- Valdemaras Chomičius, Olympic basketball champion
- Rimas Kurtinaitis, Olympic basketball champion
- Justinas Lagunavičius, Olympic silver medalist in basketball
- Modestas Paulauskas, Olympic basketball champion
- Gintarė Scheidt, Olympic silver medalist in sailing
- Birutė Šakickienė, Olympic bronze medalist in rowing
- Algirdas Šocikas, European boxing champion
- Stanislovas Stonkus, Olympic silver medalist in basketball
