= Juozas Žukas =

Lithuanian basketball and tennis player (1915–1981)

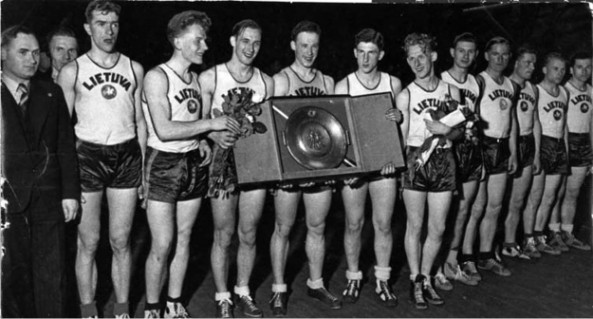
- Juozas Žukas (sixth from the right)

Personal information
- Born: Joseph J. Zukas; October 29, 1915 Chicago, Illinois
- Died: July 7, 1981 (aged 65) Tucson, Arizona
Medal record
Men's basketball
Representing Lithuania
FIBA EuroBasket
Gold medal – first place	1937 Riga	Team competition

Jonas Juozas Žukas (October 29, 1915 in Chicago, Illinois - July 7, 1981) was a Lithuanian basketball and tennis player.

== Biography ==
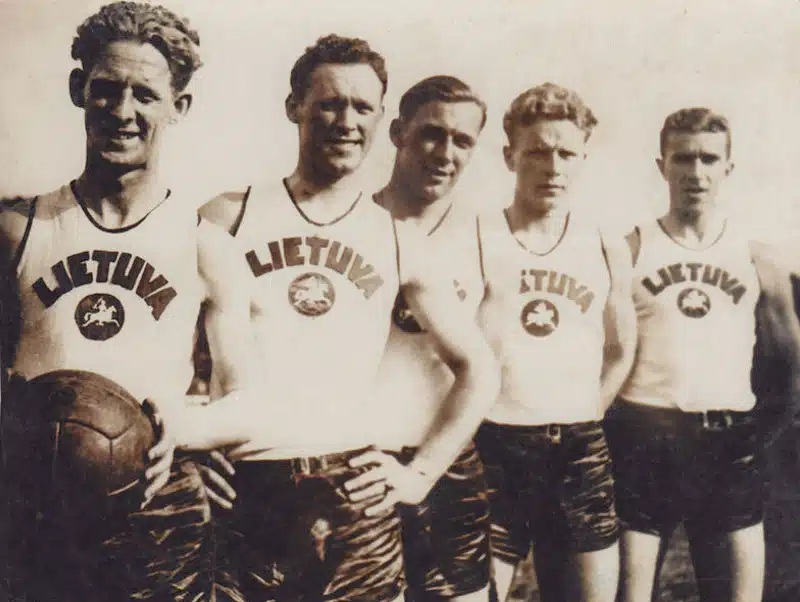
Žukas (first from the left) with the 1937 Lithuania men's national team teammates

Žukas lived in northern Chicago, near Ogden Park, and was known as Joseph "Joe" Zukas. His first visit to Lithuania was in 1930, where he worked as a sports instructor in the physical culture department in Kaunas. He would later be part of a delegation of Lithuanian American athletes from Chicago that went to the 1935 World Lithuanian Congress in Kaunas, and stayed there teaching tennis and being a part of the national basketball team. He played basketball for CJSO Kaunas.

In 1939, he returned to the United States, and lived in Tucson, Arizona, where he died on July 7, 1981.

He won a gold medal with the Lithuania men's national basketball team during the EuroBasket 1937 in Riga, Latvia.

== State awards ==
- Knight's Cross of the Order of Vytautas the Great (1937)
