= Pranas Mažeika =

Lithuanian basketball player (1917–2007)

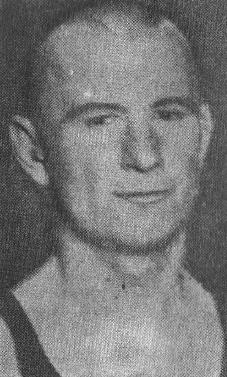
- Pranas Mažeika in 1939

Personal information
- Born: August 15, 1917 Beloretsk, Russian Empire
- Died: 13 April 2007 (aged 89) Modesto, California, United States
- Height: 6 ft 0 in (1.83 m)
- Weight: 175 lb (79 kg)
Medal record
Men's basketball
Representing Lithuania
FIBA EuroBasket
Gold medal – first place	1937 Riga	Team competition
Gold medal – first place	1939 Kaunas	Team competition

Pranas "Frank" Mažeika (August 15, 1917 – April 13, 2007 in the United States) was a Lithuanian physician and basketball player. He won two gold medals with the Lithuania national basketball team during EuroBasket 1937 and EuroBasket 1939.

== Biography ==
Pranas Mažeika was born in Beloretsk, Russian Empire to Lithuanians, Antanas Mažeika and Honorata Mažeika. He received his medical degree in Lithuania in 1943. Together with his wife and son, he departed from Lithuania in 1944 and later emigrated to the United States in 1949. He worked at Wabash Hospital in Moberly, Missouri, from 1952 to 1953, and then he practiced medicine in Lake Zurich, Illinois for over four decades.

== State awards ==
- Lithuania: 3rd degree Medal of the Order of Vytautas the Great (1937)
