= Feliksas Kriaučiūnas =

Lithuanian American basketball player and coach

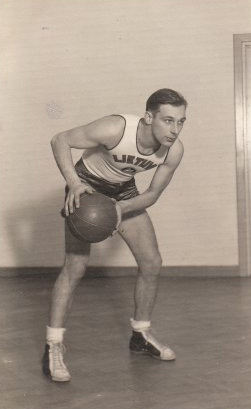
- Feliksas Kriaučiūnas in 1938

Personal information
- Born: August 18, 1911 Chicago, Illinois, U.S.
- Died: October 28, 1977 (aged 66) Chicago, Illinois, U.S.
- Listed height: 5 ft 11.4 in (1.81 m)
- Listed weight: 178 lb (81 kg)

Career information
- College: Notre Dame; DePaul
Medals
Representing Lithuania
Men's basketball
FIBA EuroBasket
Gold medal – first place	1937 Riga	Team competition
Gold medal – first place	1939 Kaunas	Team competition
Women's basketball
Silver medal – second place	1938 Rome	Team competition

Feliksas Kriaučiūnas (Americanized his name as Phil Krause; August 18, 1911 – October 28, 1977) was a Lithuanian American basketball player and coach. He won two gold medals with Lithuania national basketball team and silver medal with Lithuania women's national basketball team.

== Biography ==
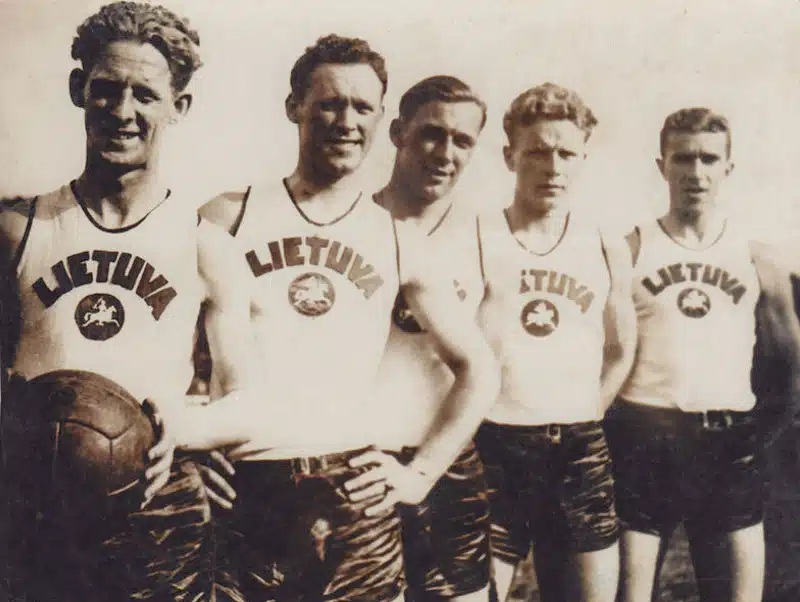
Kriaučiūnas (in the middle) with the 1937 Lithuania men's national team teammates

Feliksas studied and played for University of Notre Dame team, along with his brother Moose Krause. Later he moved to DePaul University and played for their university team. In 1935, along with other Lithuanian Americans, he started teaching Lithuanians how to play basketball. He was the Lithuania men's national basketball team player-coach and team captain during EuroBasket 1937 and EuroBasket 1939. As soon as World War II begun in 1939, Kriaučiūnas and his brother traveled back to the United States. Kriaučiūnas played a total of 19 games, scoring 65 points. He also was the head coach of the Lithuania women's national basketball team during the first ever women's EuroBasket in 1938 where Lithuania won silver medals. He also firmly contributed in developing nowadays basketball in Lithuania.

== State awards ==
- Officer's Cross of the Order of Vytautas the Great (1937)

== See also ==
- List of FIBA EuroBasket winning head coaches
