= Justinas Lagunavičius =

Lithuanian basketball player (1924–1997)

Personal information
- Born: 4 September 1924 Kaunas, Lithuania
- Died: 15 July 1997 (aged 72) Kaunas, Lithuania
Medal record
Men's basketball
Representing Soviet Union
Olympic Games
| Silver medal – second place | 1952 Helsinki | USSR |
European Championships
| Gold medal – first place | 1947 Czechoslovakia | USSR |
| Gold medal – first place | 1951 France | USSR |
| Gold medal – first place | 1953 USSR | USSR |

Justinas Lagunavičius (4 September 1924 – 15 July 1997) was a Lithuanian basketball player who competed for the Soviet Union in the 1952 Summer Olympics. He trained at VSS Žalgiris in Kaunas.

He was a member of the Soviet team, which won the Olympic silver medal in 1952. He played five matches. Following his retirement as basketball player, he lectured at the Lithuanian Sports University for almost 50 years and in 1967–1989 was the Dean of the Pedagogical Faculty.

== State awards ==
- Lithuania: Recipient of the Knight's Cross of the Order of the Lithuanian Grand Duke Gediminas (1995)
