= Leonas Baltrūnas =

Lithuanian basketball player and coach

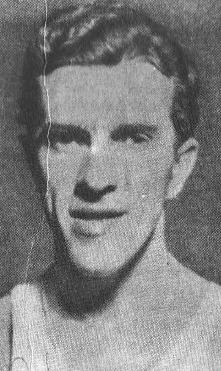
- Leonas Baltrūnas in 1939

Personal information
- Born: 20 October 1914 Riga, Governorate of Livonia, Russian Empire
- Died: 20 April 1993 (aged 78) Melbourne, Victoria, Australia
- Height: 6 ft 2 in (1.88 m)
- Weight: 195 lb (88 kg)
Medal record
Men's basketball
Representing Lithuania
FIBA EuroBasket
Gold medal – first place	1937 Riga	Team competition
Gold medal – first place	1939 Kaunas	Team competition

Leonas Baltrūnas (20 October 1914 – 20 April 1993) was a Lithuanian basketball player and coach. He won two gold medals with Lithuania national basketball team during EuroBasket 1937 and EuroBasket 1939.

== Biography ==
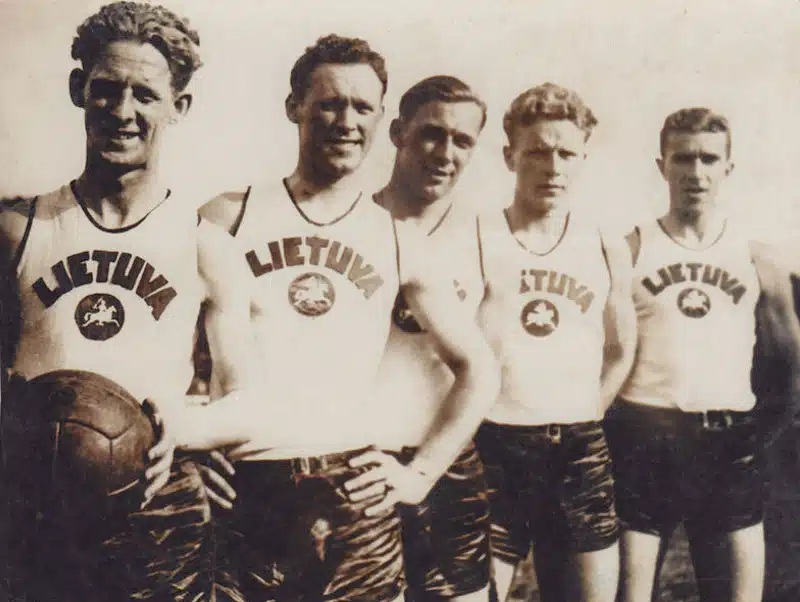
Baltrūnas (first from the right) with Lithuania's team in 1937

In 1937 he graduated Kaunas Highs physical education courses, taught in Higher Technical School. Baltrūnas became interested in basketball in 1935 when he met with the basketball coach from the U.S. Konstantinas Savickas. He was member of Lithuania national basketball team (1936–1940) and participated in two EuroBaskets: EuroBasket 1937 and EuroBasket 1939. He won two gold medals during both competitions. In 1944 he fled to Germany, in 1949 he settled in Australia. In 1950 he organized Lithuanians basketball championship in Melbourne for the first time, established Lithuanians sports club "Varpas" and was physical education chairman. In 1949-1953 he was Victoria state and in 1955 Australia national basketball team coach, later he worked as physical education teacher at Swinburne Technical School in Hawthorn, Victoria. He also firmly contributed in popularizing volleyball in Victoria state.

Leonas Baltrūnas once said:

"I have dedicated the most of my life for the Lithuanian sports and deep in the heart I am proud of it because it is hardly believable that our small Lithuania was advertised with the capital letters in the biggest states capitals. Just because of the sport, the first daily newspapers pages were announcing: LIETUVA – LITAUEN – LITHUANIA – LITVA. It becomes warm, well and pleasant when I return there in my memory. Not only the trainings, games, tournaments and various competitions where I played, but I also remember these countless hours spent in courses, meetings, camps and the long journeys. By preparing coaches and referees I had to ride throughout our beautiful land."

Sport journalist Antanas Laukaitis describing him wrote:

"In Lithuania's, emigrants and in our Lithuanian Australian sport life Leonas Baltrūnas name is just legendary. He – free Lithuania double European champion, he – teacher, preceptor, sporting youth ideal, he – Čiurlionis Ensemble administrator at the flowering time in Germany, he – the founder of the Lithuanian Australian sport, Melbourne Song Gathering organizer, press associate. More can be told about him because it is the human full of the endless energy in sport and in the living activities. In his initiative the first Lithuanian Australian Sport Games were organized in 1950 and it is still continued nowadays, bringing together our sporty Lithuanian youth..."

== State awards ==
- Lithuania: 1st degree Medal of the Order of Vytautas the Great (1937)
