= EuroBasket 1937 =

International basketball event

- Poster promoting EuroBasket 1937

Tournament details
- Host country: Latvia
- City: Riga
- Dates: 2–7 May
- Teams: 8
- Venue: 1 (in 1 host city)

Final positions
- Champions: Lithuania (1st title)
- Runners-up: Italy
- Third place: France
- Fourth place: Poland

Tournament statistics
- Games played: 20
- MVP: (Lithuania) Pranas Talzūnas
- Top scorer: (Latvia) Rūdolfs Jurciņš (12.5 points per game)

The 1937 FIBA European Championship, commonly called FIBA EuroBasket 1937, was the second FIBA EuroBasket regional basketball championship, held by FIBA. Eight national teams affiliated with the International Basketball Federation (FIBA) took part in the competition. Defending champions Latvia hosted the tournament, held in Riga.

== Results ==
=== First round ===
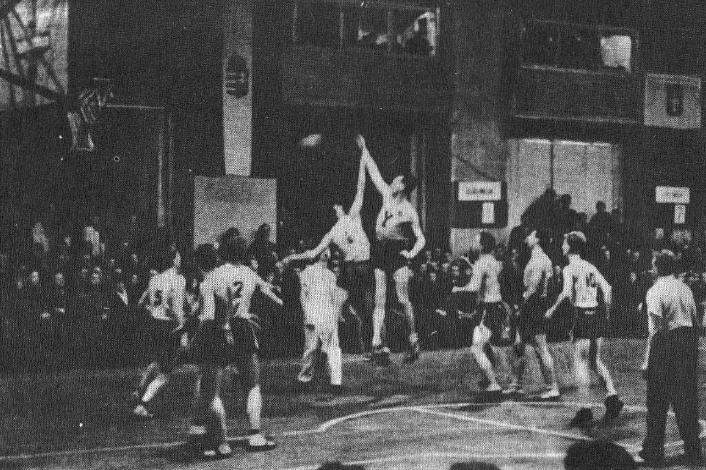
Game between Lithuania and Estonia.

The preliminary round consisted of the eight teams being separated into two groups of four. Each group played a round-robin format tournament, with the top two teams in each group advancing to the semifinals and the bottom two playing in the lower classification matches. Wins counted for 2 points, losses for 1 point.

==== Group A ====
Pos	Team	Pld	W	L	PF	PA	PD	Pts	Qualification
1	Lithuania	3	3	0	63	42	+21	6	Semifinal
2	Italy	3	2	1	52	42	+10	5	Semifinal
3	Estonia	3	1	2	79	65	+14	4	Classification 5–8
4	Egypt	3	0	3	22	67	−45	3	Classification 5–8

Source: fibaeurope.com

Lithuania	22–20	Italy

Estonia	44–15	Egypt

Lithuania	20–15	Estonia

Egypt	0–2 (null and void)	Italy

Lithuania	21–7	Egypt

Italy	30–20	Estonia

Note: Egypt originally won against Italy 31–28, but due to a referee's error, FIBA declared the game null and void, and ordered a replay. Egypt objected to the ruling and did not appear for the replay before withdrawing from the tournament.

==== Group B ====
Pos	Team	Pld	W	L	PF	PA	PD	Pts	Qualification
1	France	3	2	1	78	69	+9	5	Semifinal
2	Poland	3	2	1	84	73	+11	5	Semifinal
3	Latvia	3	2	1	95	66	+29	5	Classification 5–8
4	Czechoslovakia	3	0	3	49	98	−49	3	Classification 5–8

Source: fibaeurope.com

France	29–24	Poland

Latvia	44–11	Czechoslovakia

Poland	32–25	Latvia

France	26–19	Czechoslovakia

Poland	28–19	Czechoslovakia

Latvia	26–23	France

Latvia are classified third, because of scores differences between France-Poland-Latvia (Latvia has −4, Poland +2 and France +2).

=== Classification 5–8 ===
The bottom four teams from the preliminary group faced off in the classification matches.

==== Classification semifinals ====
Estonia	30–20	Czechoslovakia

Latvia	2–0 (Awarded)	Egypt

==== 7th/8th playoff ====
Czechoslovakia	2–0 (Awarded)	Egypt

==== 5th/6th playoff ====
Estonia	41–19	Latvia

=== Semifinals ===
The semifinals pitted the four top teams of the preliminary round against each other. Winners advanced to the final, with the losers playing in a match for 3rd and 4th place.

Lithuania	31–25	Poland

Italy	36–32	France

=== Bronze medal match ===
France	27–24	Poland

=== Final ===
Lithuania	24–23	Italy

1937 FIBA EuroBasket champions

Lithuania
1st title

== Final standings ==
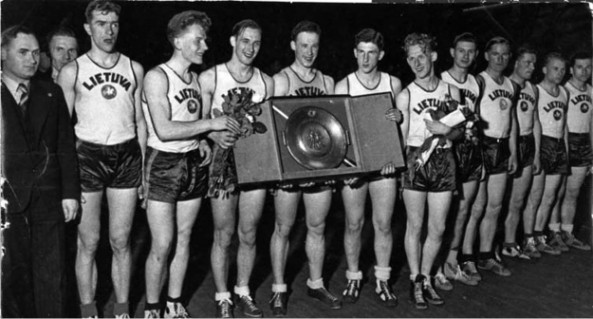
Lithuania national team, winners of the competition, holding the Latvian presidential prize.

Rank	Team	Pld	W	L	PF	PA	PD	Pts
1st place, gold medalist(s)	Lithuania	5	5	0	118	90	+28	10
2nd place, silver medalist(s)	Italy	5	3	2	109	98	+11	8
3rd place, bronze medalist(s)	France	5	3	2	132	129	+3	8
4.	Poland	5	2	3	133	129	+4	7
5.	Estonia	5	3	2	150	104	+46	8
6.	Latvia	5	3	2	114	104	+10	8
7.	Czechoslovakia	5	1	4	69	128	−59	6
8.	Egypt	5	0	5	22	65	−43	5

== Team rosters ==
1. Lithuania: Feliksas Kriaučiūnas, Pranas Talzūnas, Stasys Šačkus, Juozas Žukas, Leonas Baltrūnas, Zenonas Puzinauskas, Artūras Andrulis, Leopoldas Kepalas, Pranas Mažeika, Česlovas Daukša, Leonas Petrauskas, Eugenijus Nikolskis (Coach: Feliksas Kriaučiūnas)

2. Italy: Livio Franceschini, Ambrogio Bessi, Galeazzo Dondi, Emilio Giassetti, Giancarlo Marinelli, Camillo Marinone, Sergio Paganella, Mino Pasquini, Michele Pelliccia, Ezio Varisco

3. France: Pierre Boel, Robert Cohu, Jacques Flouret, Henri Hell, Edmond Leclere, Henri Lesmayoux, Fernand Prudhomme, Etienne Roland, Eugene Ronner, Marcel Vérot (Coach: Henri Kretzschmar)

4. Poland: Pawel Stok, Michal Czajczyk, Stefan Gendera, Florian Grzechowiak, Zdzislaw Kasprzak, Janusz Patrzykont, Andrzej Plucinski, Zbigniew Resich, Zenon Rozycki, Jaroslaw Smigielski (Coach: Walenty Kłyszejko)

5. Estonia: Heino Veskila, Oskar Erikson, Evald Mahl, Vladimir Kärk, Robert Keres, Aleksander Illi, Alfred Zimmermann, Albert Suurna, Ralf Viksten (Coach: Herbert Niiler)
