= Major achievements in gymnastics by nation =

These are four lists of achievements in major international gymnastics events according to first-place, second-place and third-place results obtained by gymnasts representing different nations. The objective is not to create combined medal tables; the focus is on listing the best positions achieved by gymnasts in major international competitions, ranking the nations according to the most number of podiums accomplished by gymnasts of these nations. All seven competitive disciplines currently recognized by the International Gymnastics Federation (FIG) are covered: 1) acrobatic gymnastics, 2) aerobic gymnastics, 3) men's artistic gymnastics, 4) women's artistic gymnastics, 5) women's rhythmic gymnastics, 6) trampoline and tumbling, and 7) parkour.

== Results ==
=== From major senior events ===
For the making of the list, results from four major senior-level international competitions were consulted, as follows: 1) the Olympic Games; 2) the different editions of the World Gymnastics Championships, organized by FIG for each of the gymnastics disciplines; 3) the different stages of the FIG World Cup, as well as the events that preceded it – the IFSA World Cup and the FIT World Cup; and 4) the World Games, in which gymnastics disciplines that are not yet part of the Olympic Games are contested. According to the 2018 Technical Regulations established by the FIG, as well as the statutes of the organization, these are all considered official FIG competitions. FIG also considers the defunct Four Continents Championships as an official competition, but since the tournament excluded nations from Europe, results have not been included. The Olympic Games, the World Championships, the FIG World Cup and the World Games are the only senior international competitions currently listed on individual profiles at the official FIG database, what indicates their high level of importance. Competitions that are not official FIG events, such as the Rhythmic Gymnastics Grand Prix, or the gymnastics events at the Universiade and Goodwill Games, were not considered for the creation of this list.

The conventions used on this table are AC for Acrobatic Gymnastics, AE for Aerobic Gymnastics, MA for Men's Artistic Gymnastics, WA for Women's Artistic Gymnastics, PK for Parkour, RG for Rhythmic Gymnastics, TT for Trampoline and Tumbling.

The table is pre-sorted by total number of first-place results, second-place results and third-place results, respectively. When equal ranks are given, nations are listed in alphabetical order.

Best international results by nation (1896 – November 2026)
		Olympic Games				World Championships							World Cup / World Challenge Cup							World Games					Number of			
Rk.	Nation	MA	WA	RG	TT	AC	AE	MA	WA	PK	RG	TT	AC	AE	MA	WA	PK	RG	TT	AC	AE	PK	RG	TT	1st place, gold medalist(s)	2nd place, silver medalist(s)	3rd place, bronze medalist(s)	Total
1	Ukraine	Gold medal	Gold medal	Gold medal	Gold medal	Gold medal	Gold medal	Gold medal	Gold medal	Gold medal	Gold medal	Gold medal								Gold Medal	Bronze medal	Gold Medal	Gold Medal	Gold Medal	22	0	1	23
2	China	Gold medal	Gold medal	Gold medal	Gold medal	Gold medal	Gold medal	Gold medal	Gold medal	Gold medal	Gold medal	Gold medal								Gold Medal	Gold Medal	Gold Medal		Gold Medal	22	0	0	22
2	Russia	Gold medal	Gold medal	Gold medal	Gold medal	Gold medal	Gold medal	Gold medal	Gold medal		Gold medal	Gold medal								Gold Medal	Gold Medal		Gold Medal	Gold Medal	21	0	0	21
4	Spain	Gold medal	Bronze medal	Gold medal		Silver medal	Gold medal	Gold medal	Gold medal	Silver medal	Gold medal	Gold medal								Gold Medal	Gold Medal			Gold Medal	16	3	1	20
5	France	Gold medal	Gold medal			Gold medal	Gold medal	Gold medal	Silver medal	Bronze medal	Bronze medal	Gold medal								Bronze medal	Gold Medal	Silver medal		Gold Medal	15	2	3	20
6	Bulgaria	Gold medal	Bronze medal	Gold medal		Gold medal	Gold medal	Gold medal	Gold medal		Gold medal	Gold medal								Gold Medal	Gold Medal		Gold Medal	Gold Medal	17	1	1	19
7	Germany (Note: Following official records, medals earned by West Germany (FRG), East Germany (GDR), the United Team of Germany (EUA) at the 1956, 1960 and 1964 Olympic Games, and Germany (GER) are counted separately.)	Gold medal	Gold medal	Gold medal	Gold medal	Silver medal		Gold medal	Gold medal		Gold medal	Gold medal								Gold Medal				Gold Medal	14	3	1	18
8	Japan	Gold medal	Bronze medal				Gold medal	Gold medal	Gold medal	Silver medal	Gold medal	Gold medal									Gold Medal	Gold Medal		Gold Medal	15	1	1	17
9	Italy	Gold medal	Gold medal	Silver medal			Gold medal	Gold medal	Gold medal	Silver medal	Gold medal										Gold Medal	Silver medal	Gold medal		14	3	0	17
10	(United Kingdom) Great Britain (Note: The official report of the 1965 Trampoline World Championships lists bronze medalist in men's tumbling Peter Davies as an athlete representing Wales (WAL). However, the official records from the International Gymnastics Federation state that Davies represented Great Britain (GBR). Similarly, official results at the time suggest that some athletes represented England, while official records from the International Gymnastics Federation indicate that these athletes represented Great Britain.)	Gold medal	Bronze medal		Gold medal	Gold medal		Gold medal	Gold medal			Gold medal								Gold Medal	Bronze medal	Bronze medal		Gold Medal	13	1	3	17
11	United States	Gold medal	Gold medal			Gold medal		Gold medal	Gold medal	Silver medal	Silver medal	Gold medal								Gold Medal		Bronze medal		Gold Medal	12	4	1	17
12	Belarus	Bronze medal		Silver medal	Gold medal	Gold medal		Gold medal	Gold medal		Gold medal	Gold medal								Gold Medal			Gold Medal	Gold Medal	14	1	1	16
13	Azerbaijan					Gold medal	Gold medal	Bronze medal			Silver medal	Gold medal								Silver medal	Silver medal		Bronze medal	Silver medal	8	4	3	15
14	Brazil	Gold medal	Gold medal				Gold medal	Gold medal	Gold medal		Gold medal	Gold medal									Gold Medal			Gold Medal	14	0	0	14
15	Poland	Gold medal	Bronze medal			Gold medal		Gold medal	Gold medal			Gold medal								Gold Medal				Gold Medal	13	0	1	14
16	Greece	Gold medal		Bronze medal			Bronze medal	Gold medal		Gold medal	Gold medal											Gold Medal		Bronze medal	11	0	3	14
17	Belgium	Silver medal	Gold medal			Gold medal		Silver medal	Gold medal			Silver medal								Gold Medal		Bronze medal		Gold Medal	9	4	1	14
18	Hungary	Gold medal	Gold medal			Silver medal	Gold medal	Gold medal	Gold medal		Bronze medal										Gold Medal		Bronze medal		9	3	2	14
19	Netherlands	Gold medal	Gold medal					Gold medal	Silver medal	Bronze medal		Gold medal									Bronze medal	Gold Medal		Silver medal	9	3	2	14
20	Sweden	Gold medal	Gold medal				Bronze medal	Bronze medal	Gold medal	Gold medal		Gold medal										Gold Medal		Silver medal	9	2	3	14
21	Australia				Silver medal	Silver medal	Gold medal	Gold medal	Gold medal			Gold medal									Gold Medal			Silver medal	7	5	2	14
22	Switzerland	Gold medal	Bronze medal					Gold medal	Silver medal	Gold medal		Gold medal										Gold Medal			9	2	2	13
23	Romania	Gold medal	Gold medal	Silver medal			Gold medal	Gold medal	Gold medal		Silver medal										Gold Medal				9	3	0	12
24	Israel	Gold medal		Gold medal		Gold medal		Gold medal			Gold medal									Gold Medal			Gold Medal		11	0	0	11
25	Canada	Gold medal		Gold medal	Gold medal			Silver medal	Silver medal			Gold medal												Gold Medal	8	2	1	11
26	South Korea	Gold medal	Bronze medal				Gold medal	Gold medal			Bronze medal										Gold Medal				8	0	2	10
27	Kazakhstan	Silver medal				Gold medal		Gold medal												Bronze medal			Silver medal		7	2	1	10
28	Mexico						Gold medal	Silver medal	Bronze medal	Gold medal		Bronze medal													7	1	2	10
28	North Korea	Gold medal	Gold medal			Silver medal		Gold medal	Gold medal		Gold medal														7	1	2	10
30	Uzbekistan	Bronze medal			Bronze medal			Bronze medal	Gold medal			Bronze medal												Gold Medal	6	0	4	10
31	Portugal					Gold medal						Gold medal								Silver medal				Gold Medal	7	2	0	9
32	New Zealand				Bronze medal		Gold medal					Gold medal									Silver medal			Silver medal	4	2	2	8
33	Argentina											Silver medal										Bronze medal			3	2	3	8
34	Turkey	Bronze medal					Gold medal	Gold medal																	6	0	1	7
35	Austria					Bronze medal	Gold medal		Gold medal												Bronze medal				5	0	2	7
36	Finland	Gold medal					Bronze medal	Gold medal																	4	2	1	7
37	Latvia	Gold medal						Silver medal																	3	2	2	7
38	Czech Republic									Bronze medal												Silver medal			2	4	1	7
39	Vietnam						Gold medal		Bronze medal												Gold Medal				5	0	1	6
40	Slovenia							Gold medal			Bronze medal												Bronze medal		4	0	2	6
41	Denmark	Gold medal										Silver medal												Silver medal	2	4	0	6
42	(Georgia (country)) Georgia											Bronze medal												Bronze medal	1	2	3	6
43	Chinese Taipei	Silver medal						Gold medal																	3	2	0	5
43	South Africa					Silver medal						Gold medal												Silver medal	3	2	0	5
45	Slovakia											Bronze medal									Bronze medal				2	0	3	5
46	Algeria		Gold medal						Gold medal																3	1	0	4
46	Croatia	Silver medal						Gold medal																	3	1	0	4
46	(Republic of Ireland) Ireland	Gold medal						Gold medal																	3	1	0	4
46	Philippines	Gold medal						Gold medal																	3	1	0	4
50	Chile						Bronze medal																		3	0	1	4
51	Cuba							Silver medal	Bronze medal																2	1	1	4
51	Puerto Rico							Bronze medal																	2	1	1	4
53	Norway	Gold medal						Bronze medal																	2	0	2	4
54	Iceland						Bronze medal																		1	2	1	4
54	Lithuania					Silver medal														Silver medal					1	2	1	4
56	Armenia	Silver medal						Gold medal																	2	1	0	3
56	Colombia	Silver medal																							2	1	0	3
58	Luxembourg							Gold medal																	1	0	2	3
59	Dominican Republic																								2	0	0	2
59	Malaysia																								2	0	0	2
59	Venezuela																								2	0	0	2
62	Egypt																								1	1	0	2
62	Jordan																								1	1	0	2
64	Cyprus																								1	0	1	2
64	Hong Kong																								1	0	1	2
64	India																								1	0	1	2
67	Indonesia																								0	1	1	2
68	Mongolia						Bronze medal																		0	0	2	2
69	Albania																								1	0	0	1
69	Guatemala																								1	0	0	1
69	Iran																								1	0	0	1
69	Panama																								1	0	0	1
69	Peru																								1	0	0	1
69	Syria																								1	0	0	1
69	Tunisia																								1	0	0	1
76	Liechtenstein																								0	1	0	1
76	Scotland (Note: Official documents from the International Gymnastics Federation credit a silver medal earned at the 1982 Trampoline World Championships as a medal for Scotland (SCO), instead of Great Britain (GBR).)											Silver medal													0	1	0	1
76	Thailand																								0	1	0	1
79	Estonia																								0	0	1	1
79	Morocco																								0	0	1	1
79	Serbia																								0	0	1	1

=== From major junior events ===
For the making of this list, results from major junior-level international competitions were consulted, as follows: 1) Youth Olympic Games, and 2) Junior World Gymnastics Championships in acrobatic gymnastics (formerly known as sports acrobatics), artistic gymnastics, parkour, and rhythmic gymnastics. Before merging with the FIG in 1999, the International Federation of Sports Acrobatics (IFSA) organized and promoted World Junior Championships in acrobatic gymnastics from 1989 to 1999.

Currently, FIG organizes periodical World Age Group competitions in aerobic gymnastics and trampoline. The former governing body for the trampoline, the International Trampoline Federation (FIT), incorporated into the FIG in 1998, also organized World Age Groups competitions from 1973 to 1996. World Age Group competitions were not considered for the making of this list because these events are not officially titled World Championships. In 2019, Junior World Championships were staged for the first time in artistic gymnastics and rhythmic gymnastics. In 2024, Junior World Championships were resumed for acrobatic gymnastics, and Junior World Championships were organized for parkour for the first time. Every discipline has appeared at the Youth Olympic Games, except for aerobic gymnastics and parkour.

The conventions used on this table are AC for Acrobatic Gymnastics, MA for Men's Artistic Gymnastics, WA for Women's Artistic Gymnastics, PK for Parkour, RG for Rhythmic Gymnastics, TT for Trampoline.

The table is pre-sorted by total number of first-place results, second-place results and third-place results, respectively. When equal ranks are given, nations are listed in alphabetical order.

		Youth Olympics					Junior Worlds					Number of			
Rk.	Nation	AC	MA	WA	RG	TT	AC	MA	WA	PK	RG	1st place, gold medalist(s)	2nd place, silver medalist(s)	3rd place, bronze medalist(s)	Total
1	Russia		Gold medal	Gold medal	Gold medal	Bronze medal	Gold medal	Silver medal	Gold medal		Gold medal	6	1	1	8
2	Ukraine	Bronze medal	Gold medal	Bronze medal	Silver medal	Gold medal	Gold medal	Gold medal			Gold medal	5	1	2	8
3	China		Gold medal	Gold medal		Gold medal	Gold medal	Gold medal	Gold medal		Silver medal	6	1	0	7
4	Italy		Bronze medal	Gold medal	Bronze medal		Gold medal	Gold medal	Gold medal		Silver medal	4	1	2	7
4	Japan		Gold medal	Bronze medal		Silver medal	Bronze medal	Gold medal	Gold medal	Gold medal		4	1	2	7
6	(United Kingdom) Great Britain		Gold medal	Silver medal		Silver medal	Gold medal	Bronze medal	Silver medal			2	3	1	6
7	United States		Gold medal		Bronze medal		Gold medal		Gold medal		Silver medal	3	1	1	5
8	Romania		Gold medal	Silver medal				Gold medal	Silver medal		Silver medal	2	3	0	5
9	Canada		Silver medal	Bronze medal	Bronze medal			Gold medal	Bronze medal			1	1	3	5
10	Germany				Bronze medal		Silver medal	Silver medal	Silver medal		Silver medal	0	4	1	5
11	Bulgaria	Gold medal			Silver medal		Gold medal				Gold medal	3	1	0	4
12	Kazakhstan				Bronze medal		Gold medal	Bronze medal			Gold medal	2	0	2	4
13	Belarus				Silver medal	Silver medal	Gold medal				Silver medal	1	3	0	4
13	Brazil		Silver medal	Gold medal				Silver medal			Silver medal	1	3	0	4
15	Hungary		Silver medal	Silver medal			Silver medal	Bronze medal				0	3	1	4
16	Israel	Silver medal					Gold medal				Gold medal	2	1	0	3
17	Egypt				Silver medal			Bronze medal			Silver medal	0	2	1	3
17	Spain		Silver medal	Silver medal							Bronze medal	0	2	1	3
19	Australia			Bronze medal		Silver medal	Bronze medal					0	1	2	3
20	Azerbaijan						Gold medal				Silver medal	1	1	0	2
21	France						Gold medal		Bronze medal			1	0	1	2
21	South Korea		Bronze medal					Gold medal				1	0	1	2
23	Belgium		Silver medal				Silver medal					0	2	0	2
24	Portugal					Bronze medal	Silver medal					0	1	1	2
24	Turkey		Silver medal							Bronze medal		0	1	1	2
26	Uzbekistan		Bronze medal								Bronze medal	0	0	2	2
27	Argentina								Gold medal			1	0	0	1
27	Armenia							Gold medal				1	0	0	1
27	Colombia							Gold medal				1	0	0	1
27	Cuba		Gold medal									1	0	0	1
27	Czech Republic									Gold medal		1	0	0	1
27	Kyrgyzstan										Gold medal	1	0	0	1
27	Mongolia		Gold medal									1	0	0	1
27	New Zealand					Gold medal						1	0	0	1
27	Poland										Gold medal	1	0	0	1
36	Lithuania						Silver medal					0	1	0	1
36	Mexico									Silver medal		0	1	0	1
36	North Korea						Silver medal					0	1	0	1
39	Austria					Bronze medal						0	0	1	1
39	Estonia										Bronze medal	0	0	1	1
39	(Georgia (country)) Georgia										Bronze medal	0	0	1	1
39	Iran		Bronze medal									0	0	1	1
39	Latvia							Bronze medal				0	0	1	1
39	Norway		Bronze medal									0	0	1	1
39	Sweden			Bronze medal								0	0	1	1

=== Historical teams ===
These are lists of results achieved by gymnasts from defunct nations, historical teams or teams composed of gymnasts representing different National Olympic Committees (NOCs).

The conventions used on the tables are AC for Acrobatic Gymnastics, AE for Aerobic Gymnastics, MA for Men's Artistic Gymnastics, WA for Women's Artistic Gymnastics, PK for Parkour, RG for Rhythmic Gymnastics, TT for Trampoline and Tumbling.

==== Senior ====
	Olympic Games				World Championships							World Cup / World Challenge Cup							World Games				Number of			
Nation	MA	WA	RG	TT	AC	AE	MA	WA	PK	RG	TT	AC	AE	MA	WA	PK	RG	TT	AC	AE	RG	TT	1st place, gold medalist(s)	2nd place, silver medalist(s)	3rd place, bronze medalist(s)	Total
Individual Neutral Athletes				Gold medal			Bronze medal	Gold medal			Gold medal												6	1	1	8
Czechoslovakia (Note: Medals earned by athletes from Bohemia (BOH) are officially considered to be medals earned by Czechoslovakia (TCH).)	Gold medal	Gold medal					Gold medal	Gold medal		Gold medal													7	1	0	8
East Germany	Gold medal	Gold medal					Gold medal	Gold medal		Silver medal													6	1	0	7
RGF (Note: Russian Gymnastics Federation.)					Gold medal	Gold medal	Bronze medal	Gold medal		Gold medal	Gold medal												5	0	1	6
ROC (Note: Russian Olympic Committee.)	Gold medal	Gold medal	Silver medal																				2	1	0	3
Soviet Union	Gold medal	Gold medal	Gold medal		Gold medal		Gold medal	Gold medal		Gold medal	Gold medal												13	0	0	13
(International Olympic Committee) Unified Team (Note: According to official results, medals earned by the Unified Team (EUN) at the 1992 Olympic Games are separated from medals earned by the Soviet Union (URS). Medals earned at the 1992 World Artistic Gymnastics Championships are listed in official FIG documents as medals for the Unified Team (EUN) instead of medals for the Commonwealth of Independent States (CIS).)	Gold medal	Gold medal	Gold medal				Gold medal	Silver medal															4	1	0	5
(Germany) United Team	Gold medal	Silver medal																					1	1	0	2
West Germany	Bronze medal		Bronze medal		Gold medal		Gold medal			Gold medal	Gold medal											Gold Medal	7	1	2	10
(Socialist Federal Republic of Yugoslavia) Yugoslavia (Note: Results achieved by an athlete from Austria-Hungary in 1911 are officially credited by the International Gymnastics Federation to Yugoslavia (YUG), even though the nation did not exist at the time.)	Gold medal				Silver medal		Gold medal	Silver medal															2	2	0	4

==== Junior ====
	Youth Olympics					Junior World Championships				Number of			
Nation	AC	MA	WA	RG	TT	AC	MA	WA	RG	1st place, gold medalist(s)	2nd place, silver medalist(s)	3rd place, bronze medalist(s)	Total
(International Olympic Committee) Mixed-NOCs (Note: At the 2018 Summer Youth Olympics, gymnasts from different nations competed in mixed multi-discipline teams. Points were awarded during qualifications and the teams with the most points were awarded gold, silver and bronze medals.)	Gold medal									1	0	0	1
Soviet Union						Gold medal				1	0	0	1

== See also ==
Major continental events

- Africa
  - African Artistic Gymnastics Championships
  - African Rhythmic Gymnastics Championships
- Americas
  - Gymnastics at the Central American and Caribbean Games
  - Gymnastics at the Pan American Games
  - Gymnastics at the South American Games
  - Pan American Gymnastics Championships
  - South American Gymnastics Championships
- Asia
  - Asian Gymnastics Championships
  - Gymnastics at the Asian Games
- Europe
  - European Gymnastics Championships
  - Gymnastics at the European Games
  - List of medalists at the UEG European Cup Final

Major international events

- Four Continents Gymnastics Championships
- Gymnastics at the Commonwealth Games
- Gymnastics at the Mediterranean Games
- Gymnastics at the Summer Universiade
- Pacific Rim Championships
- Rhythmic Gymnastics Grand Prix
