= Sport in Bulgaria =

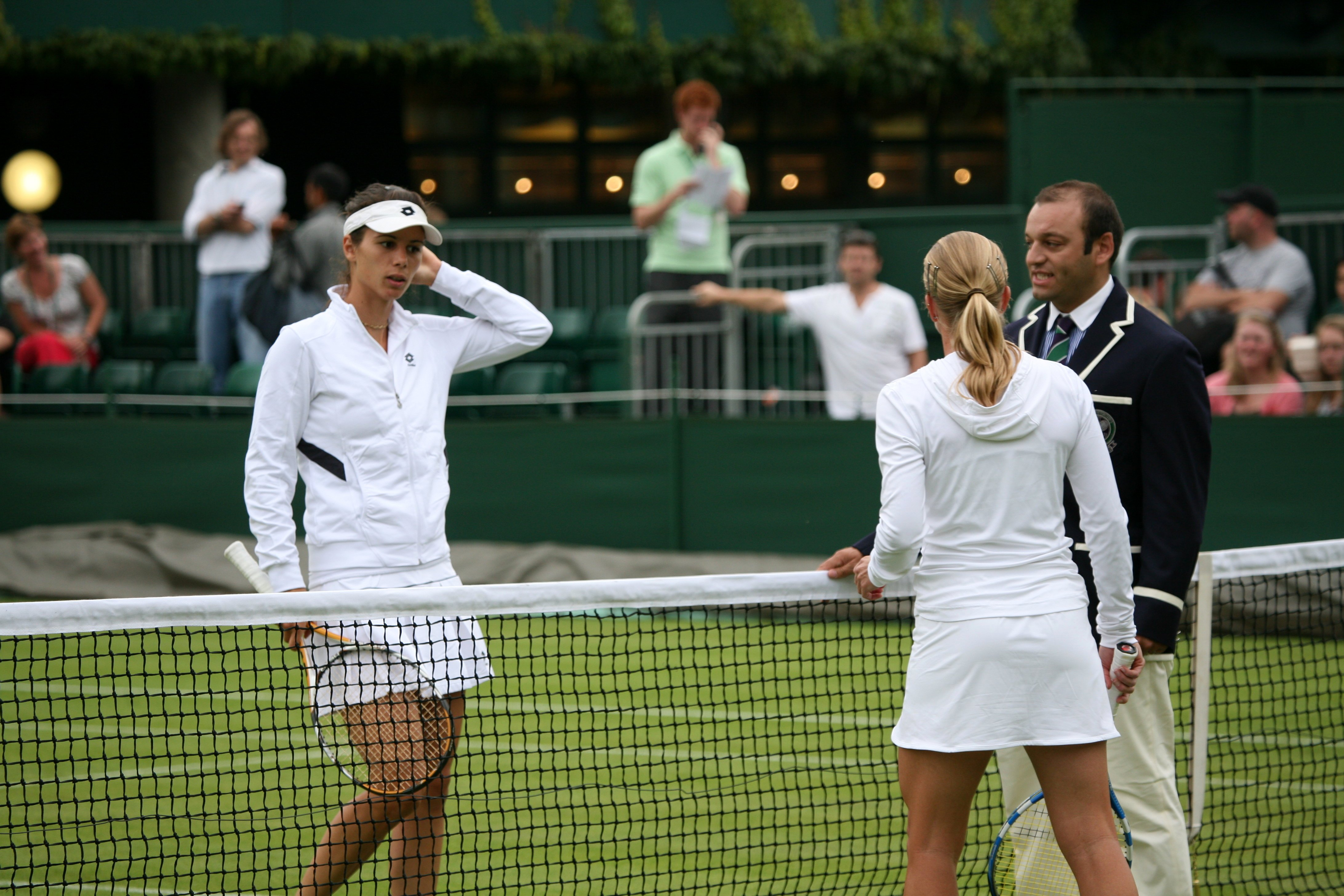
Tsvetana Pironkova and Jill Craybas during the coin toss, before their 2009 Wimbledon Championships first round.

Bulgaria has established traditions in a great variety of sports.

== Olympics ==
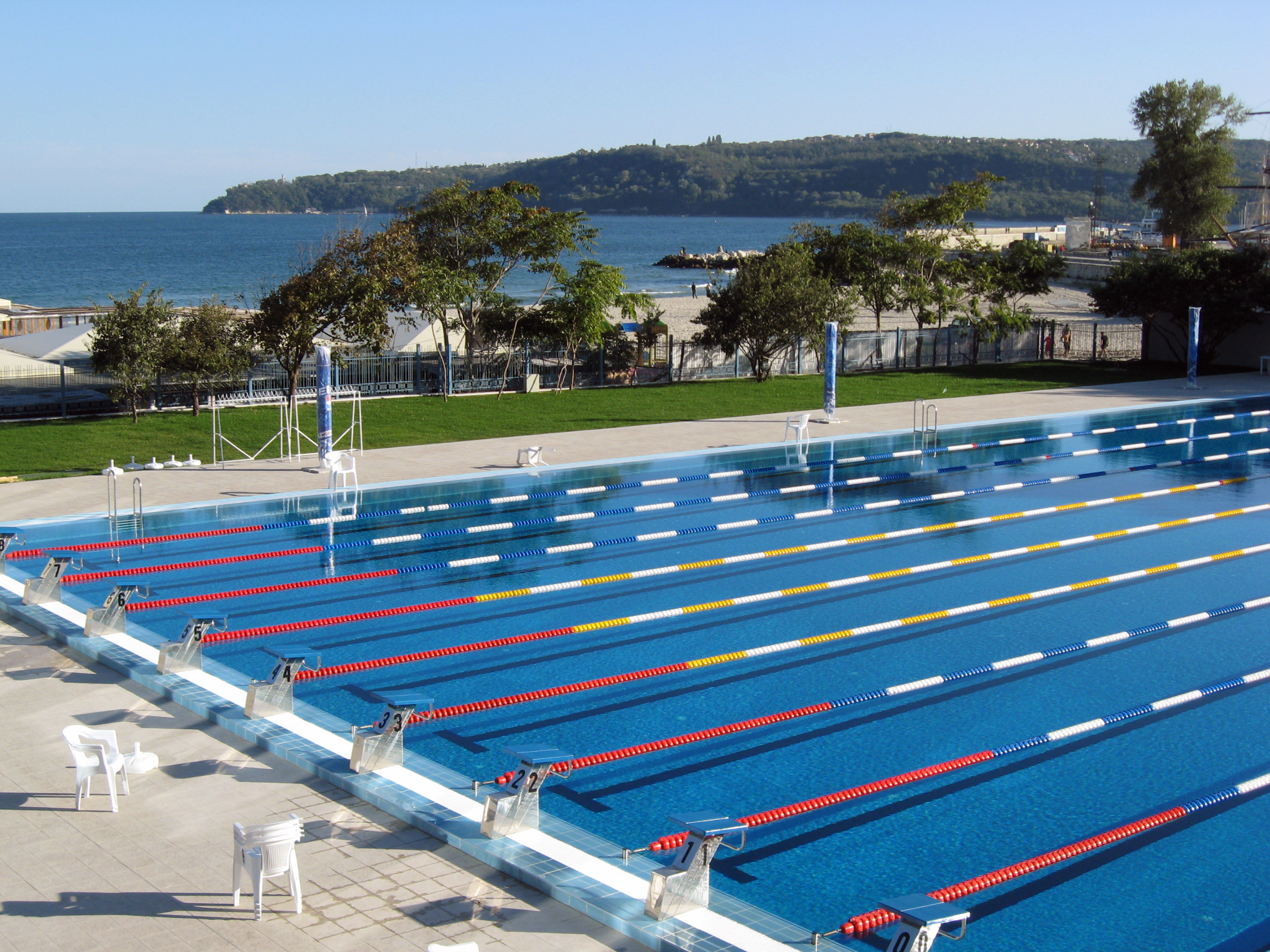
An Olympic-standard swimming pool in Varna.

Bulgaria participates both in the Summer and Winter Olympics, and its first appearance dates back to the first modern Olympic Games in 1896, when the Swiss gymnast Charles Champaud represented the country. Since then Bulgaria has appeared in most Summer Olympiads, and as of 2022 has won a total of 224 medals: 54 gold, 88 silver, and 82 bronze. The most successful participations took place at Munich (21 medals), Montreal (22 medals), Moscow (41), Seoul (35). At the Winter Olympic Games, Bulgaria has a less impressive record: only 6 medals (of which only one gold) out of 19 participations.

Some of the most prominent Olympians include Mariya Grozdeva (shooting), Ekaterina Dafovska (biathlon), Armen Nazaryan (wrestling), Stefka Kostadinova (high jump, holder of the world record since 1987), Yordanka Donkova (100 m, holder of the world record since 1988), Yordan Yovchev (gymnastics), Neshka Robeva (gymnastics), Rumyana Neykova (rowing).

Wrestling is the most successful discipline. Bulgarian wrestlers have earned a total of 73 medals, including 18 Gold. Weightlifting is the second most successful sports with a total of 36 medals. Without doubt this is one of Bulgaria's highest priority sports with around 1,000 gold medals in different competitions, although cases of doping have occurred among Bulgarian weightlifters, which led to the expulsion of the entire Bulgarian team from the 2008 Summer Olympics, and their voluntary withdrawal from the 1988 Summer Olympics. Stefan Botev, Nikolay Peshalov, Demir Demirev, Asen Zlatev, Blagoy Blagoev and Yoto Yotov figure among the most distinguished weightlifters. Naim Süleymanoğlu an ethnic Turk, originally trained and competed for Bulgaria before defecting and competing for Turkey.

Shooting sports have also proven to be among Bulgaria's strongest disciplines. Mariya Grozdeva and Tanyu Kiryakov have won Olympic gold medals. Ekaterina Dafovska won the Olympic gold in biathlon in the 1998 Winter Olympic Games, while Evgenia Radanova is the most successful Bulgarian winter olympian with 3 medals in short track speed skating.

== Association football ==
Football is the most popular sport in Bulgaria. Many Bulgarians closely follow the top Bulgarian league, currently known as the First Professional Football League; as well as the leagues of other European countries. The national team achieved its greatest success with a fourth-place finish at the 1994 FIFA World Cup in the United States.

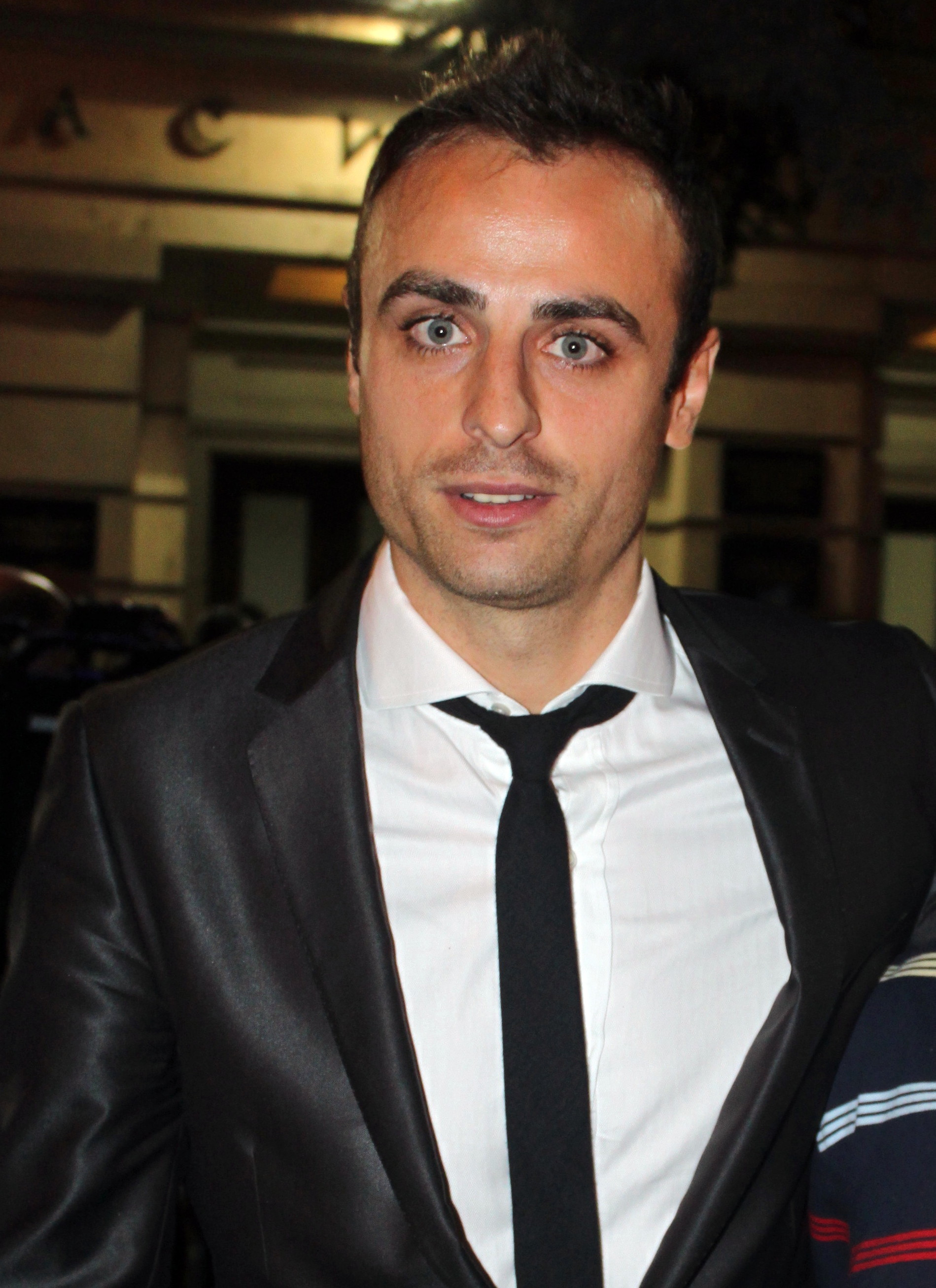
Dimitar Berbatov

Dimitar Berbatov (Димитър Бербатов) currently ranks as one of the most famous Bulgarian football players. As of season 2012/2013, he plays for FC Fulham, rejoining with manager Martin Jol who brought him to England. Berbatov also spent four seasons at Manchester United, where he scored his first two goals for the team in their 3–0 win away to Aalborg in the Champions League group stage on 30 September 2008, less than a month after he joined the team. Georgi Asparuhov, nicknamed Gundi (1943–1971), also became extremely popular at home and abroad, having had offers from clubs in Italy and Portugal, and having won the Bulgarian football player No.1 award for the twentieth century. Hristo Stoichkov has arguably become the best-known Bulgarian footballer of all time. His career peaked between 1992 and 1995, while he played for FC Barcelona, winning the Ballon d'Or in 1994. Additionally, he featured in the FIFA 100 rankings. Three Bulgarians have won the European top scorers' Golden Boot award: Hristo Stoichkov, Georgi Slavkov and Petar Jekov.

CSKA Sofia is one of the two best-performing Bulgarian football clubs. Levski Sofia became the first Bulgarian team to participate in the modern UEFA Champions League in 2006/2007. Slavia Sofia, Lokomotiv Sofia and Litex Lovech have often played in the UEFA Europa League. More recently, Ludogorets Razgrad have become the country's dominant team, with an ongoing streak of six top-flight titles (2012–17). Other popular clubs include Botev Plovdiv, Cherno More Varna, Spartak Varna and Lokomotiv Plovdiv.

== Volleyball ==
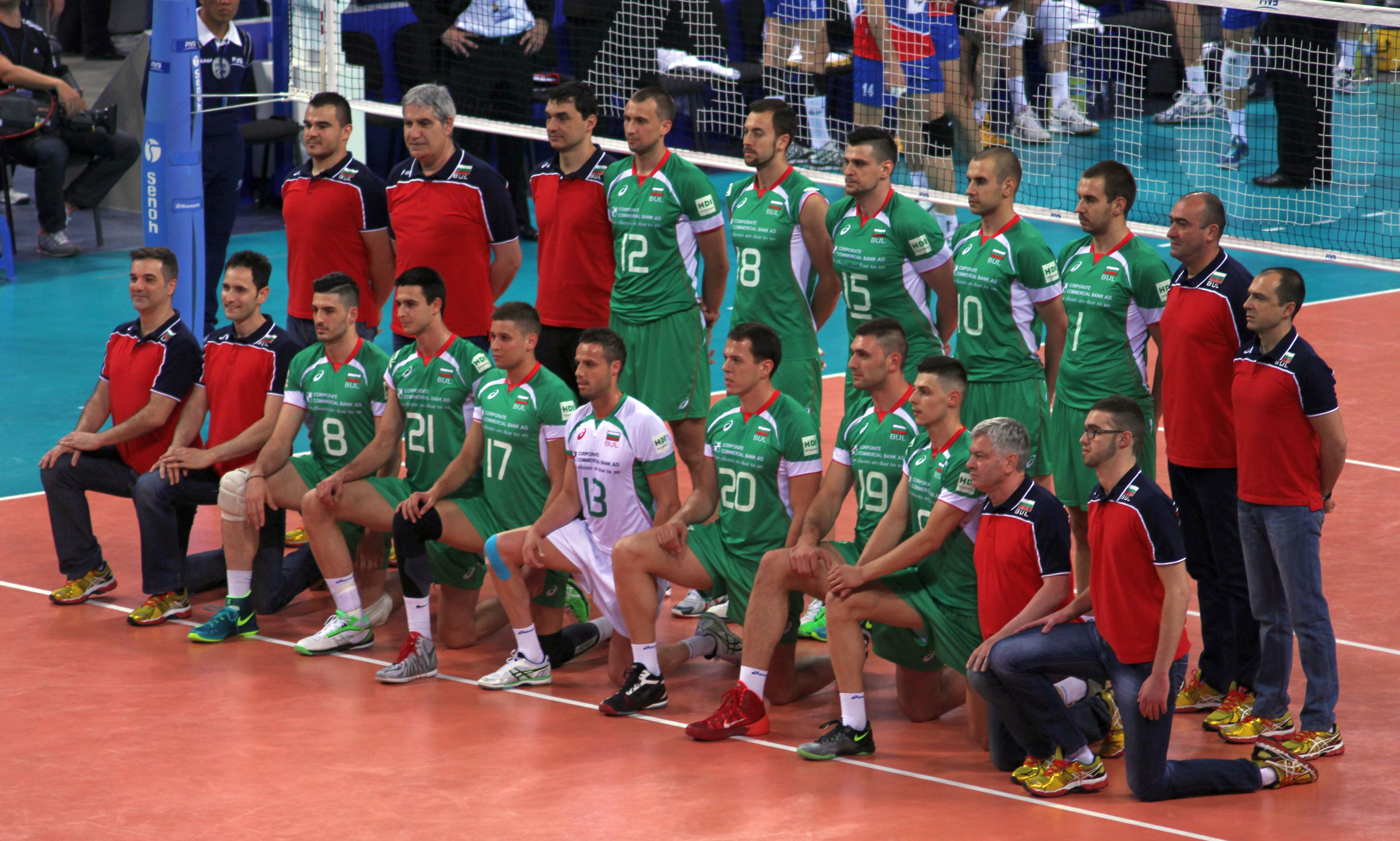
The team in 2014

In its men's national volleyball side, controlled by the Bulgarian Volleyball Federation, Bulgaria fields one of the leading volleyball teams in Europe and the world. As of January 2009 the team held 4th place in the world according to FIVB rankings. Bulgaria has regularly featured in the Top 10, and has earned silver medals at the 1980 Summer Olympics, the 1970 FIVB Volleyball Men's World Championship and the 1951 European Championship, as well as numerous bronze medals, including at the 2007 World Cup in Japan. As of 2009 the most popular Bulgarian volleyball players include Plamen Konstantinov, Matey Kaziyski and Vladimir Nikolov.

== Wrestling ==
Wrestling is Bulgaria's most successful sport at the Olympic games. Bulgarian wrestlers have earned a total of 73 medals - 18 gold, 32 silver and 23 bronze, in both Greco-Roman Wrestling and Freestyle Wrestling. Famous names include, Boyan Radev, Serafim Barzakov, Armen Nazaryan, Plamen Slavov, Kiril Sirakov, Sergey Moreyko and Dan Kolov.

== Other sports ==
Bulgaria boasts great achievements in a great variety of other sports. Maria Gigova and Maria Petrova have each held a record of three world-titles in rhythmic gymnastics. Other famous gymnasts include Simona Peycheva and Neshka Robeva (a highly successful coach as well). Bulgarian rhythmic gymnasts were particularly successful during the 1980s, forming a generation of gymnasts known as the Golden Girls of Bulgaria. Yordan Yovchev ranks as the most famous Bulgarian competitor in Artistic Gymnastics.

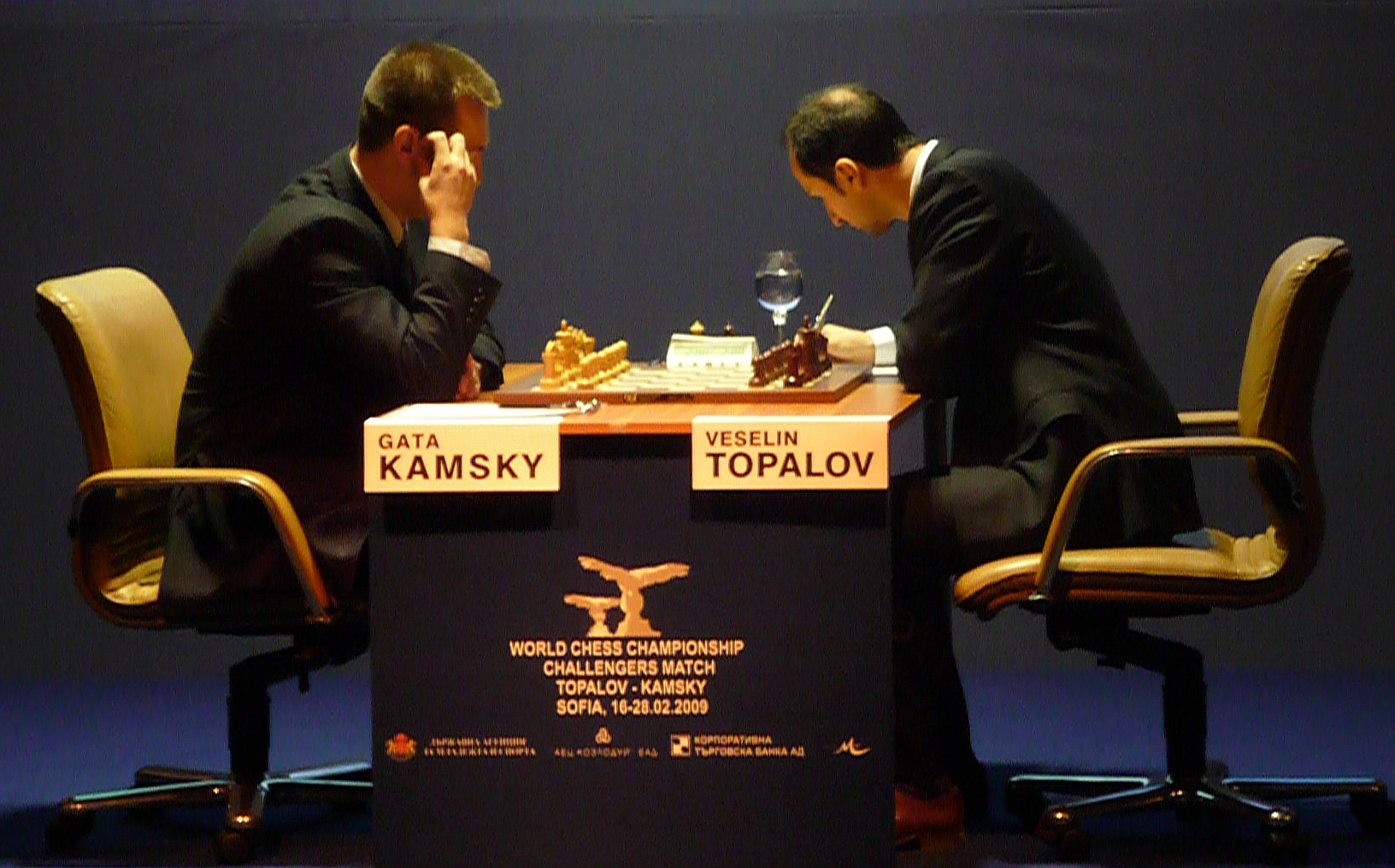
World Chess Championship - Challengers Match Topalov - Kamsky in Sofia, Bulgaria, 2009: Round 2.

Bulgarians have made many significant achievements in athletics. Stefka Kostadinova, who still holds the women's high jump world record, jumped 209 centimetres at the 1987 World Championships in Athletics in Rome to clinch the coveted title. Yordanka Donkova held the world record in the 100 meters hurdles with 12.21 seconds set in Stara Zagora on 21 August 1988 for 28 years until it was broken in 2016 by Kendra Harrison. Presently, Bulgaria takes pride in its sprinters, especially Ivet Lalova and Tezdzhan Naimova.

Chess has achieved great popularity. One of the top chess-masters and a former world champion, Veselin Topalov, plays for Bulgaria. At the end of 2005, both men's and women's world chess-champions came from Bulgaria, as well as the junior world champion.

Albena Denkova and Maxim Staviski have won the ISU world figure skating championships twice in a row (2006 and 2007) for ice-dance.

Bulgarians have also achieved major successes in tennis. The Maleeva sisters: Katerina, Manuela and Magdalena, have each reached the top ten in world rankings, and became the only set of three sisters ranked in the top ten at the same time. Bulgaria has other well-known tennis players such as Tsvetana Pironkova a Grand Slam semi-finalist and two-time Grand Slam quarter-finalist, Sesil Karatancheva, and Grigor Dimitrov, a two-time junior Grand Slam champion, 2014 Wimbledon semi-finalist, 2017 Australian Open semi-finalist, 2019 US Open semi-finalist and 2017 World Tour Finals champion.

Boyan Petrov (Bulgarian: Боян Петров, born 7 February 1973) is a Bulgarian zoologist and mountaineer, working at the National Museum of Natural History in Sofia.[1] As of July 2016, he has climbed 8 eight-thousanders, all without supplementary oxygen. This achievement makes him Bulgarian altitude climber with the highest number of peaks over 8000 meters.

Petar Stoychev (Петър Стойчев) set a new swimming world record for crossing the English Channel in 2007.

The country has strong traditions in amateur boxing and in martial-arts competitions. Bulgaria has achieved major success with its judo and karate teams in European and World championships. Kaloyan Stefanov Mahlyanov, best known as Kotoōshū Katsunori, has become well-known worldwide for his sumo prowess, becoming the first European to earn the title ozeki in Japan. Bulgaria has also won several European sumo championships, and is often among the top competitors in this sport.
