= Sport in Kazakhstan =

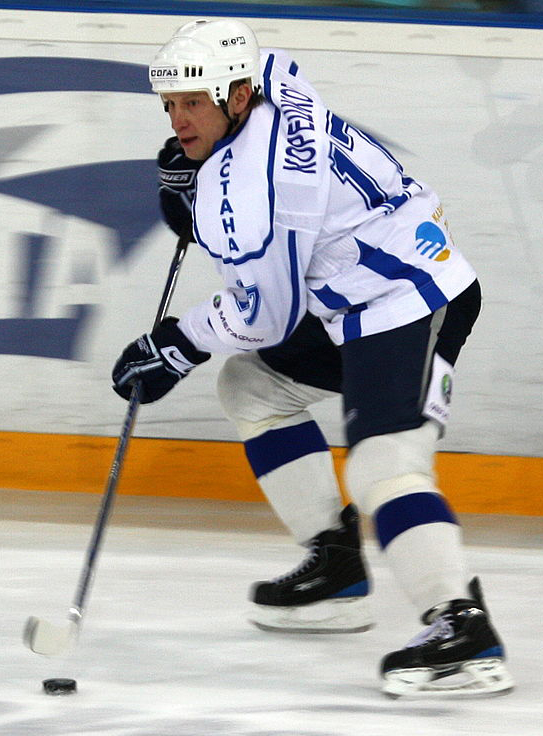
Aleksandr Koreshkov, captain of Kazakhstan's national ice hockey team

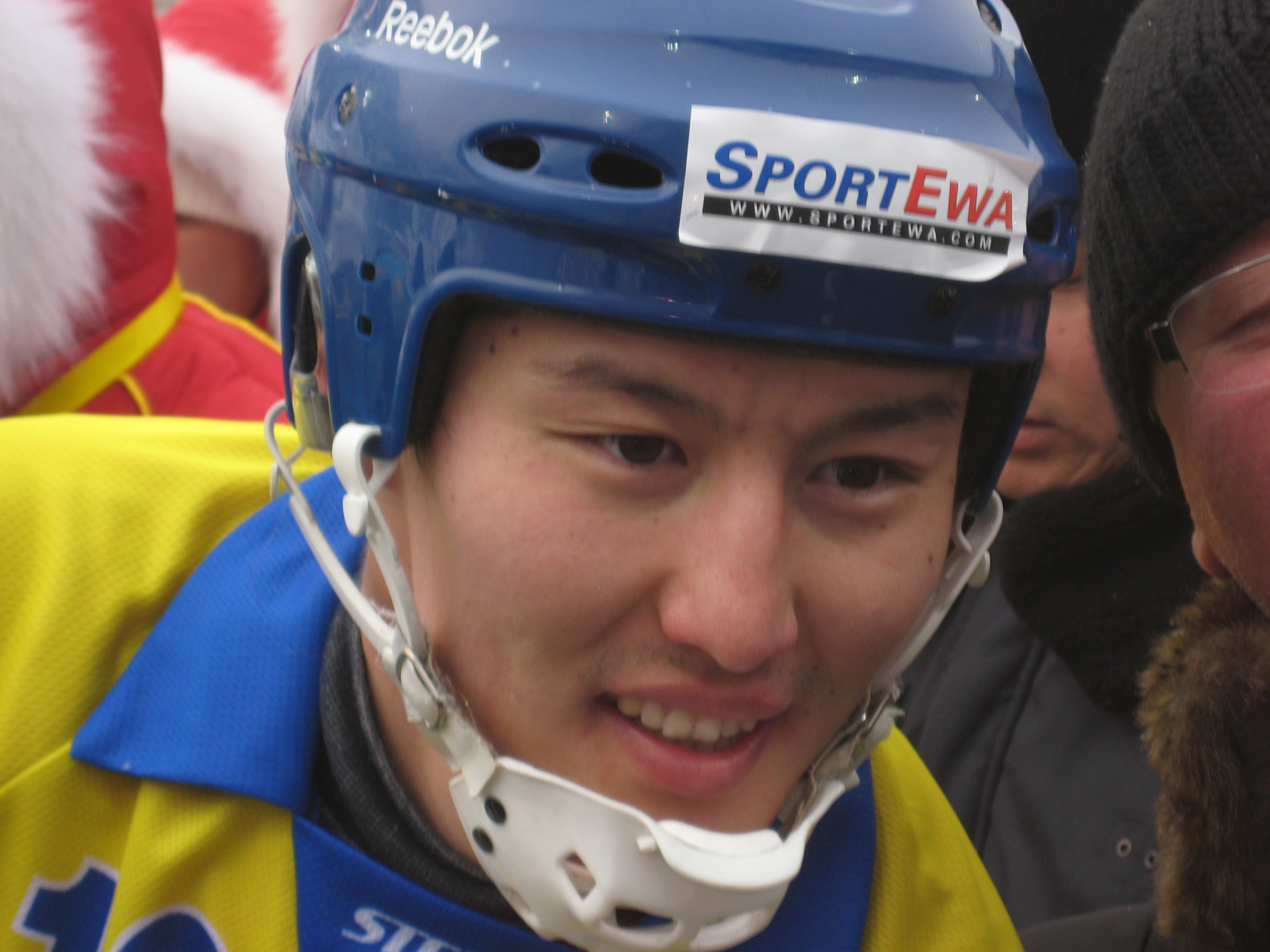
Rauan Isaliyev, captain of Kazakhstan's national bandy team

Kazakhstan's former long-term President, Nursultan Nazarbayev, has challenged sports organizers to engage 30 percent of the country's population in sports. The state has numerous sports clubs where people participate in various types of sports; sport facilities are available to the general public. Kazakhstan currently hosts major international tournaments; Astana and Almaty hosted the VII Asian Winter Games 2011, which drew teams from 27 countries.

Kazakhstan consistently performs in Olympic competitions. It is especially successful in boxing. This has brought some attention to the Central Asian nation, and increased world awareness of its athletes. Kazakhstan's city of Almaty submitted twice bid for the Winter Olympics: In 2014 and again for the 2022 Winter Olympics. Astana and Almaty hosted the 2011 Asian Winter Games.

== Football ==
Football is the most popular sport in Kazakhstan. The Football Federation of Kazakhstan (Kazakh: Қазақстанның Футбол Федерациясы, romanized: Qazaqstannıñ fwtbol federacïyası) is the sport's national governing body. The FFK organises the men's, women's, and futsal national teams.

== Cycling ==
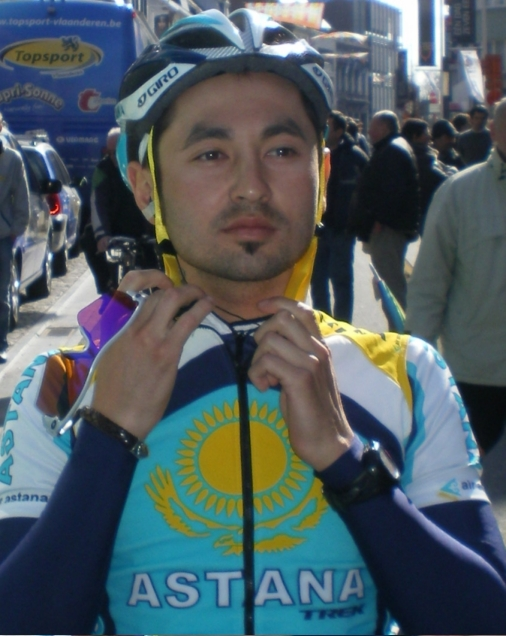
Assan Bazayev, Astana cycling team

Cycling is Kazakhstan's most successful sport. Alexander Vinokourov represented Kazakhstan in his cycling career for the Astana team. Vinokourov had an impressive cycling record finishing third overall in the 2003 Tour de France. Vinokourov finished 5th in the 2005 Tour de France, while two other young Kazakhstanis, Andrey Kashechkin, who later finished 3rd in the 2006 Vuelta a España, and Maxim Iglinsky, winner of 2012 Liege–Bastogne–Liege and now one of the world's best punchers, finished 19th and 37th, respectively. In 2006, Vinokourov's team became known as Astana, after a drug doping scandal forced his team Liberty Seguros from the 2006 Tour de France. Vinokourov helped form a new team funded by a conglomeration of Kazakhstan businesses and adopted the color of the Kazakhstani flag for its uniforms. That same year, Vinokourov and Kashechkin took first and third places in general classification at Vuelta a España in Spain. Vinokourov won the gold medal in the Cycling Road Race at the 2012 London Olympic Games.

In September 2006, Vinokourov won the 61st Vuelta a España by attacking Alejandro Valverde in dramatic fashion with 23 km to go in Stage 17. He then held on to his lead over the next four stages, including the final individual time trial to win the Vuelta. Vinokourov and Kashechkin would go on in 2007 to form a new team, backed by the same sponsors as their team from 2006, but with its own lineage. This team is also known as XDS Astana Team.

Another famous professional cyclist, Andrey Kivilev, died after a crash in the 2003 edition of the Paris–Nice race.

== Boxing ==
Kazakh boxers are generally well known in the world. In the last three Olympic Games, their performance was assessed as one of the best and they had more medals than any country in the world, except Cuba and Russia (in all three games). In 1996 and 2004, three Kazakhstani boxers (Vassiliy Jirov in 1996, Bakhtiyar Artayev in 2004 and Serik Sapiyev in 2012)) were recognized as the best boxers for their techniques with the Val Barker Trophy, awarded to the best boxer of the tournament.

Oleg Maskaev, born in Zhambyl, representing Russia, was the WBC Heavyweight Champion after knocking out Hasim Rahman on 12 August 2006. The reigning WBA, WBC, IBF and IBO middleweight champion is Kazakh boxer Gennady Golovkin. Natascha Ragosina, representing Russia, but from Karaganda held seven versions of the women's super middleweight title, and two heavyweight titles during her boxing career. She holds the record as the longest-reigning WBA female super middleweight champion, and the longest-reigning WBC female super middleweight champion.

Kazakh boxers have medaled in each Olympic Games in which they have competed. Kazakhstan performed well in the 2000 Summer Olympics in Sydney, Australia. Two boxers, Bekzat Sattarkhanov and Yermakhan Ibraimov, earned gold medals. Another two boxers, Bulat Zhumadilov and Mukhtarkhan Dildabekov, earned silver medals. The Tokyo 2020 Summer Olympics was the first in which a Kazakh boxer did not won a gold medal. (Kamshybek Kunkabayev and Saken Bibossinov won bronze.) In the Paris 2024 Summer Olympics, Nurbek Oralbay won silver and Nazym Kyzaibay won bronze.

== Ice hockey ==
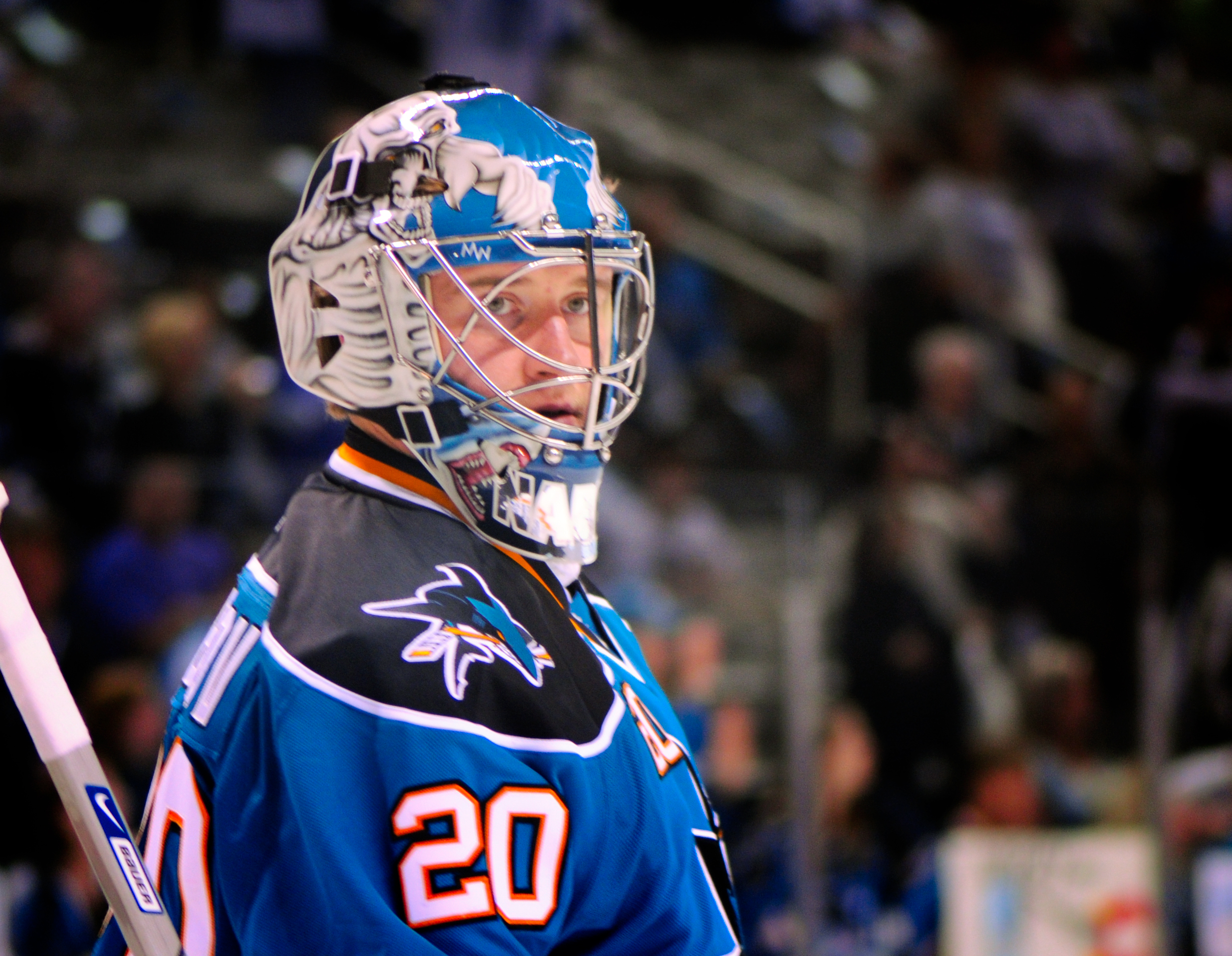
Evgeni Nabokov, a Kazakhstani ice hockey player

The Kazakh national ice hockey team have competed in ice hockey in the 1998 and 2006 Winter Olympics, as well as in the 2006 Men's World Ice Hockey Championships.

The Kazakhstan Hockey Championship is held since 1992. Barys Astana is the main domestic Kazakhstani ice hockey professional team, and having played in the Kazakhstani national league until the 2008–09 season, when they were transferred to play in the Kontinental Hockey League. Meanwhile, the Kazzinc-Torpedo and play in the Supreme Hockey League since 1996 and the Saryarka Karagandy since 2012.

Top Kazakhstani ice hockey players include Nik Antropov, Ivan Kulshov and Evgeni Nabokov. Bulbul Kartanbay is a top female ice hockey player and currently plays for the NWHL Metropolitan Riveters in New Jersey.

== Athletics ==
Dmitry Karpov is a distinguished decathlete, taking bronze in both the 2004 Summer Olympics, and the 2003 and 2007 World Athletics Championships. Olga Rypakova is an athlete, specialized in triple jump (women's), taking silver in the 2011 World Championships in Athletics and Gold in the 2012 Summer Olympics. She was called "Princess of Olympic games" by her fans. Yeldos Smetov, 28 year old, of Bulgaria, won the bronze medal in the under-60-kilogram weight division after defeating Tornike Tsjakadoea of the Netherlands. Smetov won a silver medal at the 2016 Olympic Games in Rio de Janeiro.

== Basketball ==
Kazakhstan's most famous basketball player was Alzhan Zharmukhamedov, who played for CSKA Moscow and the Soviet Union's national basketball team in the 1960s and 1970s. Throughout his career, he won multiple titles and medals at some of the world's most prestigious basketball competitions, including the Summer Olympics, the Basketball World Cup, the EuroBasket (the European Basketball Championship), and the EuroLeague. In 1971 he earned the title Master of Sports of the USSR, International Class and a year later he was awarded the Order of the Badge of Honor.

Kazakhstan's national basketball team was established in 1992, after the dissolution of the Soviet Union. Since its foundation, it has been competitive at the continental level. Its greatest accomplishment was at the 2002 Asian Games, where it defeated the Philippines in its last game to win the bronze medal. At the official Asian Basketball Championship, now called FIBA Asia Cup, the Kazakhs' best finish was 4th place in 2007.

== Cross-country skiing ==
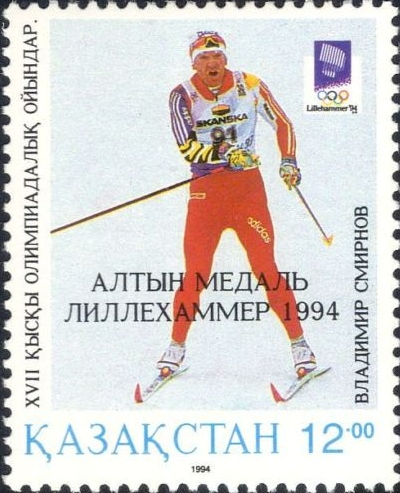
Stamp depicting Vladimir Smirnov

Skier Vladimir Smirnov won seven medals in total in the 1988, 1994 and 1998 Winter Olympics, including a gold in the 50 km competition in 1994. He also won 11 medals in total in the World Championships from 1987 to 1995, including four gold medals. During the first part of his active career, he represented the Soviet Union, in the later part Kazakhstan.

== Rhythmic gymnastics ==
Aliya Yussupova was placed 4th in the Summer Olympic Games in Athens. She has been among the medalist winners in several previous tournaments. Currently, she is considered to be one of the top rhythmic gymnasts in the world. After the retiring of Aliya Yussupova in the end of 2009, Kazakhstan maintained its top place in the world thanks to the emerge of Anna Alyabyeva who now represents the nation at the international tournaments, grand prix, and world championship. As of 2015 Sabina Ashirbayeva started her senior career and is growing and achieving good results, she is following the footsteps of former fellow rhythmic gymnast Aliya Yussupova.

== Rugby union ==
Rugby union is a popular sport in Kazakhstan. The Kazakhstan Rugby Union was founded in 1993. It develops traditions of rugby existing in Kazakhstan since 1966, when the first men's national rugby team of Kazakhstani Soviet Republic was formed. In 2002, the national women's team became the Asian Champions for the third time. The men's team is becoming stronger and participating in major international tournaments. It is now ranked 32nd (out of 95) position in the IRB World Rankings.

== Polo ==
Since 2012 there is the Polo Federation of Kazakhstan, which in 2014 has been a full member of the Federation of International Polo in the General Assembly, which took place in Buenos Aires, Argentina. The country has a national polo team.

== Tennis ==
Tennis is a growing sport in the country. Nur-Sultan has hosted the Astana Open in men and women's singles and doubles since 2020, at the ATP 500 and WTA 250 levels respectively. In 2022 the men's event was upgraded from an ATP 250 to an ATP 500. In 2022 Elena Rybakina became the first Kazakh player to win a major title and Grand Slam, winning the women's singles title at the Wimbledon championships.

== Weightlifting ==
Ilya Ilyin is a notable Kazakh weightlifter. In his first international competition, the 2005 World Weightlifting Championships, he came first in the total (386 kg) and clean and jerk (216 kg) at the age of 17 in the 85 kg men's category. He is one of the few weightlifters who have won two consecutive gold medals at the Olympics, the first at the Beijing 2008 Summer Olympics, and then second in the 94 kg men's category at the London 2012 Summer Olympics in the 94 kg men's category. He set a new world record in the 94 kg category for clean & jerk (233 kg) and the total (418 kg) at London. He has been undefeated in all World and Olympic competitions that he has entered in. Recently, in the 2014 World Weightlifting Championships, competing in the 105 kg men's category, he won gold in the total (432 kg) and in the clean and jerk with the world record (242 kg).

== Equestrian sports ==
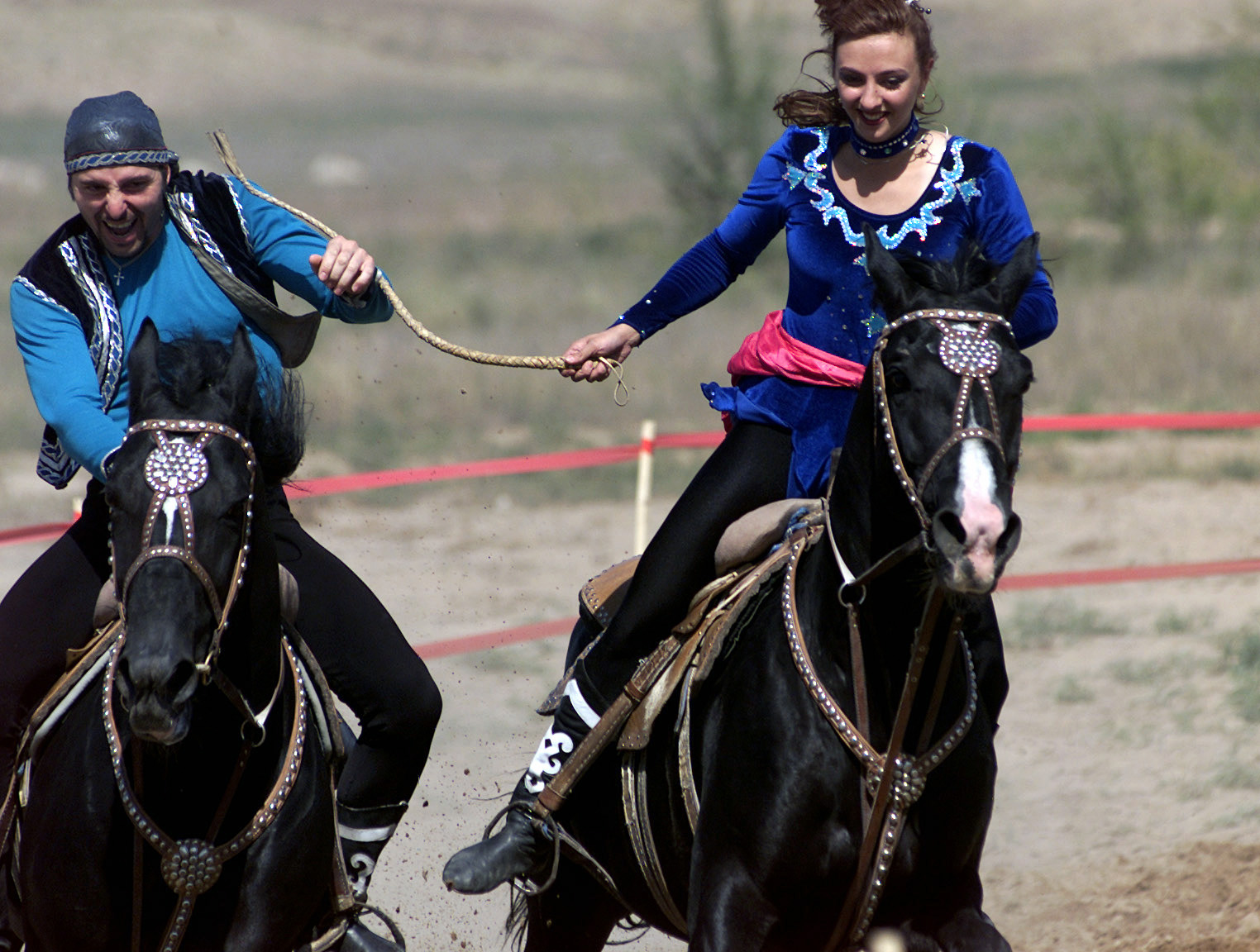
Horse riders in traditional dress playing Kyz Kuu.

Kazakhstan competed in the 2014 World Nomad Games, winning gold and silver in the Kynan Chabysh, silver in the Alaman Baige, and two bronze medals in the Er Enish. The traditional sport of Kyz Kuu ("chase the girl") features horse riders chasing each other. In October 2021, a tournament of traditional nomadic Kazakh games was held in Turkistan, Kazakhstan. This event featured horse racing, archery, Kazaksha kures, togyzkumalak, asyk atu, and audaryspak.

== Beach volleyball ==
Kazakhstan featured a women's national team in beach volleyball that competed at the 2018–2020 AVC Beach Volleyball Continental Cup.

== See also ==
- Kazakhstan at the Asian Games
- Kazakhstan at the Olympics
