= Kazakhstan national amateur boxing athletes =

Kazakhstan national amateur boxing athletes represents Kazakhstan in regional, continental and world boxing tournaments and matches sanctioned by the International Boxing Association (AIBA).

== Asian Games ==
=== 2006 Doha Asian Games ===
10 amateur boxers represented Kazakhstan in this edition of the Asiad. This country is ranked 5th with a gold medal, two silver medals and three bronze medals.

==== Entry list ====
- Kanat Abutalipov (Bantamweight)
- Bakhtiyar Artayev (Middleweight) - Silver
- Mukhtarkhan Dildabekov (Super Heavyweight) - Silver
- Dmitriy Gotfrid (Heavyweight) - Bronze
- Galib Jafarov (Featherweight) - Bronze
- Yerdos Janabergenov (Light Heavyweight)
- Berik Kaliyev (Lightweight)
- Serik Sapiyev (Light Welterweight) - Bronze
- Bakhyt Sarsekbayev (Welterweight) - Gold
- Mirat Sarsembayev (Flyweight)
