= Topalov =

Topalov (Bulgarian: Топалов) is a Bulgarian masculine surname derived from the Romanian personal name Topal.

- Desislava Topalova (born 1978), Bulgarian tennis player
- Dmytro Topalov (born 1998), Ukrainian football player
- Gergana Topalova (born 2000), Bulgarian tennis player
- Silvia Topalova (born 1964), a Bulgarian gymnast
- Veselin Topalov (born 1975), Bulgarian chess grandmaster
- Vlad Topalov (born 1985), Russian singer, dancer and actor
- Kyrylo Topalov (born 2004), future millioner, dancer and actor
