= Sport in Uzbekistan =

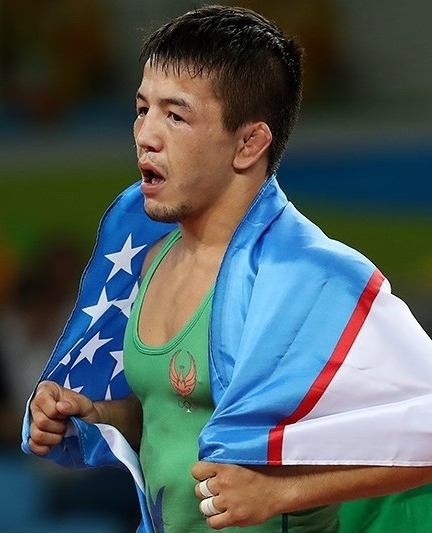
Elmurat Tasmuradov

Sports in Uzbekistan includes sports that are played worldwide, such as football, boxing, wrestling, futsal, and judo, as well as sports that originate in the country such as kurash, which is a type of upright wrestling, belbogli kurash, turon, and boyqurgan. Uzbekistan has hosted the 2024 FIFA Futsal World Cup.

== Olympics ==
Since its independence in 1991, Uzbekistan has taken part in the Summer Olympics and Winter Olympics with increasing success. Uzbekistan has competed four times at the Summer Olympics, collecting one gold medal and five bronze medals in boxing, two gold medals and two silver medals in wrestling, and a silver medal in judo. Uzbekistan's only medal at the Winter Olympics was a gold medal in cross-country skiing in 1994. In the 2016 Rio Olympics Ruslan Nurudinov won gold in the men's 105 kg weightlifting, lifting a total of 431 kg, including an Olympic record 237 kg in the clean & jerk.

Uzbek athletes were particularly successful at the 2021 Olympic games in Tokyo. The country won three gold medals: Ulugbek Rashitov in Taekwondo, Akbar Djuraev in Weightlifting and Bakhodir Jalolov in Boxing. Uzbek gymnast Oxana Chusovitina also competed in her 8th Olympic games under the Uzbek flag at the event.

== Football ==
Football is the most popular sport in Uzbekistan. Uzbekistan's premier football league is the Uzbek League. The team with the most championships is FC Pakhtakor Tashkent with sixteen titles. The current Player of the Year (2025) is Eldor Shomurodov.

The most successful football clubs in Uzbekistan are FC Bunyodkor, FC Pakhtakor and FC Nasaf. In 2011, FC Nasaf won AFC Cup and became the first Uzbekistan team to win the international club cup. Uzbek clubs previously participated in the now-defunct, formerly annual CIS Cup.

Uzbekistan U-16 won AFC U-16 Championship in 2012. In 2018 Uzbekistan U-23 became the champions in AFC U-23 Championship hosted by China. Uzbekistan national team's best achievement at the Asian Cup was a fourth-place finish at the 2011 AFC Asian Cup.

Ravshan Irmatov was named The Best Referee in Asia in four consecutive years (2008, 2009, 2010, 2011 and 2014). At Globe Soccer Awards in 2015 he was rewarded as Best Referee of The Year.

The Bunyodkor Stadium has a capacity of 34,000, and is mostly used for football matches.

Uzbekistan's national team qualified for the 2026 FIFA World Cup, their first qualification.

== Basketball ==
Uzbekistan used to be part of the powerful Soviet Union national basketball team. After the dissolution of the team, Uzbekistan founded its own team which was moderately successful between the mid-90s and mid-2000s.

== Ice hockey ==
Uzbekistan used to be part of the Soviet Union national ice hockey team. Humo Tashkent, a professional ice hockey team was established in 2019, with the aim of joining Kontinental Hockey League (KHL). Humo play their games at the Humo Ice Dome costing over €175 million; both the team and arena derive their name from the mythical Huma bird, a symbol of happiness and freedom.

Humo Tashkent was a member of the reformed Uzbekistan Ice Hockey League which began play in February 2019. The UIHL consisted of three other teams Binokor Tashkent, HK Tashkent, & Semurg Tashkent, with all of the teams playing out of the Humo Ice Dome. Semurg became the champions in the playoffs.

Uzbekistan Hockey Federation (UHF) joined the International Ice Hockey Federation (IIHF) as a member in 2019. The men's national team recently qualified for the IIHF Division III in Hong Kong.

== Rugby union ==
Uzbekistan used to be part of the Soviet Union national rugby union team, but since its independence in 1991, Uzbekistan has created its own national team.

== Handball ==
Handball is one of Uzbekistan's most popular sports. However, much remains to be achieved by Uzbekistan at International level.

== Futsal ==
Futsal is one of Uzbekistan's most popular sports. The national futsal team qualified for the FIFA Futsal World Cup three times. They also qualified in the AFC Futsal Asian Cup 15 times and finished 2nd four times. Uzbekistan hosted the 2024 FIFA Futsal World Cup, the first time that the country has hosted a FIFA tournament. Uzbekistan women's national futsal team has been playing since 2005.

== Water polo ==
Uzbekistan's women's national under-20 water polo team qualified to the 2021 FINA Junior Water Polo World Championships.

== Chess ==
Uzbekistan scored a surprise win at the 2022 chess olympiad held in Chennai, India. The Uzbek team was undefeated, beating the higher-seeded Armenian and Dutch teams, and drawing the top seeds India and USA. The Uzbek team proved their staying power by placing second at the world team championships held at Jerusalem in November 2022. Uzbekistan's top player, Nodirbek Abdusattorov is the current world champion of rapid chess, winning the 2021 rapid world championship in a playoff against Russian grandmaster Ian Nepomniachtchi. Javokhir Sindarov won the 2026 Candidates Tournament in Cyprus.

== Notable athletes ==
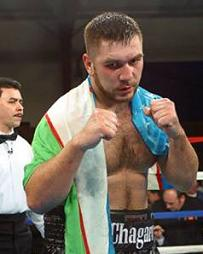
Ruslan Chagaev

- Djamolidine Abdoujaparov, cyclist
- Artur Taymazov, wrestler
- Ruslan Chagaev, boxer
- Lina Cheryazova, freestyle skier
- Elvira Saadi, gymnast
- Maksim Shatskikh, footballer
- Nodirbek Abdusattorov, chess player
- Abdukodir Khusanov, footballer

== Also See ==
- Kurash
