= Sport in Lithuania =

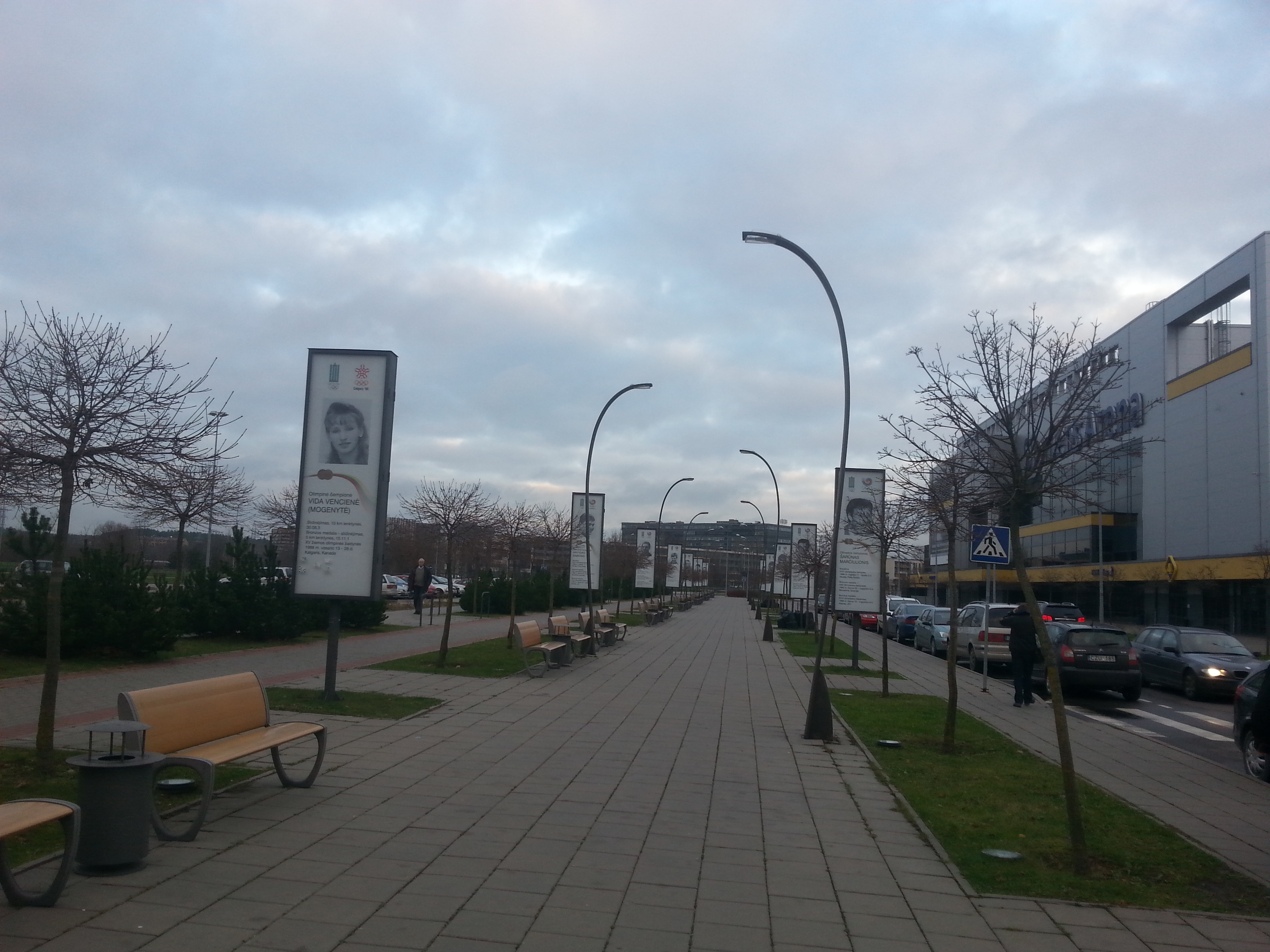
Olympic Glory Alley in Vilnius

Sport in Lithuania is governed by the Physical Education and Sports Department following the country's independence from the Soviet Union in 1990. The Lithuanian government established the department to manage physical education in the schools and sports administration in the country. Over the next few years, Lithuanian sports organizations established (or re-established) membership in international governing bodies (including the International Olympic Committee). Lithuania participated in the Winter Olympics in Albertville and has participated in every Winter and Summer Olympics since.

There are nearly 80 Olympic and non-Olympic sports federations in Lithuania, and the Lithuanian Union of Sports Federations was founded in 1993 to unite them. An organization, "Sports for All", was established to promote physical education and a healthy lifestyle for all Lithuanians.

Among the most popular sports in Lithuania are basketball, football, athletics and cycling. Professional athletes and trainers are educated at the Lithuanian Academy of Physical Education.

== Major sports ==
=== Basketball ===
Basketball is the most popular and successful team sport in Lithuania. Luke Winn, a writer for the American magazine Sports Illustrated, said in an August 2011 story:

"Basketball is the only sport the 3.2 million Lithuanians truly care about—it is their second religion, after Catholicism—and their success is proportionately stunning."

The Lithuanian national basketball team won the European basketball Championship in 1937, 1939 (when it was the host country) and 2003. They won silver medals in 1995, 2013 and 2015, bronze in 2007, and again hosted EuroBasket 2011. They were the bronze medal winners in the 2010 FIBA World Championship, which was one of the biggest underdog stories of the team, beating Spain, France, Argentina and Serbia in the bronze medal match while eventually being only defeated once, in the semifinal against Team USA.

In Olympic competition, Lithuania was the bronze medalist at the 1992, 1996, and 2000 Summer Olympics. The team finished fourth in 2004 (although it defeated Team USA in the group stage, it then lost the bronze medal game against them) and 2008.

Lithuania's under-19 junior basketball team won the European Championship in 2003 and took second place at the World Championship that year. The U-17 team has won bronze in 2016 world championship. Its under-21 junior team won the 2005 World Championship in Argentina.

BC Žalgiris, based in Kaunas, is the most successful basketball club in Lithuania. The team won the Intercontinental Cup in 1986, EuroCup in 1998 and the EuroLeague in 1999. In 2018, the club after 19 years has reached the Euroleague Final Four again, reaching the 3rd place. Lietuvos rytas, in Vilnius, won the ULEB Cup (now known as the EuroCup) in 2005 and 2009, and was runner-up in 2007.

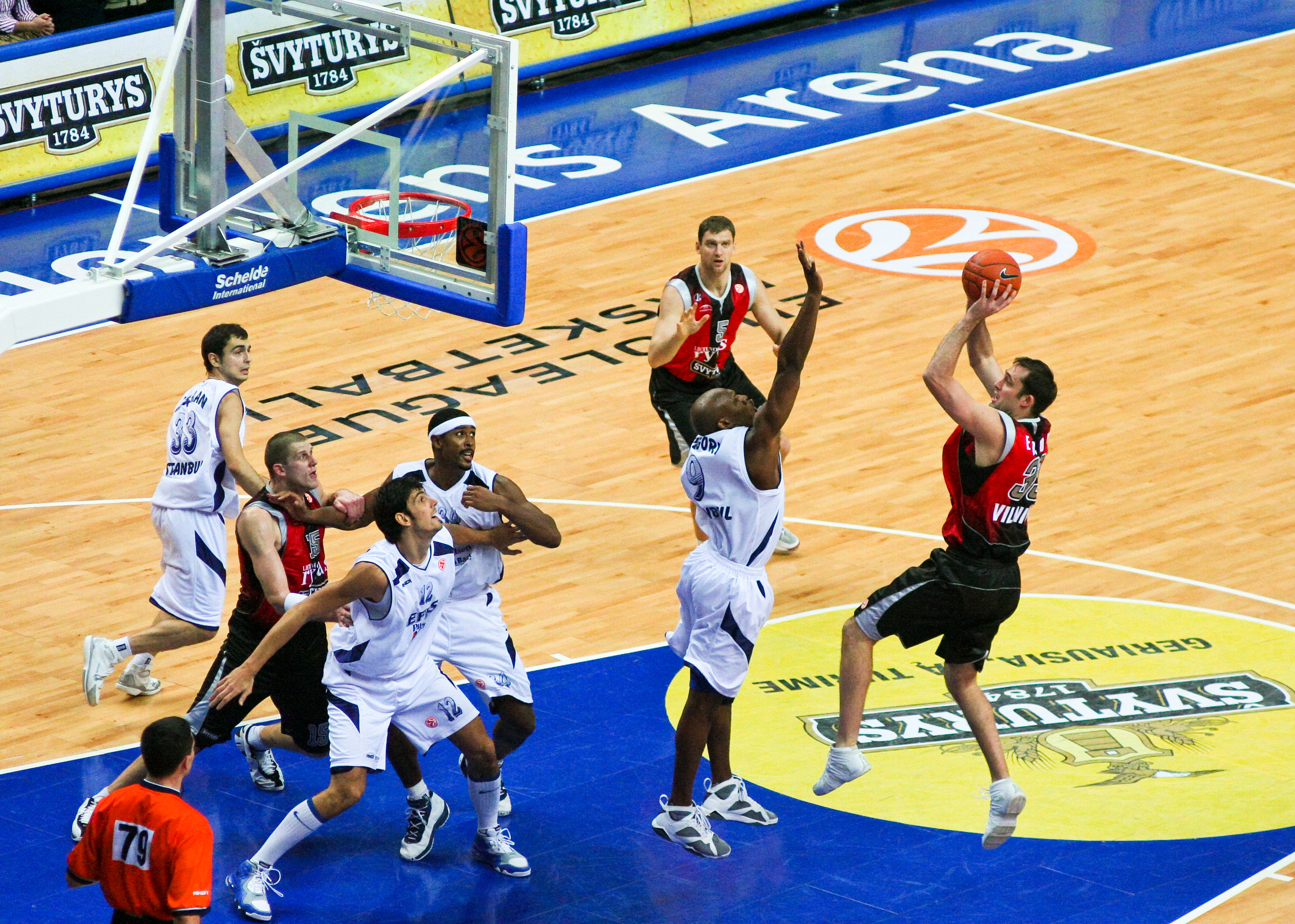
Euroleague match between BC Lietuvos rytas and Efes Pilsen

In the EuroLeague, Šarūnas Jasikevičius was a four-time EuroLeague winner and Arvydas Macijauskas, Ramūnas Šiškauskas, Arvydas Sabonis were Euroleague MVPs. Several Lithuanian basketball players have played successfully in the NBA:

- Arvydas Sabonis (Portland Trail Blazers, 1995–2001, 2002–03)
- Šarūnas Marčiulionis (Golden State Warriors and other teams, 1989–1997)
- Žydrūnas Ilgauskas (Cleveland Cavaliers and Miami Heat)
- Darius Songaila (Philadelphia 76ers)
- Linas Kleiza (Denver Nuggets and Toronto Raptors)
- Jonas Valančiūnas (New Orleans Pelicans)
- Donatas Motiejūnas (San Antonio Spurs)
- Domantas Sabonis (Sacramento Kings)
- Mindaugas Kuzminskas (Olimpia Milano)

Previously Lithuania ranked fourth in the FIBA World Rankings and putting this in perspective, Luke Winn wrote that Lithuania was at the time

"...behind countries of 313 million (the U.S.), 47 million (Spain), 40 million (Argentina) and 11 million (Greece), and just ahead of countries of 79 million (Turkey) and 61 million (Italy).

On 19 December 2022 Kaunas was announced as a host city for the 2023 EuroLeague Final Four, the first in Lithuania's sports history.

=== Football ===
The Lithuanian national Football team reached its highest rating to date (number 37) in October 2008. From the beginning of the independent Lithuanian state (from 1919 until the Soviet occupation), "sport" was equivalent to "Football". Football players were the first athletes to participate in international competitions (notably, the 1924 Olympic Games in Paris and 1938 World Cup qualifying matches. During the period of Soviet occupation, Football remained popular because of FK Žalgiris success in the Soviet Union league and European tournaments. After independence, the national team was the closest to qualifying to a major tournament in the 1998 World Cup qualifiers, reaching 3rd place in the group. At the club level, no Lithuanian team has yet reached the group stage of the UEFA Champions League or the UEFA Europa League, although FK Žalgiris, FK Sūduva, FK Ekranas and FBK Kaunas came close, reaching the Europa League play-off round multiple times. In 2022, however, Žalgiris became the first Lithuanian club to play in the group stage of a UEFA club competition after qualifying for the 2022–23 UEFA Europa Conference League, where it was drawn against Basel, Slovan Bratislava and Pyunik. The club finished fourth in Group H with five points.

Lithuanian Football players who have been successful in major European Football leagues include:

- Edgaras Jankauskas – Winner of the Champions League in 2004 with FC Porto
- Deividas Šemberas – Winner of the UEFA Cup in 2005 with CSKA
- Marius Stankevičius – Wing back in the Italian Serie A and Liga BBVA
- Tomas Danilevičius – All-time leading scorer on Lithuanian national team; plays for A.S. Livorno Calcio

The A Lyga ("A" League) is the top division in Lithuanian professional football. As in the rest of Europe, Lithuanians enjoy following the UEFA Champions League, the FIFA World Cup and other world-class Football tournaments.

=== Rugby ===
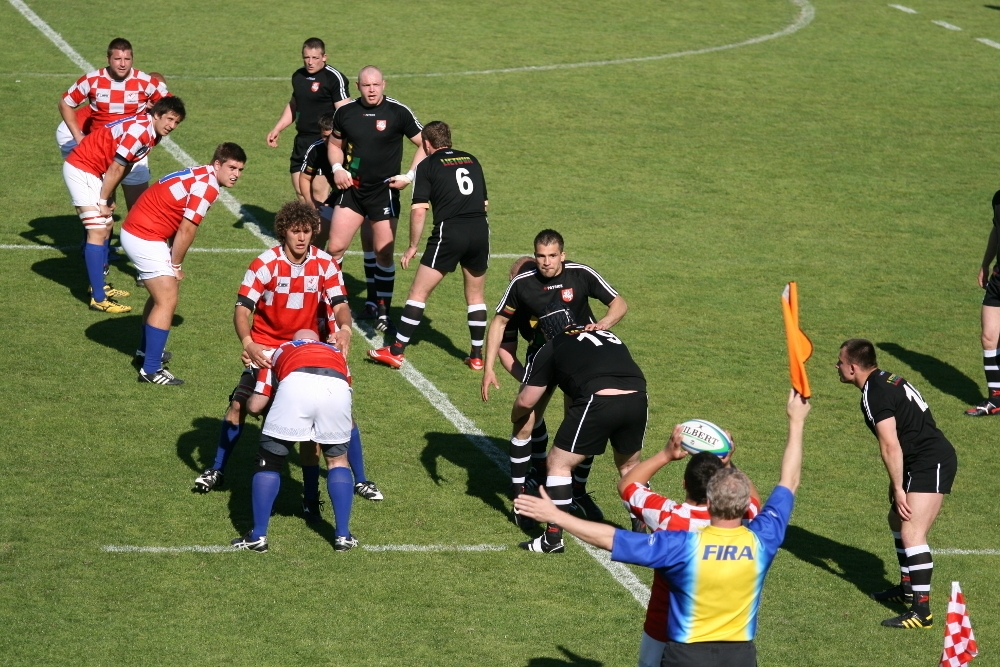
Lithuania national team versus Croatia national team

Rugby union was introduced in Lithuania during the 1960s, with teams in Kaunas and Vilnius. During last 20 years, the northern city of Šiauliai has become the capital of Lithuanian rugby, with the two strongest teams in Lithuania located there. The Šiauliai Vairas-Jupoja team are national champions, and the Šiauliai BaltRex have been runners-up for the last 10 years (except 2006). The Lithuanian national team competes in European rugby division 2A. World rugby star Laurynas Tipelis also plays for the Lithuanian national team, which holds a world record of 18 consecutive international wins. The streak began in 2006 and ended in 2010, when Lithuania lost its World Cup qualifier to higher-ranked Ukraine.

Lithuania is ranked 39th in the IRB rankings. There are 13 rugby clubs in the country, with more than 1600 players (820 seniors). Rugby sevens is also popular; the Lithuanian rugby sevens national team is a successful participant in the European championships. The Lithuanian women's rugby sevens national team is progressing from the lower tiers of the European ranks.

=== Athletics ===
Lithuanian athletes have won 11 Olympic medals, 7 at the World championships and 14 at the European Championships. The most successful Lithuanian athlete is discus thrower Virglijus Alekna, two-time Olympic gold medalist and two-time world champion. Another Olympic gold-medal discus thrower is Romas Ubartas. In recent years, Lithuanian sprinters have been on the ascendancy. In 2010 two Lithuanian sprinters, Martynas Jurgilas and Rytis Sakalauskas, set new national records for the 100-metre dash. A top woman sprinter, Lina Grinčikaitė, won gold medals at the 2009 Summer Universiade and the 2009 European Athletics U23 Championships. Lithuania also has a tradition of excellence in distance events. The most successful distance runners in recent years have been Aleksandras Antipovas and Živilė Balčiūnaitė. In addition, women heptathletes have medalled at a high level.

=== Cycling ===
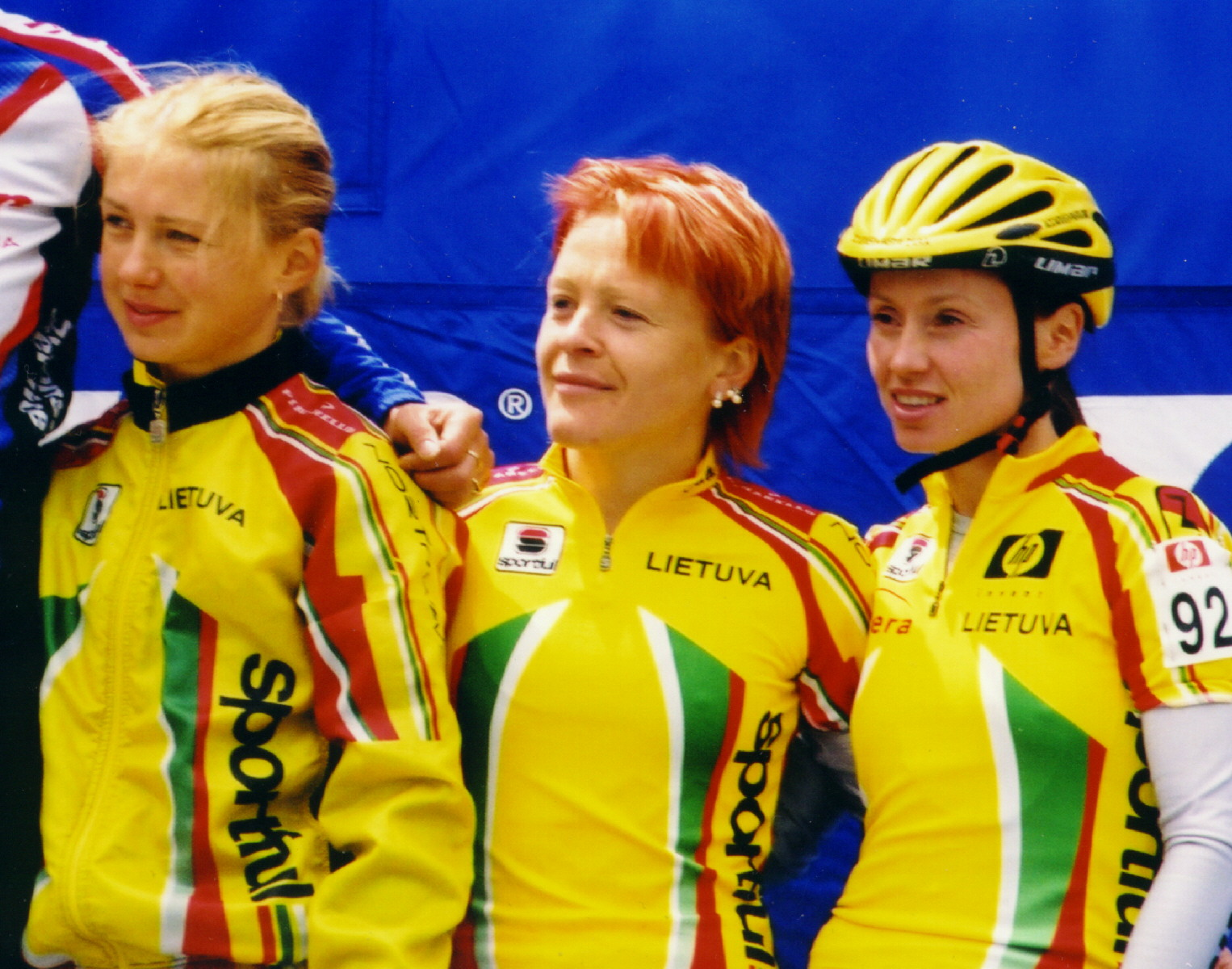
(L-R) Modesta Vžesniauskaitė, Diana Žiliūtė and Jolanta Polikevičiūtė

Lithuanian cyclists have achieved good results in prestigious cycling tours and the World Championships. The achievements of Lithuanian women cyclists are especially noteworthy. Lithuanian women made their mark on the international cycling scene beginning in 1991. Among the leaders were Zita Urbonaitė and Diana Čepelienė (who took third place in GC) in the Women's Challenge that summer.

Among the best Lithuanian cyclists were twin sisters Jolanta and Rasa Polikevičiūtė (2001 world road race champion), Edita Pučinskaitė (1999 world road race champion) and Diana Žiliūtė (1994 world junior road race champion, 1998 world road race champion and 2000 Olympic road race bronze medalist). There is a strong junior program in cycling for girls in Lithuania, culminating in an annual international race in Panevėžys. A number of young Lithuanian riders have emerged from this program (particularly Modesta Vžesniauskaitė, one of the top riders in the world).

Lithuania's women's track cycling team regularly wins medals at the world and European championships. In recent years, the most successful track cyclist has been Simona Krupeckaitė.

== Other sports ==
- Rugby League – is a brand-new sport, with the Lithuanian Rugby League Association aiming to produce pathways to develop players to play international Rugby League for their country. The fledgling Lithuanian national side played their first international friendly against Wales at Cardiff Arms Park.
- Handball - The best result of Lithuanian men's handball team is 10th place in 1997 World championship and 9th place in 1998 European championship. The team after two decades has again qualified to the 2022 European championship and reached 21st place.
- Futsal – is Lithuania's new sport as it has hosted the 2021 FIFA Futsal World Cup. This was the first time that Lithuania has ever participated in a FIFA event. Lithuania will co-host the UEFA Futsal Euro 2026 alongside Latvia.
- Ice hockey – one town, Elektrėnai, is known for ice hockey. For a long time, Elektrėnai was the only town with a large, well-equipped skating rink in Lithuania. Two NHL players – Darius Kasparaitis and Dainius Zubrus – were born in the town. Currently, Kaunas Hockey are the champions in Lithuania. The national team ranks 23rd as of 2021 in the IIHF rankings.
- Orienteering is a popular sport combining cross-country running with land-navigational skills in the woods. Variations of the sport popular in Lithuania include bicycle and ski orienteering. Orienteering in Lithuania is organized by the Lietuvos Orientavimosi Sporto Federacija.

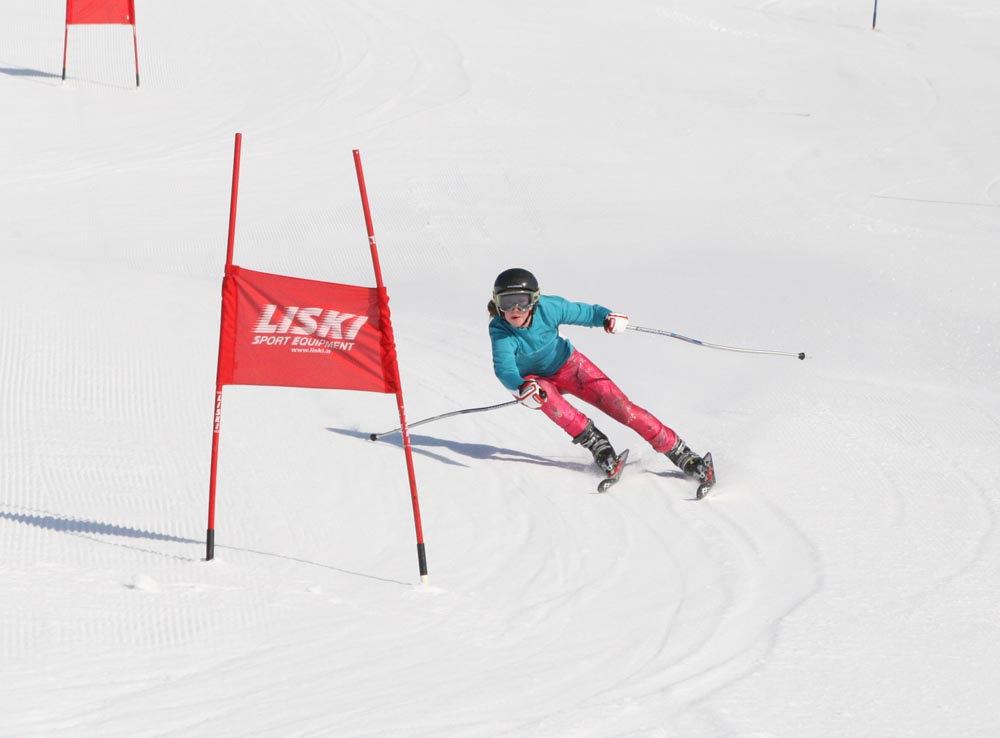
Ieva Januškevičiūtė

- Alpine skiing is also popular, and races are organized by the Lithuanian Alpine Ski Federation. There is one ski club for children, the Kalnu Ereliai Ski Club. The club accepts children from ages 4–18 in three groups: Learn To Ski, Sport Group and FIS Team. There are several ski centers, in particular the Lithuanian Winter Sports Center in Ignalina, Liepkalnis Winter Sports Centre in Vilnius, and slopes in Birstonas, Anyksciai and Alytus. In 2011, a new indoor slope opened in the spa center of Druskininkai.
- Ultimate Frisbee also has gain its popularity in Lithuania. Lithuanian flying disc sports federation (Lietuvos Skraidančio Disko Federacija.) has been established at 2004 in Vilnius. Currently in Lithuania there are over 13 Ultimate teams (clubs) from various cities. Lithuanian national Ultimate team in current World Rankings are at 20th place. Although ultimate is still young in Lithuania there are very tough teams like "Vorai", "Taškas", "Zepps".
- Tennis has become popular in recent years, as Lithuanian teams became successful in Davis Cup and Fed Cup tournaments. Ričardas Berankis reached the ATP rank #50 in May 2016.
- Swimming regained its popularity after Vytautas Janušaitis, Darius Grigalionis, Giedrius Titenis, Danas Rapsys and for women Rūta Meilutytė medalled in international competition. The city of Alytus hosts the long-course Lithuanian Swimming Championships, and the short-course championship is held in Anykščiai. Lithuanian swimmers have won four Olympic medals.
- Amateur Radio Direction Finding is a sport combining orienteering with the skills of radio direction finding. ARDF in Lithuania is organized by the Lietuvos Radijo Megeju Draugija.
- Figure skating pairs dancing is also popular in Lithuania, due to Povilas Vanagas and Margarita Drobiazko's (among others) achievements.
- Cross-country skiing is one of the most successful Olympic winter sports in Lithuania. In 2010 Winter Olympics, the cross-country ski team was the largest Lithuanian Olympic team. Vida Vencienė won an Olympic gold medal in 1988 (competing for the Soviet Union).
- Lithuania featured a women's and a men's national team in beach volleyball that competed at the 2018–2020 CEV Beach Volleyball Continental Cup.

Among other sports and pastimes, poker became an official sport in Lithuania on 20 March 2010. The Lithuanian Poker Federation was founded by well-known Lithuanian poker player Tony G. Lithuania's baseball team played a team from California's San Clemente Little League on 6 April 2010. The country is also a Federation of International Bandy member, and planned to compete in the Bandy World Championship for the first time in 2011, but has so far (2015) not taken part in the annual competition. Lithuania also has many well-known strongmen (the most successful of whom is Žydrūnas Savickas), and its modern pentathlon athletes have won medals at the Olympics and the World Championships.
