= Sport in Egypt =

Football is the most popular national sport of Egypt. The Cairo Derby is one of the fiercest derbies in Africa, and the BBC picked it as one of the 7 toughest derbies in the world. Al Ahly is the most successful club of the 20th century in the African continent according to CAF, closely followed by their rivals Zamalek SC. Squash and tennis are other popular sports in Egypt. Egypt has also won in the African Men's Handball Championship nine times, being the best team in Africa.

== History ==
=== Ancient era ===
The pharaoh's athletic capabilities were one of the central motifs of ancient Egyptian society. Sport was believed to foster ties to the divine, with board games discovered on the roofs of temples, as well as increase collaboration in society.

There were sporting exchanges between Egypt and Greco-Roman cultures as well, due to their Mediterranean proximity. During the period of Hellenistic and early Roman rule in Egypt, Greek sport became a legal requirement for elites.

=== Modern era ===
In the 1930s and 1940s, Egypt was a powerhouse in weightlifting, boxing, and wrestling with several Olympic and world championship medals. However, the last time they won a medal in boxing was in 1960.

Roller hockey is also a popular sport in Egypt. The Egyptian national roller hockey team has taken part in many world competitions, but didn't win any as of now.

Egypt featured a national team in beach volleyball that competed at the 2018–2020 CAVB Beach Volleyball Continental Cup in both the women's and the men's section.

== Team sports ==
=== Basketball ===
Egypt enjoyed a prominent era in international basketball during the late 1940s and early 1950s, winning bronze at EuroBasket 1947, gold at EuroBasket 1949, and gold at the inaugural 1951 Mediterranean Games, drawing heavily on domestic Cairo clubs such as Maccabi Cairo.

=== Football ===
Football is the most popular sport in Egypt, many Egyptians gather around to watch various Egyptian clubs and the Egyptian national football team play on an almost daily basis. Around 60% of the Egyptians are football fans.

Zamalek and Al Ahly are amongst the most popular in the country, both of which are based in Cairo. Both teams compete in the Egyptian Premier League, the highest tier of Egyptian football. These two teams compete in the Cairo Derby. Other notable teams include: Ismaily, Al-Masry, Al Ittihad.

=== Squash ===
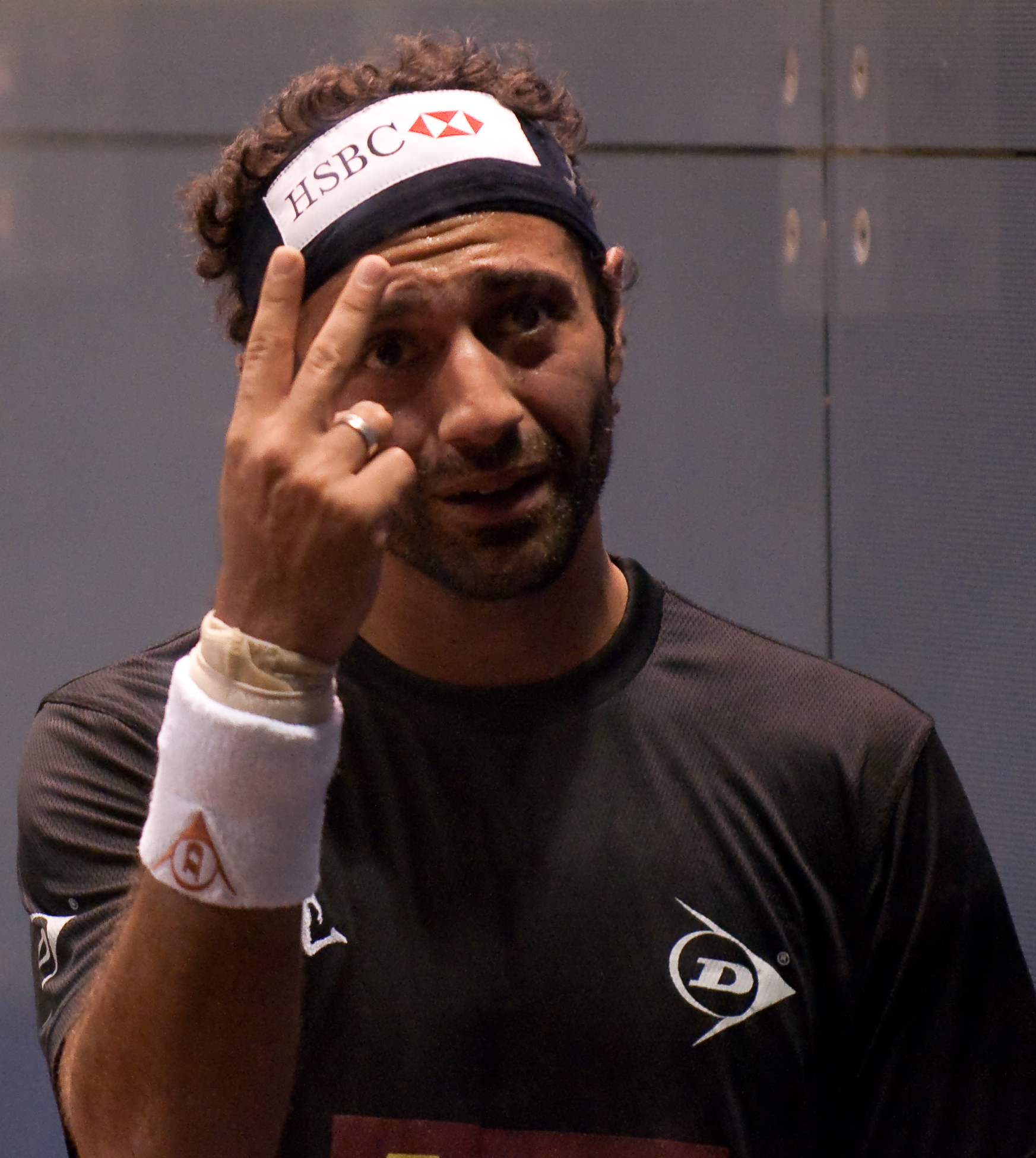
Former world number one Amr Shabana

Squash is a popular sport in Egypt. The country has been producing top players since the 1930s, and it is believed that former president Hosni Mubarak, a keen player himself, gave the sport a major boost in the 1990s. It has also been said that the current success is the result of an investment in the sport of Egyptian society as a whole.
