= Basketball in Lithuania =

- Country: Lithuania
- Governing body: Lithuanian Basketball Federation
- National teams: Lithuania men's national basketball team Lithuania women's national basketball team
- Nickname: The Second Religion
- First played: 1919
- Clubs: 162 (Men)

National competitions
- King Mindaugas Cup (men); Queen's Cup (women)

Club competitions
- Lietuvos krepšinio lyga (men's first-tier); Nacionalinė krepšinio lyga (men's second-tier); Regioninė krepšinio lyga (men's third-tier); Moterų Lietuvos Krepšinio Lyga (women's first-tier in Division A and second-tier in Division B)

International competitions
- FIBA EuroBasket; FIBA Basketball World Cup; EuroLeague; EuroCup; Basketball Champions League; Baltic Basketball League

Basketball is the most popular sport in Lithuania. During public opinion polls in Lithuania, citizens regularly describe basketball as their priority interest sport. Research in 2015 indicated that nearly 41% of the population in Lithuania watched the EuroBasket 2015 final between Lithuania and Spain. The final became the most watched event of the 21st century in Lithuania. The popularity of basketball among Lithuanians led to it being nicknamed as the "second religion" in Lithuania. The Day of Basketball is commemorated annually in Lithuania on April 23.

In the 1930s, Lithuanian-American basketball coaches and players helped the Lithuania men's national basketball team win the last EuroBasket tournaments prior to World War II in 1937 and 1939. These events caused an increase in the popularity of basketball in Lithuania.

Following the country's occupation by the Soviet Union during World War II, Lithuanian players frequently competed with the Soviet men's national team. Lithuanian locals supported BC Žalgiris, particularly against Russian teams. After Lithuania's independence from the Soviet Union in 1990, the national team won a bronze medal in the 1992 Olympics. Lithuania has since won two more bronze medals at the Olympics, a bronze medal at the 2010 FIBA World Championship, and five EuroBasket medals, including the country's third title at FIBA EuroBasket 2003 in Sweden.

Professional basketball in Lithuania is governed by the FIBA-affiliated Lithuanian Basketball Federation. The system includes three men's leagues that employ promotion and relegation, most notably the LKL, and a women's league.

The club BC Žalgiris won the EuroLeague in 1999 and the FIBA Saporta Cup in 1998. BC Žalgiris was also the FIBA Intercontinental Cup champion in 1986 under Soviet occupation. BC Lietuvos Rytas of Vilnius won the EuroCup twice in 2005 and 2009.

As of March 2025, the Lithuania men's national basketball team is ranked 10th in the FIBA Men's World Ranking. Previously, in 2015, it was ranked third below the United States' and Spain's men's national basketball teams. As of 2023, a total of 18 Lithuanian basketball players were recognized as the Lithuanian Sportsman of the Year.

While women were the first to start playing basketball in Lithuania, the women's national team has not achieved the same success as the men's national team. However, they have won a title at EuroBasket Women 1997.

The Lithuanian Basketball Player of the Year awards are given annually for men and women, while Jonas Valančiūnas (seven times) and Gintarė Petronytė (seven times) received the most such honors.

== History ==
=== Interwar period (1920–1940) ===
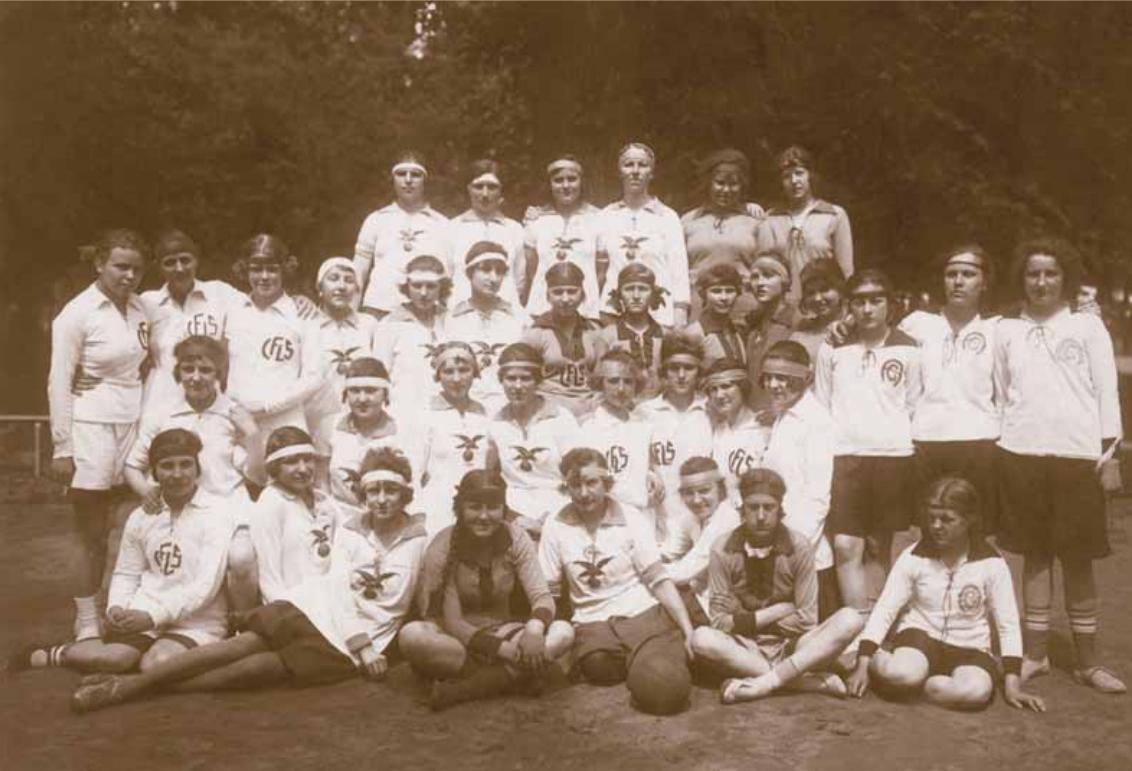
One of the very first women basketball players in Lithuania in 1923

Basketball was first introduced in Lithuania indirectly through the European variety of netball by the Germans. Lithuanian women athletes started organizing a team in 1919. In 1920–1921, the game was played in public. The female pioneerism of basketball in Lithuania was initiated by Elena Kubiliūnaitė-Garbačiauskienė. She learned about basketball from Riga's football team members, through which she became acquainted with James Naismith's basketball rules. She then brought the rules from Riga to Lithuania's temporary capital Kaunas in 1921 and translated them into the Lithuanian language. Women since 1921 played basketball in a self-made court at the Vytautas Park in Kaunas. Because women were the first to play basketball in Lithuania, basketball's widespread popularity was not very high until the 1930s as it was considered a women's sport. In her memoirs, Garbačiauskienė recalled that "it was not easy to spread the ideals of sports in a war-weary homeland trampled under the boots of foreign armies, and no one thought about physical education, let alone women's sports". In 1922, Karolis Dineika released the book Krepšiasvydis vyrams (English: Basketball for men), and in 1926 Steponas Darius published the first basketball rules in Lithuania. Garbačiauskienė had planned to publish the rules of basketball in Lithuania herself, however, due to the lack of funds and a lack of interest in women's sports, she transferred the authorship to Darius.

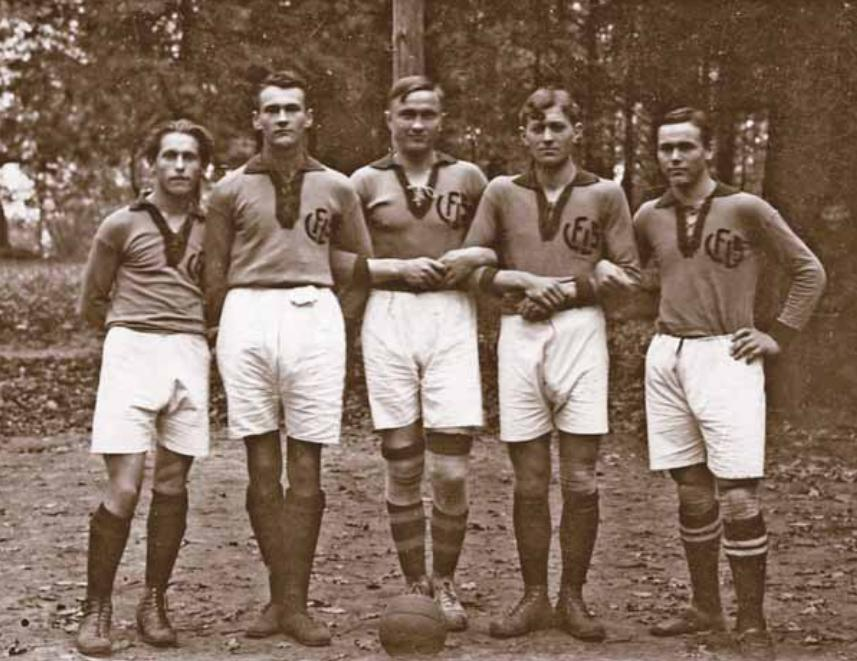
Lietuvos Fizinio Lavinimo Sąjunga (LFLS) had one of the first male basketball teams in Lithuania, back in 1923. Steponas Darius in the middle.

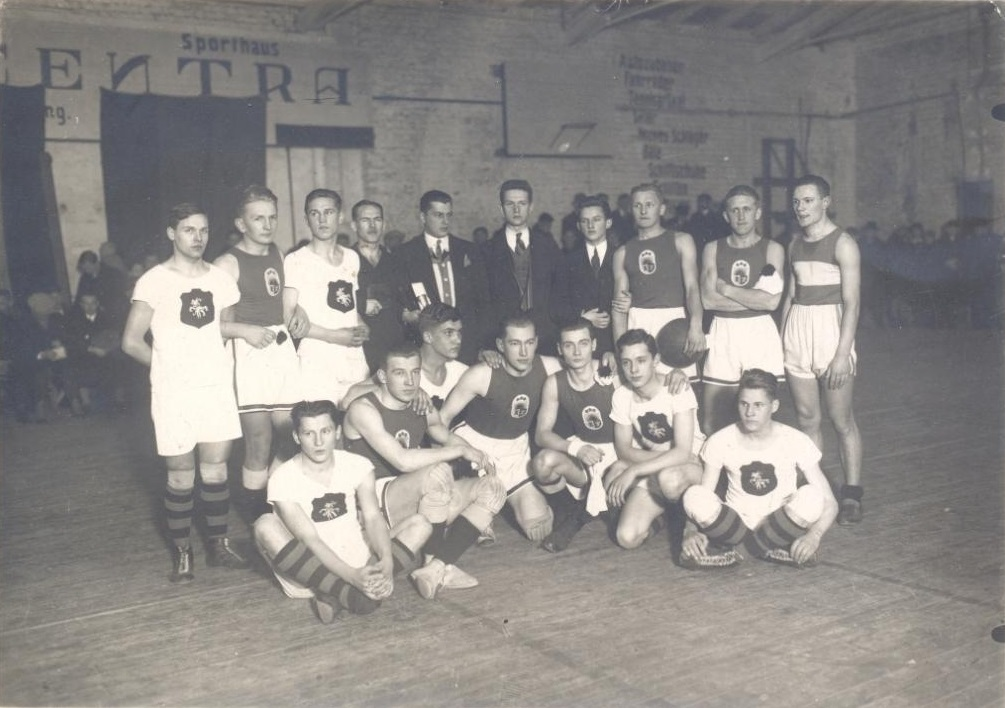
Lithuania men's national basketball team before or after its first international game versus Latvia men's national basketball team in 1925.

Despite the fact that women were the first basketball players in Lithuania, the first official game was played by men. Steponas Darius worked as a basketball instructor in physical education classes in 1922 initially. After that, the first official basketball game was played in Lithuania on 23 April 1922 when Lietuvos Fizinio Lavinimo Sąjunga (English: Lithuanian Physical Education Union) played a game versus the Kaunas team, winning 8–6. That day is regarded as the beginning of basketball in Lithuania. In 1922, the first Lithuanian women's basketball tournament in Lithuania was organized. In 1924, the first Lithuanian men's basketball tournament in Lithuania was organized, featuring two teams from LFLS and one from Lietuvos Dviračių Sąjunga (English: Lithuanian Cycles Union), and a course for basketball referees was held. The first class was taught by Elena Kubiliūnaitė-Garbačiauskienė and Steponas Darius. On 13 December 1925, Lithuania men's national basketball team played its first international game in Riga, where they lost 41–20 to the Latvia men's national basketball team.

Physical Culture Palace in 1938

From 1926 to 1933, the popularity of basketball became overshadowed by that of football. Basketball was played only during the summer period because there was no suitable indoor arena, and the game was mostly played by players of other sports who allocated little time to it. The number of games played decreased, and the national championship was not contested between 1929 and 1932. The Physical Culture Palace, which opened in Kaunas on 10 October 1934, had a hall that was built for tennis which had cork flooring; since the flooring was suitable for indoor basketball, the Hall hosted its first game on 16 November 1934 and soon became a main center for basketball events.

In 1935, Lithuania decided to hold a World Lithuanian Congress in the temporary capital of Kaunas. The Lithuanian American community of Chicago sponsored a team of athletes to participate in this Congress, including a basketball team. After the three-week congress, Juozas Žukas and Konstantinas Savickas stayed to teach basketball to Lithuanians. Savickus, in particular, became a player-coach to the national team, which was recently defeated by Latvia 123–10 in an exhibition game. One year later, with Savickus leading the team and exploiting stalling techniques, Lithuania scored 14–7 at halftime before losing 31–10. The Lithuanian press declared it a moral victory.

Also, in 1936, the Lithuania Ball Game Union Basketball Committee applied to become a member of the FIBA in order to participate in international tournaments, including EuroBasket 1937, and was granted a FIBA membership in 1936. While basketball became an Olympic sport at the 1936 Summer Olympics in Berlin, Lithuania decided not to take part in the tournament in favor of preparing for the following year. During the Olympics, one of the gold medalists, Frank Lubin, was of Lithuanian heritage, and was invited to visit the Baltic nation by a Lithuanian official in attendance. Going by the Lithuanian name Pranas Lubinas, he spent six months in Lithuania as a basketball coach. Filling in for Savickus, who had returned to Chicago, Lubinas led Lithuania to its first victory over Latvia, 36–25.

"Physical Culture Palace director Mr. Augustauskas asked me: Could you win the European championship? I replied: Why not? Lithuanians already made significant progress and with one or two athletes from Chicago we could easily win that championship."

— Konstantinas Savickas, describing his first efforts to improve basketball in Lithuania.

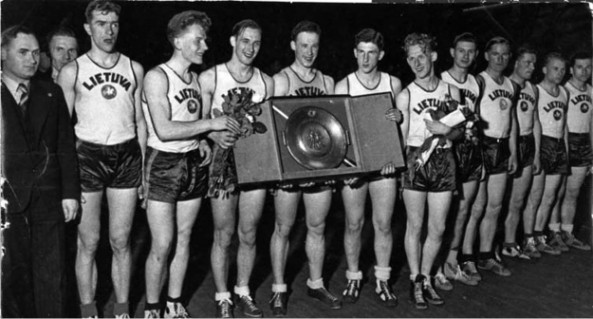
Lithuania men's national team members holding the Latvia's President Kārlis Ulmanis presidential prize of the EuroBasket 1937

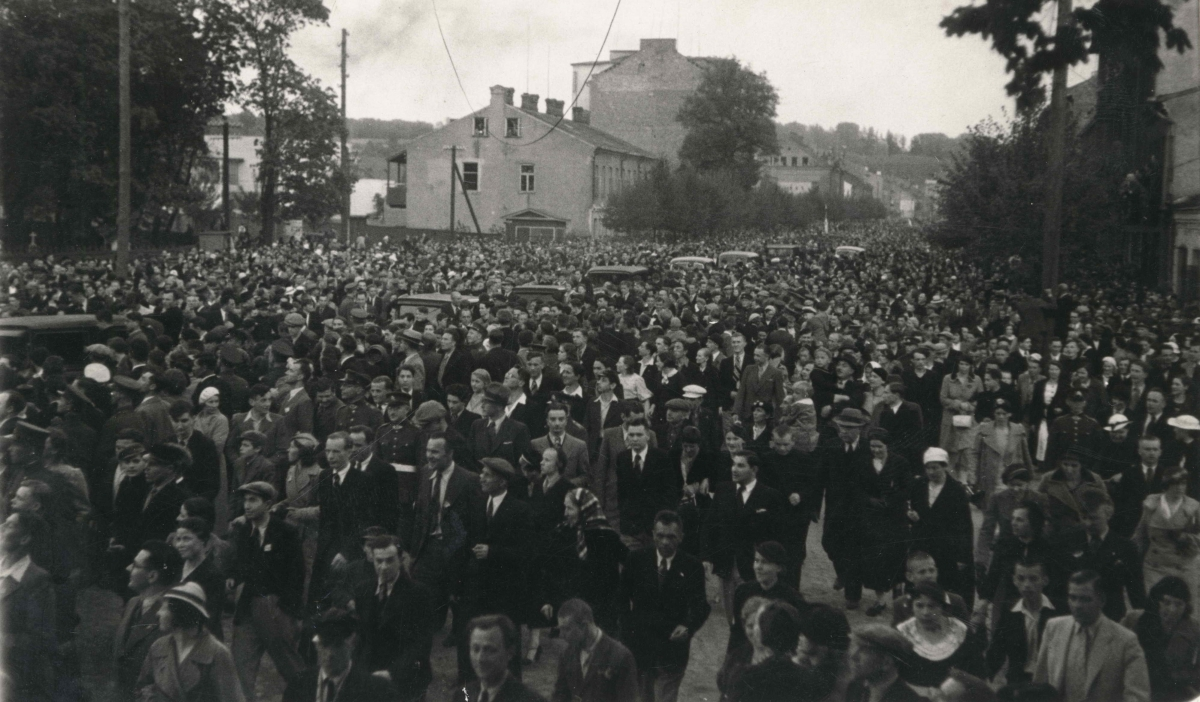
Welcoming of the EuroBasket 1937 champions in Kaunas

The preparations for EuroBasket 1937 started slowly, with players training only 4 hours a week. At first, it was decided that the national team at the tournament would not include any Lithuanian Americans; however, the decision was reversed with only one month remaining once the Latvian newspaper Sporto pasaule printed an article which considered Lithuania to be the weakest of all contestants. Lithuanian basketball player Leonas Baltrūnas, along with journalist Jonas Narbutas, used a translated version of the article to request the inclusion of Lithuanian Americans to Vytautas Augustauskas, the director of the Physical Culture Palace. Augustauskas finished reading the presented article and asked whether two Lithuanian American players would be enough, to which Baltrūnas replied, "we only need a center and one good guard". After a telegram was sent to the United States, Pranas Talzūnas and Feliksas Kriaučiūnas arrived one month prior to the tournament, the latter of whom was designated as a player-coach. To keep the secret on how Lithuanian Americans were strengthening the team's performance, all preparation games were cancelled and practices were held in private. Once the reinforcements were made public, opponents were skeptical, with Talzūnas later remembering that other teams felt that he and Kriaučiūnas were not the best players as "everyone thought that a good player must be tall, raising his hand and dunking into the basket." In 1937, Lithuania became the champions of Europe for the first time (finished undefeated with a record 5–0), with Talzūnas being picked as the tournament's most valuable player.

The 1937 Lithuania men's national team was congratulated by thousands of people in each Lithuanian train station they passed through and upon arrival in Kaunas by the Lithuanian government at the Physical Culture Palace, including by Prime Minister Juozas Tūbelis and President Antanas Smetona. The 1937 Lithuania men's national team members were the first Lithuanian sportsmen awarded with the state medals and orders of Lithuania (medals and orders of Vytautas the Great) personally by Smetona. Furthermore, as a result of the success in EuroBasket 1937, basketball's popularity increased in Lithuania.

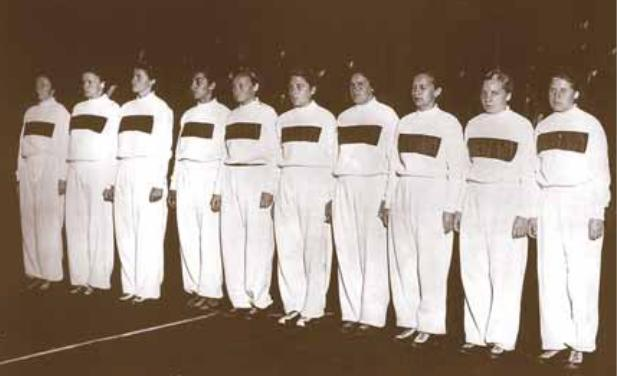
Lithuania women's national team during the EuroBasket Women 1938 in Rome, Italy

Kriaučiūnas also coached the Lithuania women's national basketball team, which in 1938 played its first international game versus the Estonia women's national basketball team (won 15–7) and later was successful in the first European women's basketball championship, the EuroBasket 1938 Women, which was organized in Rome, Italy. With three victories in four games, Lithuania finished second behind Italy, who hosted the tournament. Furthermore, Lithuania defeated the upcoming European champions Italy 23–21, but lost a decisive game to Poland 24–21, and due to the same amount of victories between the three teams, the European champion was named by calculating the differences between the points in games where they competed. Italy's largest sports newspaper La Gazzetta dello Sport announced elections of the best 1938 European women basketball player, and 1938 Lithuania women's national team member Genovaitė Miuleraitė was selected for this title, while four other Lithuanians from the 1938 team were also selected to the top ten.

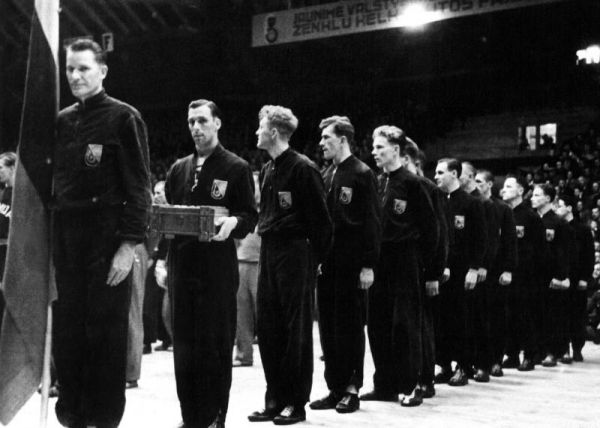
Lithuania men's national team during the closing ceremony of the EuroBasket 1939. Pranas Lubinas is holding the Lithuanian tricolor, while Feliksas Kriaučiūnas is holding a silver chest with ambers – Smetona's presidential prize to the tournament winners.

Lithuania was granted the right to organize EuroBasket 1939. President Smetona was the founder of the main prize and patron of the championship. In addition, the Kaunas Sports Hall, Europe's first dedicated basketball arena, was built for the tournament in half a year with a 11,000 capacity (3,500 seated). In the competition, a large part of the Lithuania national team's roster consisted of Lithuanian Americans, including Feliksas Kriaučiūnas, Juozas Jurgėla, Vytautas Budriūnas, Mykolas Ruzgys and Pranas Lubinas. As a result, there were several protests from other nations. Latvia and Estonia refused to play friendly games with Lithuania if Lubinas would compete, and Latvia even suggested to limit the players' height at EuroBasket 1939. According to the 1939 edition of Lithuanian magazine Trimitas, "the biggest pillar of our team was Lubinas, since 2-3 away players would run around him and protect him as best they could. However, Lubinas, being covered by the away players, did not try to shoot the ball himself, but knew how to pass the ball well to his teammates, who made the most of the opportunities. The second biggest fighter in a row was Mykolas Ruzgys, as he knew to concentrate well, is difficult to cover and shoots to the basket from various positions." Lubinas, who was the designated player-coach, led Lithuania to a second continental title, even scoring the buzzer-beater in the decisive game versus Latvia, which warranted a 37–36 victory. Lubinas narrated to the media at that time about the buzzer-beater versus Latvia as follows: "I forgot everything I knew in Lithuanian. I prayed and cursed my partners. For the love of God, give me the ball! Finally, A. Andrulis, who spoke good English, nodded and passed me the ball. I turned and scored. That shot gave us the victory 37–36. The crowd burst down to the court and carried us on their shoulders." Later, Lithuania defeated the Finland national team by 103 points (112–9) and achieved the EuroBasket record of the largest margin victory. Immediately after the final game of Lithuania versus Italy, where Lithuania won 41–27 and finished with a 7–0 record, the closing ceremony was held and the Lithuania national team was awarded with Smetona's presidential gift – a dowry chest made from silver and decorated with ambers. According to Marie-Eugène Bouge, a 1938–1945 President of the French Federation of Basketball, already at the time basketball was incredibly popular in Lithuania and the arena, which seats more than ten thousand people, was full every day during EuroBasket 1939. On 8 June 1939, another event with 4,000 spectators was held at the Kaunas Sports Hall to pay homage to the 1939 European champions during which they were awarded with Smetona's personal gifts (nominal watches) and other institutions gifts.

=== National teams dissolution during World War II ===
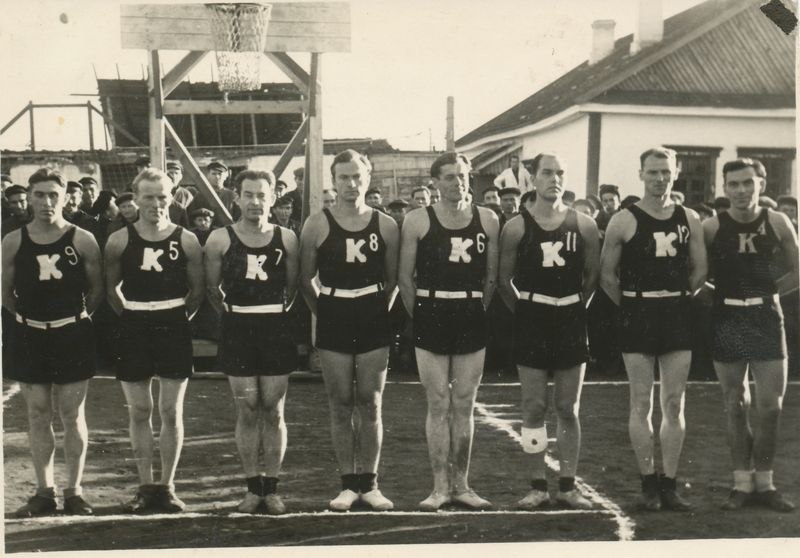
Basketball team of the Lithuanian political prisoners at Vorkutlag in 1954

After two consecutive EuroBasket titles, Pranas Lubinas intended to settle in the land of his father in the surroundings of Lukšiai in Lithuania and dreamed of leading Lithuania in the 1940 Summer Olympics. Nevertheless, it remained only a dream as the World War II broke out one year before and the Olympics were cancelled. With Nazi Germany invading Europe and the Soviet Union occupying the Baltic states in 1940, the Lithuanian basketball players and basketball-supporting president Antanas Smetona left for safer countries such as the United States and Australia. European champion Mykolas Ruzgys in 1940 had to leave his pregnant Lithuanian wife in Lithuania, he never saw her again and never met with his later born daughter. Only a few of famous interwar period Lithuanian basketball players had a chance to return to Lithuania in 1989–1990. As a consequence, none of the European champions played for the Soviet Union after the war ended. The EuroBasket Women 1940 and EuroBasket 1941 were due to take place in Lithuania as well, but were cancelled due to the war. Instead, Lithuania only hosted a Baltic states tournament organized at Kaunas Sports Hall in April 1941, beating Latvia 38–33 in front of 6000 spectators. Two months later, mass Soviet deportations from Lithuania began. Juozas Butrimas, Siberia deportations survivor, once said: "Our whole sports club was falsely accused of participating in an anti-Soviet Lithuanian resistance organization. In Siberia, we built a regulation basketball court. Basketball allowed us to have dignity, to retain our sense of humanity. How did I survived? Basketball gave a lot. They didn't bury me there".

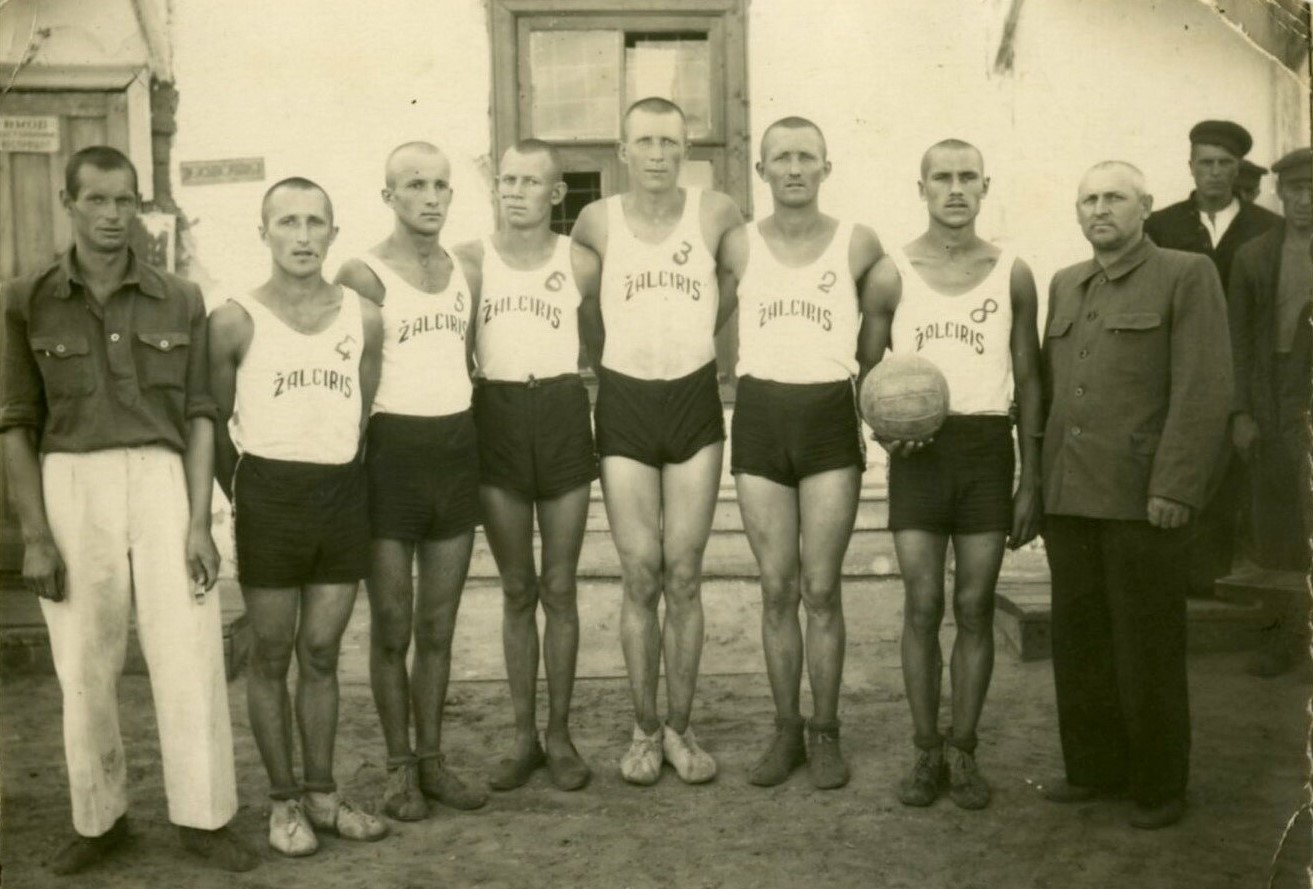
Lithuanian political prisoners with Žalgiris uniforms and a referee at the gulag of the Omsk Oblast in the Russian SFSR in 1954

During the rest of the war, with the Germans occupying Lithuania in November 1941 and the Soviets taking it back three years later, many basketballers who did not escape the country went through difficult times. Vincas Sercevičius, often nicknamed as the second Lubinas, had to run away from German raids in 1943. Two years later, Sercevičius was a member of the Žalgiris Kaunas who refused to purposefully lose to CSKA Moscow, leading him and other teammates (e.g. 1939 European champion Mindaugas Šliūpas), along with coach Stasys Šačkus (1937 European champion), to end up shipped to the Vorkuta Gulag by the Soviets. Basketball was a popular sport at the Soviet gulags among the Lithuanians and basketball clubs at the Soviet gulags were especially actively established after the death of Joseph Stalin in 1953. The Lithuanian basketball clubs were established at the Soviet gulags which were located in Komi, Mordovia, Kazakh SSR, Omsk Oblast, Irkutsk Oblast and were named with patriotic names such as Geležinis vilkas, Tauras (depicted in the coat of arms of Kaunas), Pilėnai, Žalgiris, etc. The exact number of Lithuanian basketball clubs which were established at the Soviet gulags is unknown, however there were certainly tens of them and when such clubs lacked enough Lithuanians then their teams were assembled by including Latvians and Estonians. Moreover, it is known that frequently Lithuanian basketball players at the Soviet gulags played by being exhausted from hunger and that they used to save their food rations which they subsequently shared after tournaments with others more exhausted basketball players.

=== Soviet period (1944–1990) ===
"Russia has adopted Lithuanian techniques and tactics. The last time I saw them was when I was in Prague with the French team. I wanted to cry with joy, because there were four Lithuanians in the team, and one was the captain of their national team. I spoke to Lithuanian players several times, but we couldn't communicate any longer."

— Mykolas Ruzgys, describing the Soviet squad at EuroBasket 1947 in a 1968 interview.

In 1946, the first European basketball championship after the war was held – EuroBasket 1946 in Geneva, Switzerland. Consequently, Lithuanian diplomat Stasys Antanas Bačkis, who resided in liberated France and concurrently represented the Independent Lithuania's Diplomatic Service, invited representatives of the Lithuanian diaspora to defend the Lithuania's 1939 European basketball champions title. He ordered outfits of the Lithuania men's national basketball team and the team (which was considered by many contemporary experts as the Europe's strongest) began to prepare for the EuroBasket 1946. However, the Soviet Union strictly protested against the Lithuanian national team's participation in the championship and the FIBA yielded to its pressure by not allowing the Lithuanians to independently compete in the EuroBasket 1946.

In 1947 and 1951, Lithuanian basketball club Žalgiris won the USSR Premier Basketball League.

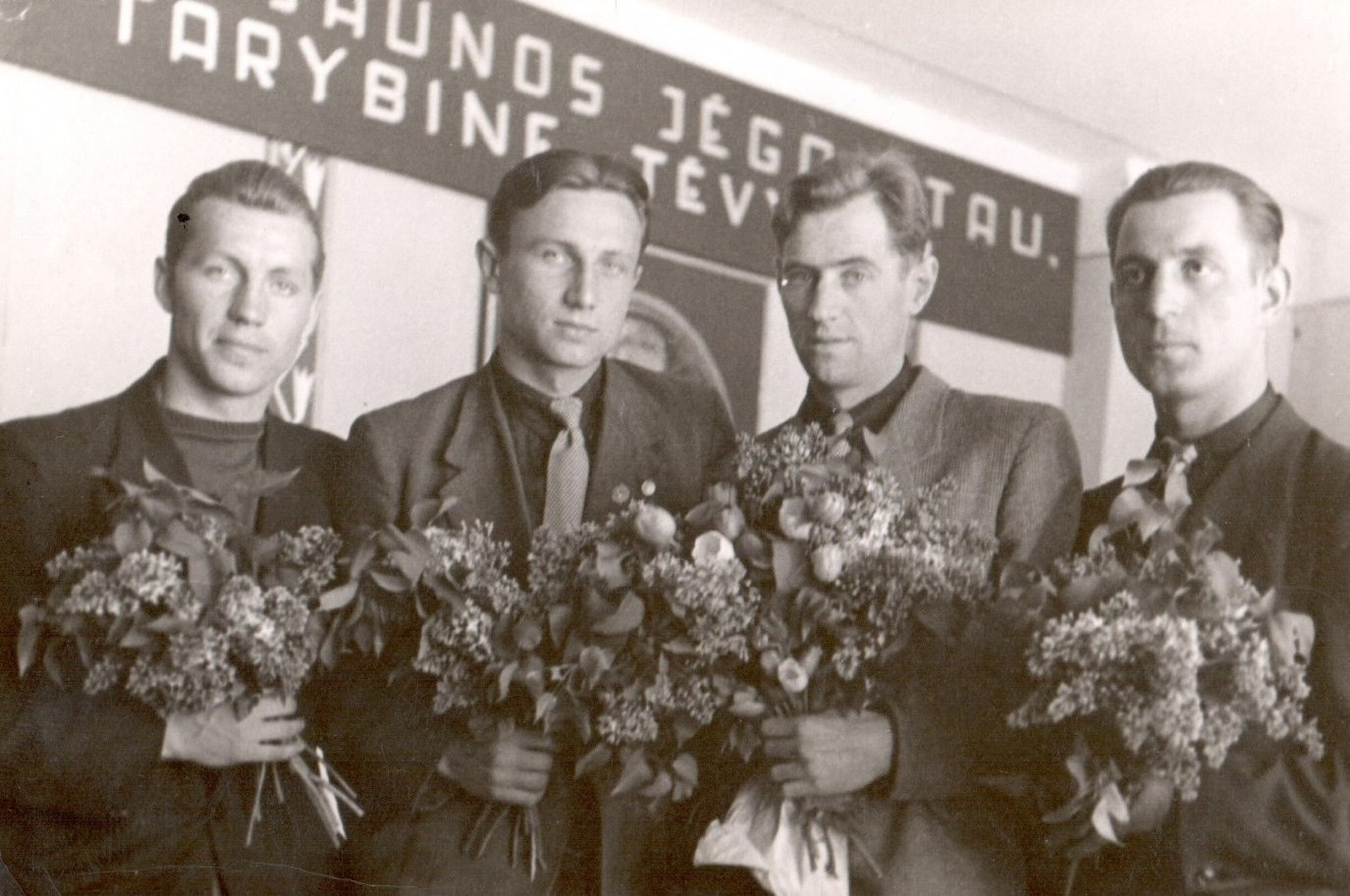
Kazys Petkevičius, Stepas Butautas, Vytautas Kulakauskas and Justinas Lagunavičius – EuroBasket 1947 champions

Kaunas Sports Hall, where the Lithuanian basketball flourished under Soviet rule

The first Soviet Union men's national basketball team was formed in 1947 to participate in EuroBasket 1947, immediately winning gold medals. The team had four Lithuanians: Stepas Butautas, Justinas Lagunavičius, Kazys Petkevičius and Vytautas Kulakauskas. In an early 1990s interview Kulakauskas described the Soviet national team by telling: "It could be said that there were the physical preparations and shootings, however all the tactics and the game-play was given to them by us. ... We gave the whole American school to them, which we received from the Lithuanian Americans." According to Lithuanian President Valdas Adamkus, who being as a kid spectated live EuroBasket 1939, basketball for the Lithuanian youth was a symbol of Lithuania's independence, no matter what color shirts the Lithuanian basketball players sometimes had to wear.

Given the Soviet Union was absent from the 1948 Summer Olympics, Lithuanian basketballers could only fulfill their dreams of playing on the Olympic stage in the 1952 Olympic Games, where they qualified by winning EuroBasket 1951. The Soviets got a silver medal, losing only two games versus the United States, who had a height advantage—the shortest of their players was still taller than the highest Soviet—and would soon become the USSR's biggest rival. The team was led by Georgian player Otar Korkia (17.3 points per game), along with Lithuanians Stepas Butautas (10.6 points) and Kazys Petkevičius (8.1 points). Two other Lithuanians, Justinas Lagunavičius and Stanislovas Stonkus, were also in the team as players, while Vytautas Kulakauskas was an assistant coach. The four, along with Victorio Cieslinskas, are regarded as the first Lithuania-born Olympic basketball players and the first Lithuania-born Olympic medalists.

Four Lithuanian players represented the Soviet national team in EuroBasket 1953: Justinas Lagunavičius, Stepas Butautas, Kazys Petkevičius, Algirdas Lauritėnas, while Vytautas Kulakauskas was an assistant coach. During the tournament the Soviet national team defeated Denmark with a margin of 104 points (118–14) and broke the EuroBasket record of the biggest margin victory, which since 1939 was held by the Lithuania national team (103 points), and eventually won gold medals by being undefeated (7–0).

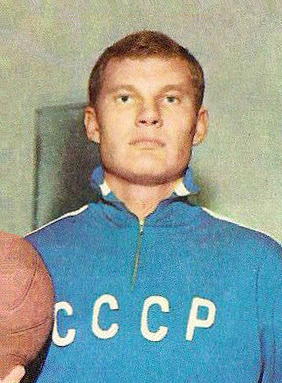
Modestas Paulauskas was one of the all-time biggest basketball stars of the Soviet Union and is the all-time most titled Lithuanian basketball player of the Olympic Games and FIBA championships

Years later, then just 20-year-old Modestas Paulauskas debuted in the Soviet Union men's basketball team during the EuroBasket 1965, led the Soviet team to a EuroBasket title and was named the FIBA EuroBasket MVP, starting in 1969 he served as the Soviet Union men's basketball team captain, and led the USSR to an historic upset of the United States in the 1972 Olympic Games, making them the first Olympic champions other than the Americans (this loss was the first-ever for the United States men's national basketball team at the Olympics). The nicknamed "Iron Modė" would often score half (e.g. over 40) points for his team even before the introduction of the three-point line. He refused to play for the PBC CSKA Moscow and stayed at Žalgiris Kaunas.

According to journalist and future LKL employee Arūnas Pakula, "We felt like an occupied nation. We had no weapons to use. The only opportunity to prove ourselves against the Soviets was in basketball." Despite not being able to challenge the Soviet Union on basketball court, Lithuanians still did that in another way. Basketball club Žalgiris Kaunas, established in 1944 (just a few years after the country's occupation) with a name commemorating the Battle of Grunwald, became one of the main non-violent resistance ways. Games between Žalgiris and CSKA Moscow, a military basketball team mostly formed from best Soviet Union basketball players, were de facto games between Lithuania and the Soviet Union, and led to mass rallies of sorts once Lithuanians went to receive Žalgiris' players at airports after victories. The teams from Baltic states even tried to help each other during the Soviet tournaments, most notably in 1973. During the last round, the already qualified Žalgiris Kaunas deliberately lost to Kalev Tallinn, as admitted by Paulauskas: "We gave victory to Tallinn Kalev. That game meant nothing for us, while for Estonians it was crucial in order to avoid the fight for the survival in the highest league".

Among the Lithuanian women who played for the Soviet Union women's national basketball team and won multiple titles with it especially notable were: Angelė Jankūnaitė-Rupšienė, Jūratė Daktaraitė, Vida Šulskytė-Beselienė, Vitalija Tuomaitė, who all in 2022 were recognized as Lithuanian basketball legends.

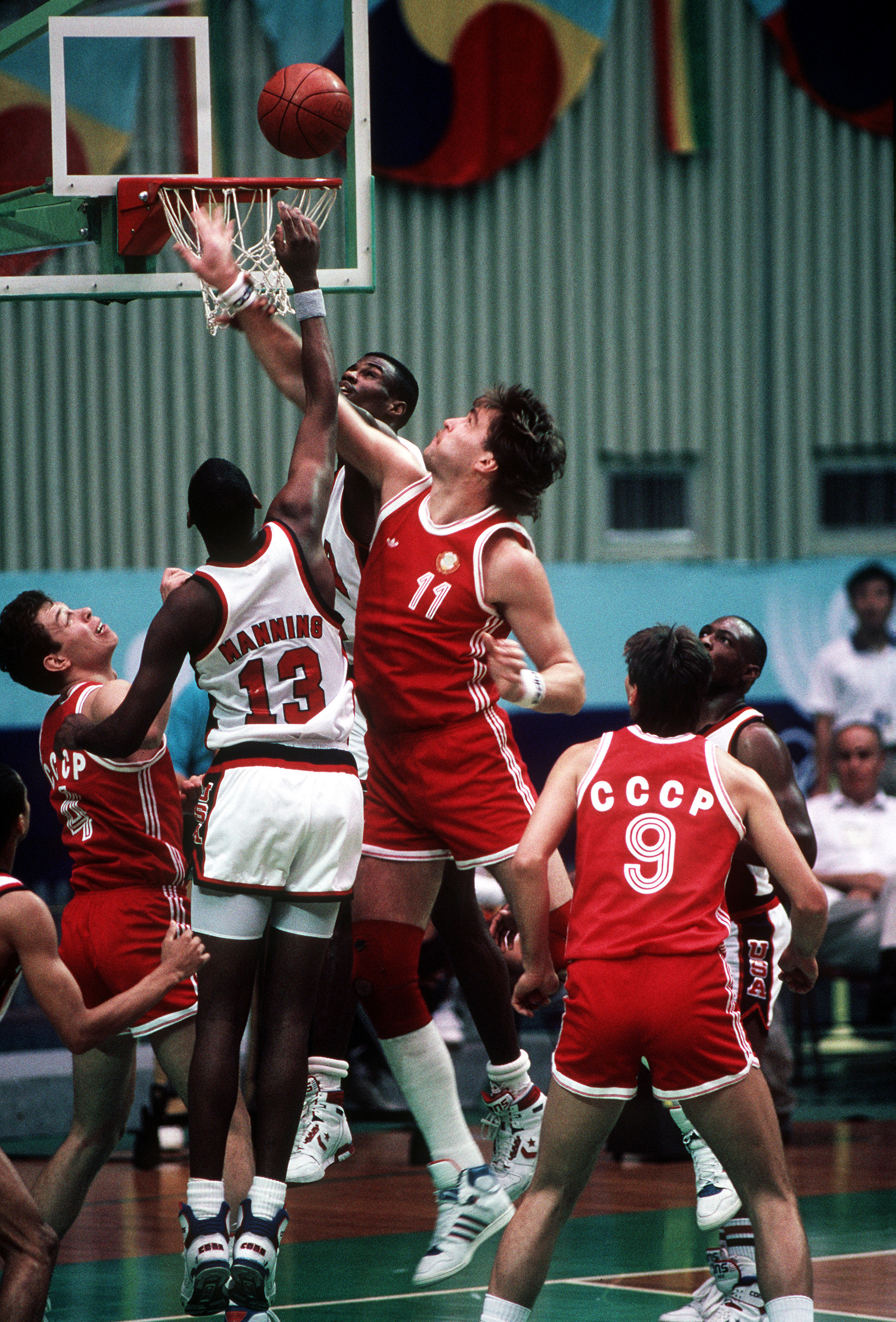
Arvydas Sabonis (#11) playing the 1988 Olympic semifinal versus the United States as a Soviet team player. Americans David Robinson and Danny Manning are near him.

During the Soviet Era of Stagnation and subsequent dissolution of the Soviet Union, the success of Lithuanian basketball provided many moments to showcase their nationalism against the Soviet dominance. The 1981 students sport games in Vilnius had the locals attending in the Lithuanian green and yellow colors to see the national youth team led by Arvydas Sabonis and Šarūnas Marčiulionis defeat the Moscow squad. In the 1980s, Žalgiris defeated CSKA three times in a row for the USSR Premier Basketball League finals (1985–1987). One of their players, Sergejus Jovaiša, stated that in 1987 CSKA was even preparing a huge celebration with orchestra and flowers before the defeat. Žalgiris also won the 1986 Intercontinental Cup in Argentina, receiving much support from the home crowd versus the Yugoslavs of Zagreb Cibona. Their return to Europe attracted a huge crowd, with Žalgiris captain Valdemaras Chomičius stating that in Aleksotas Airport "it seemed that the whole Kaunas gathered that early morning."

"When after the war the Russian squad almost defeated USA, some were congratulating me, others were reproachful as they never heard that the Russians were playing basketball. After the war they were using these Lithuanians who I once trained. They took over many techniques and tactics knowledges. I was always observing from far when basketball traditions blossomed in Lithuania and gave such international stars like Arvydas Sabonis. I was proud that the Lithuanians shined more than the others in Seoul. It was mine team. Lithuanian team defeated the Americans, I was telling to the media..."

— Pranas Lubinas, sharing his memories related to basketball in Lithuania, in a 1989 interview.

In 1988, Atlanta Hawks which included its major star Dominique Wilkins became the first NBA club to visit Lithuania and played a friendly game with the Soviet Union national team at the Vilnius Palace of Concerts and Sports. Later, the Soviet Union squad became Olympic champions in the 1988 Summer Olympics for the second and the last time, defeating the United States, 82–76, in the semi-finals and Yugoslavia 76–63 in the finals. The team mostly was led by four Lithuanians: Šarūnas Marčiulionis (18.1 points, 2.3 assists per game), Rimas Kurtinaitis (13.4 points, 3 rebounds), Arvydas Sabonis (13.3 points, 11.1 rebounds) and team captain Valdemaras Chomičius (7.4 points, 1.5 rebounds). Vytautas Landsbergis, the first head of state of Lithuania after its independence declaration from the Soviet Union, once said: "The majority of the team was made up of Lithuanians. So really Lithuania won that gold medal for the Soviet Union. But its name wasn't there. And that was another injustice that we had to correct".

The Soviet national team failed to qualify for EuroBasket 1991 following Lithuania's declaration of independence on 11 March 1990. During the 43 years where the Soviets had Lithuanian players, they managed to get with both male and female squads 17 Olympic medals (8 gold, 6 silver and 3 bronze), 17 World championship medals (11 gold, 5 silver and one bronze), and 51 EuroBasket medals (36 gold, 4 silver and 11 bronze). The occupation left many painful marks in Lithuania and Lithuanians' memory. Games between Žalgiris and CSKA, as well as games between Lithuania and Russian national teams, still have extra spice in them nowadays. Singing of the Lithuanian anthem before the professional club's games in Lithuania is still a rare tradition, rarely found outside the National Basketball Association in Europe.

=== After the restoration of independence (from 1990) ===
==== 1990s ====
"I believe that new Sabonis and Marčiulions will grow up and will create a new superb team again."

— Konstantinas Savickas, first Lithuania national team coach, sharing his thoughts in 1991.

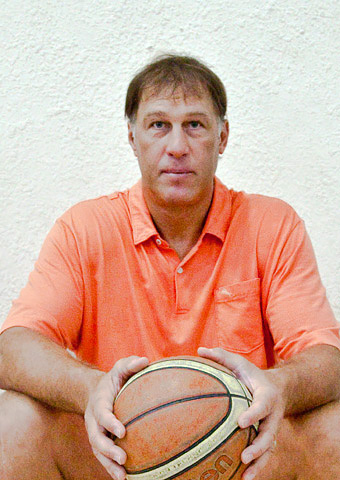
Šarūnas Marčiulionis, the first Lithuanian to play in the NBA, was instrumental in getting funds for the Lithuania national team's restoration and for its success in 1992–1996

After Lithuania's independence was restored on 11 March 1990, the country wanted to stand on its own in the basketball community again, complete with the standout players from the 1988 Soviet squad – Sabonis, Marčiulions, Chomičius and Kurtinaitis – expressing a desire to represent Lithuania. The National Olympic Committee of Lithuania (LTOK) and Lithuanian Basketball Federation (LKF) were restored, Lithuania withdrew its athletes from all Soviet national competitions, and both Sabonis and Marčiulions refused a request to play for the Soviet Union during the 1990 Goodwill Games. In 1991, the International Olympic Committee welcomed Lithuania back to its ranks in September, and in December, LKF president Stanislovas Stonkus attended the FIBA congress in Springfield, Massachusetts, and requested the right to be a full member of FIBA once again. FIBA president George E. Killian granted Stonkus' request and invited Lithuania to participate in all of the FIBA organized events. Sabonis and his agent started looking for Lithuanian-born or descended players, sending phone calls and faxes over Europe and North America.

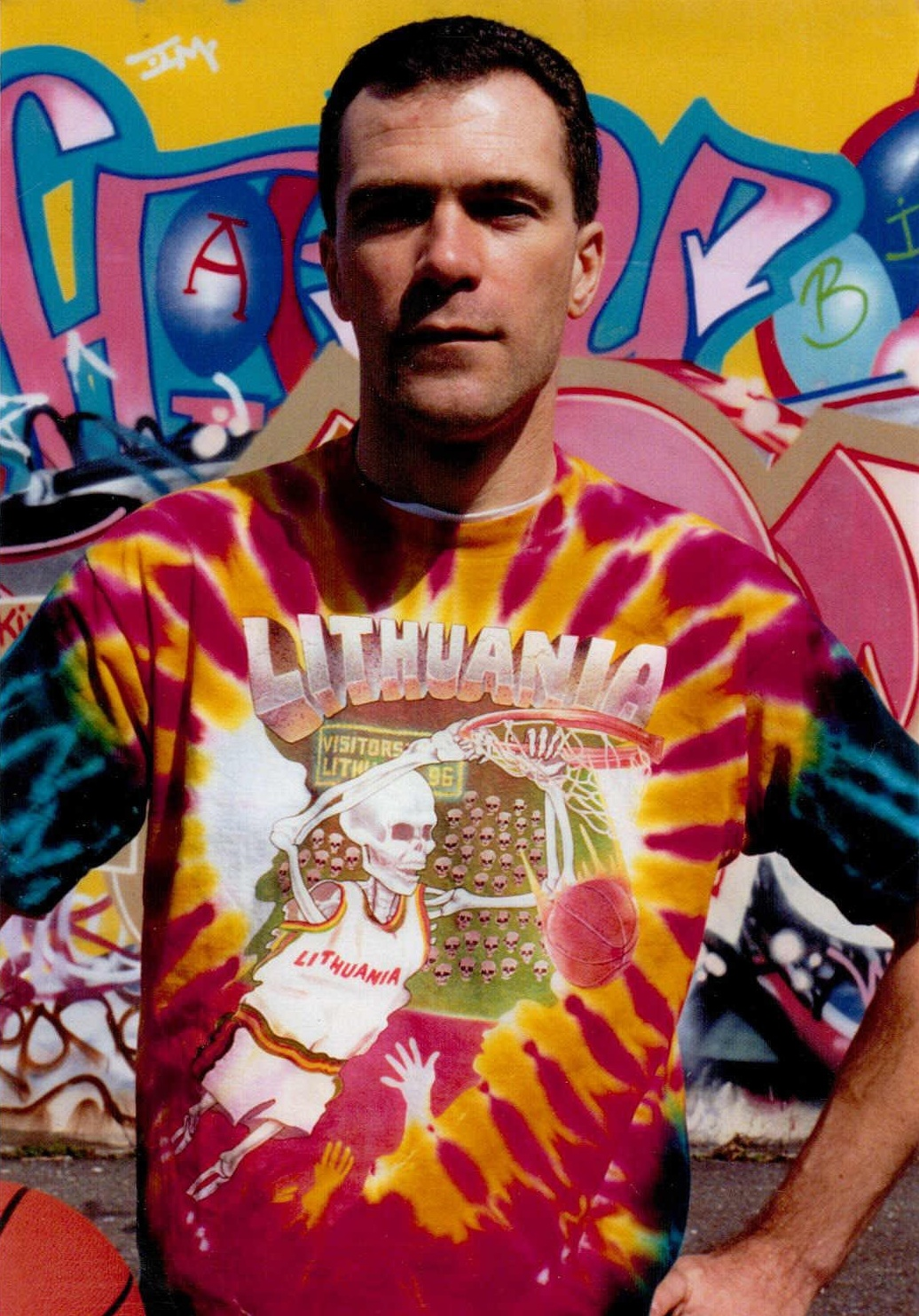
New York artist Greg Speirs wearing the "Skully" tie-dyed T-shirt which he designed and became a symbol of Lithuanian basketball

However, Lithuania's economic transition left the country in a difficult financial situation, and LKF could hardly count on state funding. As a result, the team had to search for the financial supporters by themselves in order to play internationally. Šarūnas Marčiulionis had experience and contacts in the United States from being the first USSR player in the NBA, playing for the Golden State Warriors. Consequently, he, along with Donnie Nelson (son of Marčiulionis' then-coach Don Nelson), searched for financial supporters that could finance Lithuania's participation in the international games and the 1992 Summer Olympics. George Shirk wrote a story about this on the San Francisco Chronicle, and once American rock band Grateful Dead read the newspaper, they decided to help the team. Drummer Mickey Hart added that the story resonated with the bandmembers for being "a struggle for life, liberty and freedom." The bandmembers donated $5,000 to Marčiulionis, and helped launch a tie-dyed jerseys trade that would feature Lithuania's national colors and the iconic, trademarked 'Slam-Dunking Skeleton' created by N.Y. artist Greg Speirs. The skeleton dunking a flaming basketball, nicknamed "Skully", was the artist's interpretation of how the Lithuanian team rose from the ashes to victory. The artist's profits would be passed onto the Lithuania men's national basketball team and a fund for Lithuanian children. The Lithuanians were favourable to the garish shirts because, according to Nelson, it was a great contrast to "all those years of those Soviet colors, nothing but blues and grays". Arvydas Sabonis even said that "My first impression of [the jerseys] was: Wow, this really is a free Lithuania". The initial version of the tie-dye jerseys was with a text in English 'Better dead than red'. The skeleton, nicknamed "Skully", was enshrined into the Basketball Hall of Fame, being the only cartoon character to be enshrined in any sports Hall of Fame. New versions of the Skully jerseys were featured in the following two Olympic Games.

To assume the head coach position of the restored Lithuania men's national basketball team, American Dan Peterson, then in Italy, was invited but declined. BC Žalgiris manager Raimundas Sargunas became coach, but problems with the players made him demoted to assistant, a job shared with Donnie Nelson and Spanish Javier Imbroda, who was invited following Sabonis' suggestion of a Liga ACB veteran. The eventual choice was Vladas Garastas, another Žalgiris veteran who was assistant in the 1988 Soviet squad.

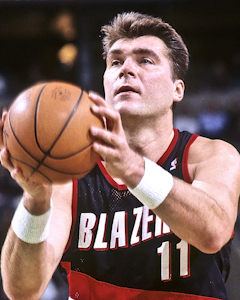
International superstar Arvydas Sabonis led Lithuania to two Olympic bronze medals and one EuroBasket silver medal in 1992–1996

Preparation for Lithuania men's national basketball team's first major international tournament since regaining independence began in May 1992, as it was the first time a squad of players mostly playing outside the country could get together and train. While missing Sabonis, Marčiulionis and Artūras Karnišovas, Lithuania competed in the eight-teams Nordic Countries Championship. They took the second place there, losing only to the well-known opponents Latvia 80–95 in the final. Standout players included Gintaras Krapikas (22.5 points per game) and Rimas Kurtinaitis (19 points).

Afterwards, the country celebrated 70 years of Lithuanian basketball, and among the events was a competition featuring two Lithuanian teams, Latvia, Belarus, Finland, and Illinois State University basketball team. The superiority of the Lithuanians, now counting with Sabonis and Marčiulionis, made them handily beat the opponents. Following it, Lithuania national team was invited to compete in the prestigious annual Acropolis Tournament hosted by Greece, along with Italy and France. Lithuanians began the competition shockingly, immediately crushing the EuroBasket 1991 silver medalists Italians 116–94 (at one point leading by 87–49). Though, then they narrowly lost to the host Greece squad 81–83 and after easily defeating the French squad 109–78, took the second place. Despite not winning the cup, this was a perfect first major international challenge for the Lithuania national team, giving the solid hopes of success for the newly reborn state. Shortly before the opening of the Olympic Games, Lithuanians also overcame the Olympics host Spain 107–97 in Ibiza.

"There is gold in Seoul, but here, as they say – the soul is put in, and there only the gold remains. And here – the soul."

— Arvydas Sabonis, comparing 1988 Olympic gold medal with the Soviet Union team and 1992 Olympic bronze medal with Lithuania team.

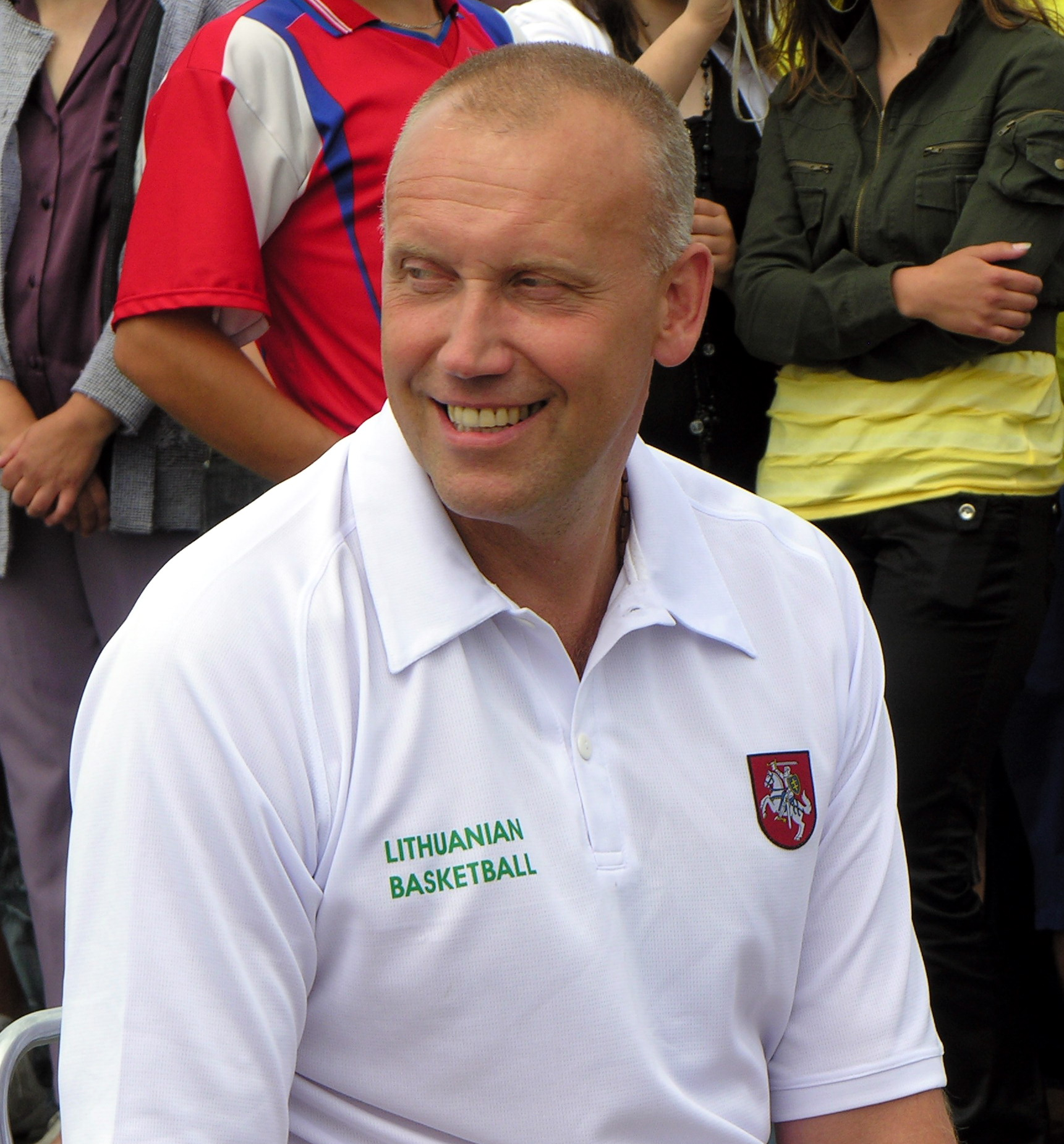
Rimas Kurtinaitis, one of the Lithuanian team leaders in 1992–1996 and later a head coach

Lithuania was among the many European independent states that due to the dissolutions of the Soviet Union and Yugoslavia, would return to the Olympic competition for the 1992 games. For the 1992 Pre-Olympic Basketball Tournament, held in Spain from 22 June to 5 July, Lithuania was joined by the debuting Croatia, Slovenia, Latvia, and Estonia, along with the non-Baltic Soviet republics in a Commonwealth of Independent States. The latter was a particularly awaited adversary for the Lithuanians, as according to LTOK president Artūras Poviliūnas, "We have dreamed all of our lives about playing versus the Soviet Union. Although it's not called the Soviet Union any more, this game will be very important and very symbolic. It will be as important as the Olympics themselves." With a trip funded by the Spanish city of Melilla, Lithuania managed to get one of the four qualifying spots disputed by 25 participants, winning all their 11 games in the tournament. The Olympic Qualifying Tournament game of 22 June 1992 versus the Netherlands men's national team was the first official international game for Lithuania men's national basketball team after more than half a century break, which the Lithuanians won 100–75. During the 1992 Summer Olympics Lithuania men's national basketball team lost the semifinal 76–127 to the United States squad nicknamed "Dream Team" but won bronze medals after defeating 82–78 the Unified Team, which was composed from players of the former Soviet Union states, except for Baltic states. Donnie Nelson described the locker room as "like winning the NBA championship times five". After the bronze medal victory, de jure Head of State Vytautas Landsbergis visited the team at the locker room, and they all sung the Lithuanian national anthem.

During the qualifiers for EuroBasket 1993, Lithuanian basketball had its biggest disappointment. Missing Sabonis but still with most of the 1992 Olympic bronze medal squad, Lithuania played in a three team group in Wrocław, and beat hosts Poland but lost to Belarus, being eliminated by the fellow former United Republic. It remains Lithuania's only absence in EuroBaskets following independence.

In 1994, the Lithuania men's national under-18 team won the first FIBA Youth Competition, the 1994 FIBA Europe Under-18 Championship.

Moreover, in the early 1990s first actions were made to restore Lithuanian clubs leagues. In 1993, the Lietuvos krepšinio lyga (the premier Lithuanian men's basketball league) was established. In 1994, the Lietuvos moterų krepšinio lyga (the premier Lithuanian women's basketball league) was established. In 1994, the second tier Lithuanian men's basketball league, Lietuvos Krepšinio A Lyga, was established. Since the late 1990s the Lietuvos krepšinio lyga is particularly known for its long-term rivalry between Lithuania capital city Vilnius team BC Lietuvos rytas / BC Rytas and the most titled Lithuanian basketball club BC Žalgiris from Lithuania's second largest city Kaunas.

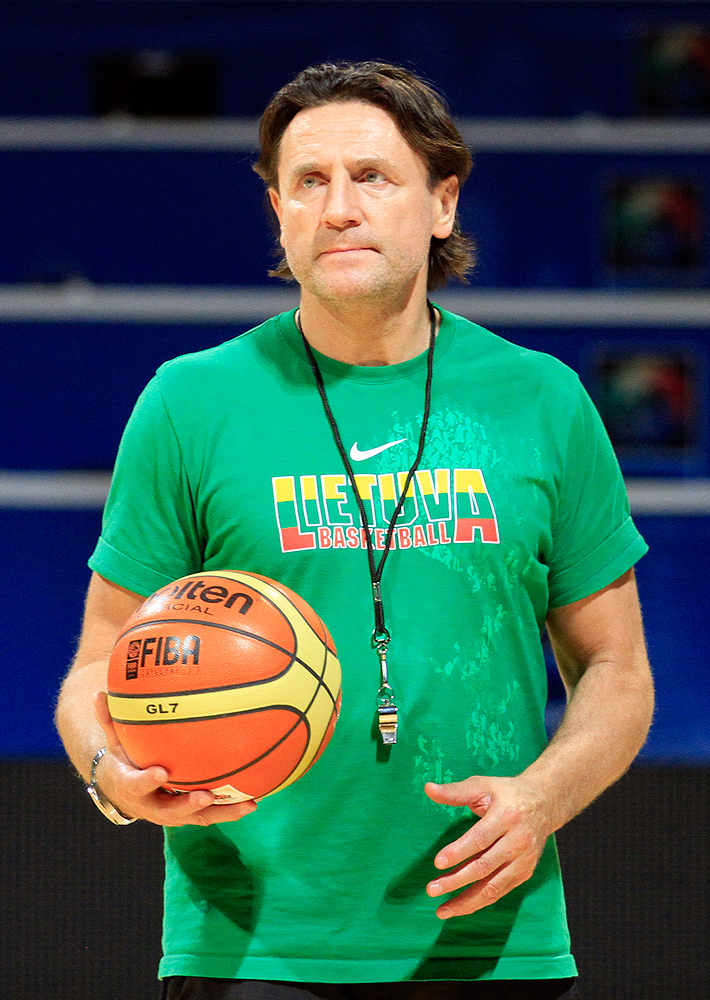
EuroBasket 1995 was the last FIBA international tournament for Olympic champion Valdemaras Chomičius as a player

Sabonis returned to the Lithuania national team for the EuroBasket 1995 and the team advanced into EuroBasket final after 56 years, demonstrating the Lithuanian basketball's vitality and strength, in spite of all the previous difficulties. The final was with the Yugoslavia men's national basketball team. The tense finale, where Lithuania had the support of the home crowd as the Serbs had eliminated Greece, had Lithuania winning the close first half, 49–48. With five minutes remaining, Sabonis fouled out, as the Lithuanians were behind 76–83, later closing to 83–84. With Yugoslavia leading 87–83, Saulius Štombergas made a shot that was ruled out as the referee George Toliver called an offensive foul. Lithuanians protested the decision and received three technical fouls (first Sabonis, then Marčiulionis and then the whole team), leading them to leave the court in protest, only returning when persuaded by the Serbs. Aleksandar Đorđević, the game's overall top scorer with 41 points, scored all three free-throws. Lithuania eventually lost the game 90–96. After the final whistle, Greek fans shouted "Lithuania is the champion" and booed Yugoslavia during the medal ceremony, which also had the third-placed Croatians leaving for the Yugoslavs – who were still waging a war against Croatia. Marčiulionis, who was named tournament MVP, later stated that "we felt robbed and we still feel that", while acknowledging that despite the questionable refereeing, the silver medal came due to a lack of depth in the Lithuanian bench along with the Yugoslavs knowing "how to provoke other players and initiate psychological battles".

On May 14, 1993, the Lithuania women's national basketball team played its first international game since the interwar period and defeated Greece, 77–74. In 1995, the Lithuanian women's national team qualified for the EuroBasket Women 1995 and returned to the EuroBasket Women for the first time since 1938 (finished fifth).

On 7 July 1996, the Lithuania men's national under-20 basketball team won the 1996 FIBA Europe Under-20 Championship.

The 1996 Summer Olympics were the last international tournament with the Lithuania men's national team for Olympic champions Marčiulionis and Kurtinaitis. The Lithuanians started their second Olympics by beating 1992 Olympic vice-champions Croatia – led by Toni Kukoč, Stojko Vranković, and Dino Rađa – 83–81 in a tough match with two overtimes, however later lost to Argentine and the host United States, but defeated Angola and China. In the quarterfinal game the Lithuanians crushed Greeks 99–66. The Olympic semifinal match awaited with powerhouse Yugoslavia, undefeated that far and inspiring the Lithuanians to avenge the 1995 EuroBasket final, however the Lithuanians lost the game 58–66. Sabonis was the driving force of the bronze medal game, neutralizing defender Mark Bradtke on the way to 30 points, 13 rebounds, 3 assists and 5 blocks, and by defeating Australia (80–74) the Lithuanians again won bronze medal.

While selecting its squad for the EuroBasket 1997, Lithuania retained only two primary players from the 1995 silver medalists: Artūras Karnišovas and Gintaras Einikis. The so-called "golden generation" was replaced by up-and-coming youngsters such as Šarūnas Jasikevičius, Dainius Adomaitis, Virginijus Praškevičius, and Eurelijus Žukauskas. Furthermore, Jonas Kazlauskas took over as head coach. Lithuania managed to win all games in the group stage. The second round lead to tougher times to the Lithuanians, winning only against Turkey while losing to Greece and Russia. The poor performance lead them to face defending champions Yugoslavia, who beat Lithuania 75–60 on the way to another title. Lithuania finished the tournament sixth and qualified to their first-ever FIBA World Championship.

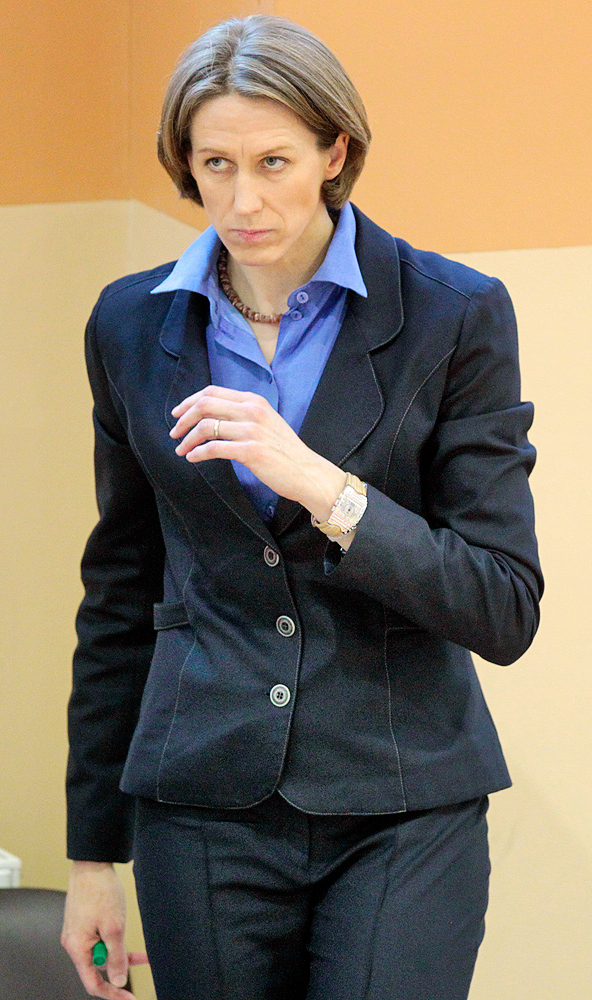
Jurgita Štreimikytė in 1997 led Lithuania women's national team to its first EuroBasket Women champions title

The Lithuania women's national basketball team by losing some key players from the previous years travelled to the EuroBasket 1997 Women with reserved expectations. However, the Lithuanians, coached by Vydas Gedvilas, won four of five games in the group phase, in the quarterfinal defeated Moldova (68–53), in the semi-final defeated Germany after OT (78–77), confidently defeated Slovenia in the final (72–62) and won the first EuroBasket Women title for Lithuania. Jurgita Štreimikytė was included into the All-Tournament Team.

The Lithuania women's national team competed in the 1998 FIBA World Championship for Women, which was their debut in this tournament, where in the first and second rounds they won two games out of five, while in the quarter-final they lost to Brazil (70–72) and eventually finished sixth.

Debuting in its first FIBA World Championship in the 1998 FIBA World Championship with a young roster, the Lithuania men's national team went undefeated in the group stage, crushing South Korea before beating a United States team lacking the NBA elite due to a lockout, and a close defeat of Brazil. The second round was tougher for Lithuania, who lost to Australia, and despite beating Argentina, wound up losing in overtime to Spain. A quarterfinal against Russia ensued, and while the Lithuanians had beaten them two weeks before and had a 38–35 advantage at halftime, the Russians beat the inexperienced team by 82–67. Following the consolation tournament with a loss to Italy and a win over Argentina, Lithuania finished in seventh place. However, the equal games and especially the victory over the United States were promising for the young Lithuanian squad.

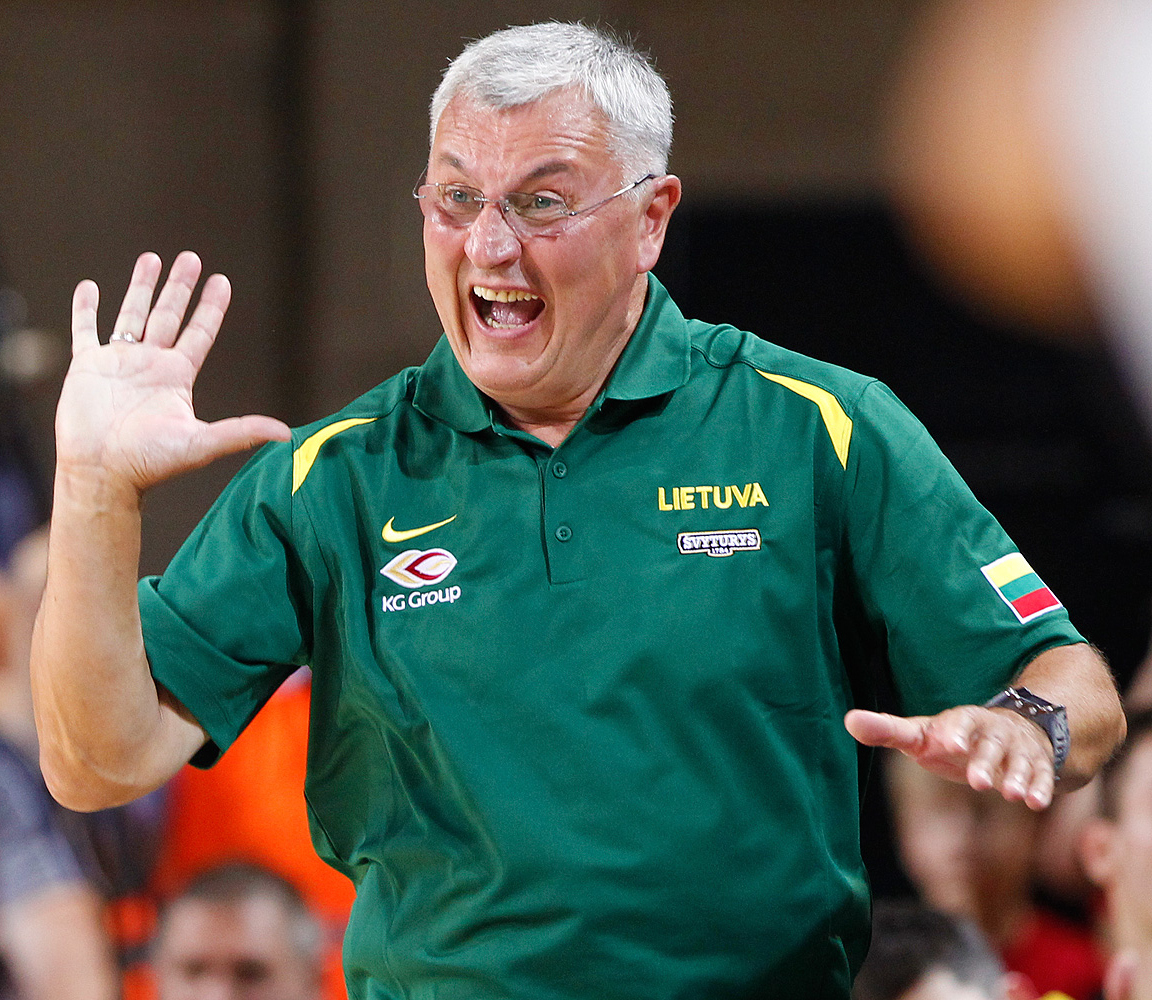
Jonas Kazlauskas, who won the EuroLeague in 1999 coaching the Žalgiris Kaunas and won three medals coaching the senior Lithuania men's national basketball team

In 1999, BC Žalgiris won the EuroLeague tournament.

The Lithuania women's national team competed in the EuroBasket Women 1999 as reigning champions, however in the quarterfinal they lost (69–63) to Slovakia and eventually finished sixth.

Lithuanian superstar Sabonis (then 34 years old) and Karnišovas returned to the Lithuania men's national team for their last FIBA international tournament at EuroBasket 1999. The tournament started with a surprise, as an underdog Czech Republic beat Lithuania. Afterwards, the Lithuanian team found its stride and won the five following games in the first and second rounds. Reaching the knockout rounds, Lithuanians were favorites against Spain, but lost by a close 74–72 score. Two wins in the consolation tournament gave Lithuania the fifth place and a qualifying spot for the 2000 Summer Olympics, while the solid performances by the young Štombergas and Jasikevičius gave a bright outset for their future.

==== 2000s ====
'Trys Milijonai' (2000)
The song by Marijonas Mikutavičius was introduced for the 2000 Summer Olympics, but since then is popularly regarded as Lithuanian sport and basketball anthem

During the 1999–2000 season BC Lietuvos rytas defeated BC Žalgiris during the LKL Finals, becoming the first Lithuanian champions other than BC Žalgiris, and further fueled their rivalry.

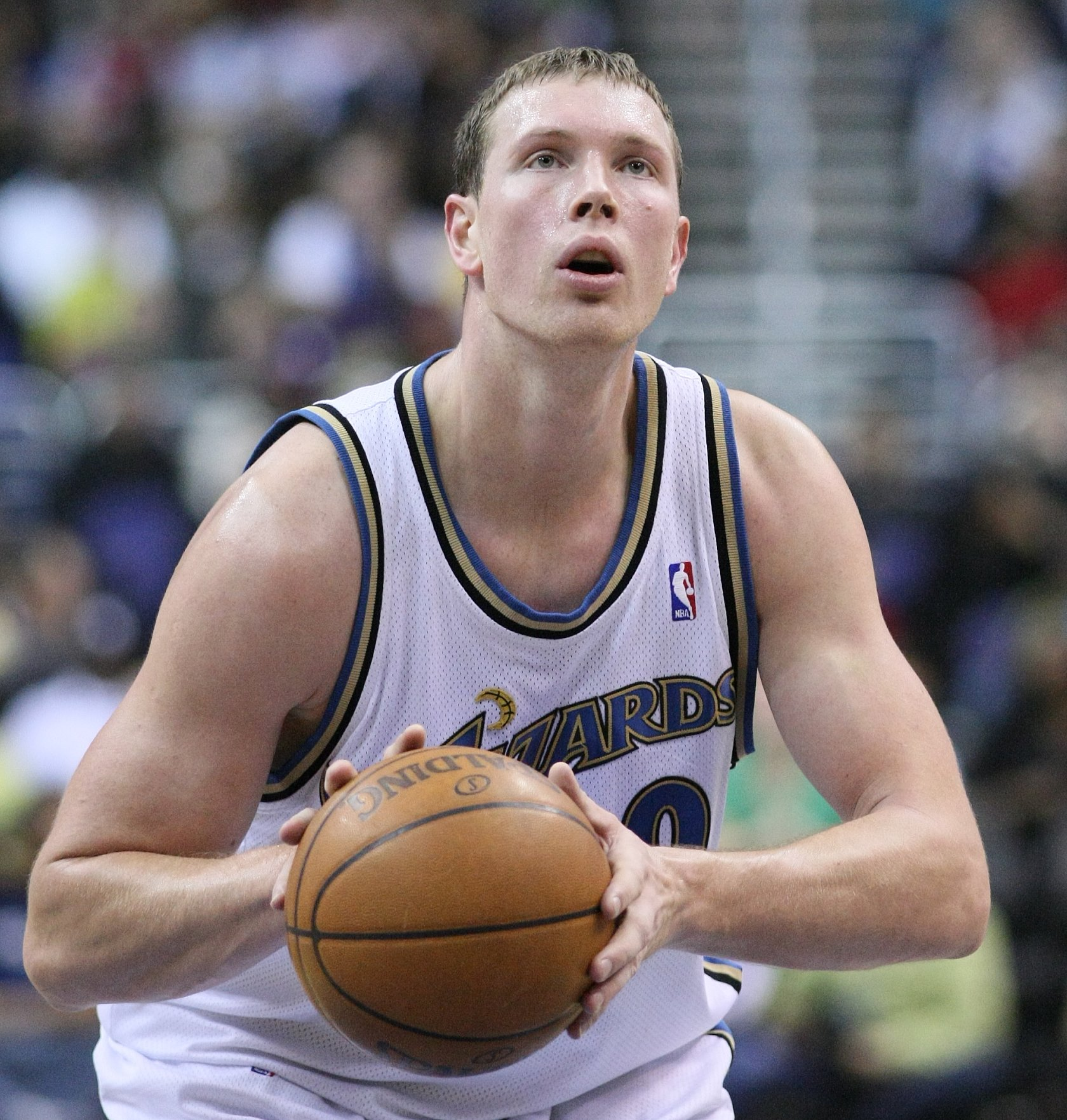
Darius Songaila, one of the Lithuanian national team leaders, during his debut years in 2000

The 2000 Olympic tournament marked another time of renovation for Lithuania. The only veterans, Saulius Štombergas and Eurelijus Žukauskas, were reserves at the 1996 Olympics, while eight players were Olympic debutants: Ramūnas Šiškauskas, Darius Songaila, Šarūnas Jasikevičius, Mindaugas Timinskas, Andrius Giedraitis, Kęstutis Marčiulionis, Darius Maskoliūnas and Tomas Masiulis. In the group phase the Lithuanians lost to Italy, then crushed the upcoming Olympic vice-champions France, gave the third incarnation of the United States "Dream Team" the toughest matchup since the NBA players joined United States team and lost just 85–76, defeated China, Australia. In the quarterfinal the Lithuanians for the first time defeated Yugoslavia (76–63), while in the semifinal the Lithuanians nearly beat the United States, but a last second long shot by Jasikevičius was an air ball, and the United States with NBA players managed its smallest victory ever (85–83). The United States widely covered how the small nation nearly upset a team that seemed previously unbeatable in previous tournaments. Eventually, the Lithuanians won their third consecutive Olympic bronze medal by defeating hosts Australia (89–71).

The Lithuania women's national team during the EuroBasket Women 2001 in the quarter-final defeated (83–81) the reigning champions Poles, but in the semi-final lost (44–75) to France and in the bronze medal game lost (89–74) to Spain, thus finished fourth.

The EuroBasket 2001 ended as an unexpected failure to Lithuania. The group stage started with two victories: over Ukraine and Israel, before losing to France and a match versus Latvia could have gave a spot in the knockout stages, but the Lithuanians lost the game 64–94, lost all the chances of participating in the 2002 FIBA World Championship and could have even missed the next EuroBasket, thus Kazlauskas resigned as head coach. The same year the Lietuvos moksleivių krepšinio lyga (the Lithuanian pupils basketball league) was established in Lithuania.

In the 2002 FIBA World Championship for Women the Lithuania women's national team won just once versus the Chinese Taipei (92–80) and lost to Russia (97–61), United States (105–48), while in the second round they lost to France (71–63) and won versus Cuba (63–60), however with a 2–4 record they failed to advance to the knockout stage and finished 11th.

The Lithuania women's national team failed to qualify for the EuroBasket Women 2003 and coach Gedvilas resigned.

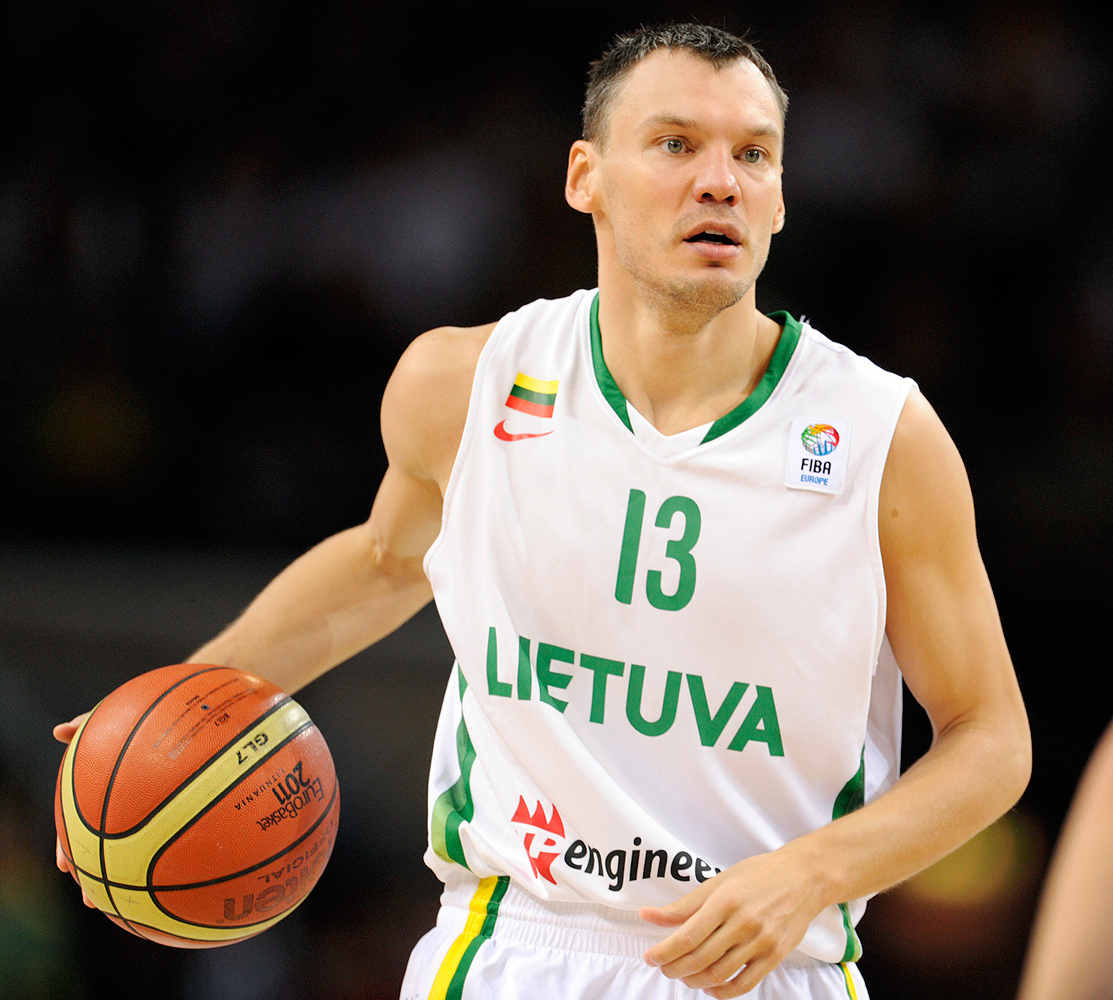
Šarūnas Jasikevičius led the Lithuania men's national basketball team to the third EuroBasket men's title in 2003 and to the first victory versus the United States men's Olympic basketball team in 2004

On the contrary, the Lithuania men's national team managed to qualify for the EuroBasket 2003 by winning all ten qualification games. The renewed Lithuania men's national team, coached by head coach Antanas Sireika, was led by Jasikevičius, Arvydas Macijauskas, Šiškauskas and Štombergas. The Lithuanians finished the group phase with a 3–0 record (defeated Latvia, Israel, Germany), then defeated Serbia and Montenegro in the quarterfinal (98–82), France in the semifinal (70–74) and after defeating Spain in the final (93–84) won Lithuania's third EuroBasket men's title after a 64-year hiatus, while Jasikevičius was named the FIBA EuroBasket MVP.

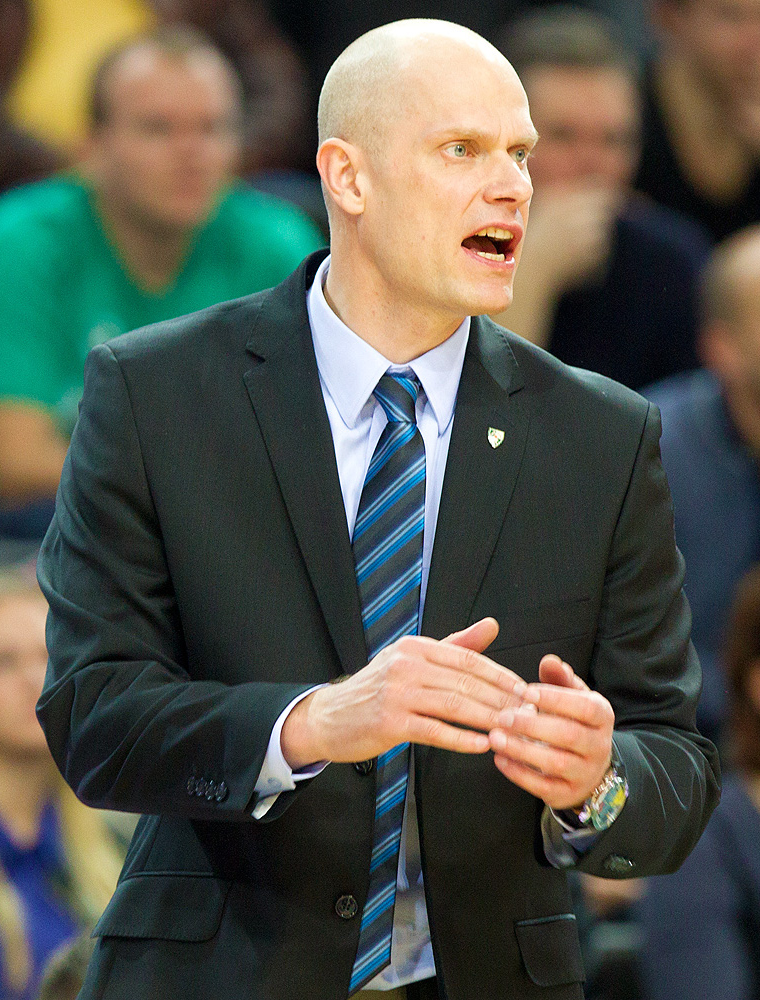
Saulius Štombergas, a long-term captain of the Lithuania men's national team and the flag bearer of Lithuania at the 2004 Summer Olympics

For the 2004 Olympics, basketball team captain Štombergas was given the honor to bear the Lithuanian flag during the opening ceremony. The Lithuanians won all five games in the group phase, including their first 94–90 Olympic victory versus the United States team composed from NBA players like Allen Iverson, Tim Duncan, Dwyane Wade, LeBron James, Carmelo Anthony, etc. In the quarterfinals Lithuanians easily swept China 95–75, however in the semifinal Lithuanians were defeated 91–100 by Italians, who shattered the Lithuanian dream of Olympic gold. Playing for the bronze medal the Lithuanians again faced the United States who revanche 104–96 and left the Lithuanians without Olympic medals for the first time.

In 2005, BC Lietuvos rytas won the second-tier European league, EuroCup, thus in the 2005–2006 season BC Lietuvos rytas debuted in the top-tier European league, EuroLeague, and it was the first time when two Lithuanian clubs (together with BC Žalgiris) competed in the top-tier European basketball league.

During the EuroBasket Women 2005 the Lithuanians had an initially successful run by finishing first in the preliminary round with a 4–1 record, in the quarter-final they defeated Poland (67–58), but in the semi-final they lost to Russia (50–65) and in the bronze medal game lost (83–65) to Spain, thus finished fourth.

Starting the EuroBasket 2005 as defending champions, Lithuania men's national team initially proved their favoritism by beating Turkey, Croatia and Bulgaria with solid differences, however in the quarterfinal Lithuanians poorly attacked the basket and suffered a defeat to France (47–63), while after defeating Russia and Slovenia finished fifth.

In the preliminary round of the 2006 FIBA World Championship for Women the Lithuania women's national team failed to reach the Ibirapuera Arena in time for a tip-off and suffered a technical defeat 0–2, but later rehabilitated by defeating Canada and Senegal, later in the Eighth-final round they won just once versus Argentina and lost to Brazil, Spain, while in the quarter-final they faced the United States to who they lost (90–56) and eventually finished sixth.

During the 2006 FIBA World Championship the Lithuania men's national team finished the group phase with a 3–2 record by losing to Turkey and Greeks, but defeated Qatar, Australia, and Brazil. In the knockout round Lithuanians firstly defeated Italy (71–68), but in the quarterfinal were crushed with a 22 points margin by eventual champions Spain, then also lost to Turkey and after defeating Germany they finished seventh. Following it, coach Sireika resigned and was replaced by Ramūnas Butautas.

In the EuroBasket Women 2007 the Lithuanians finished the preliminary round in a fourth place of six teams and in the quarter-final they faced the upcoming champions Russia to who they lost (58–75) and eventually finished sixth.

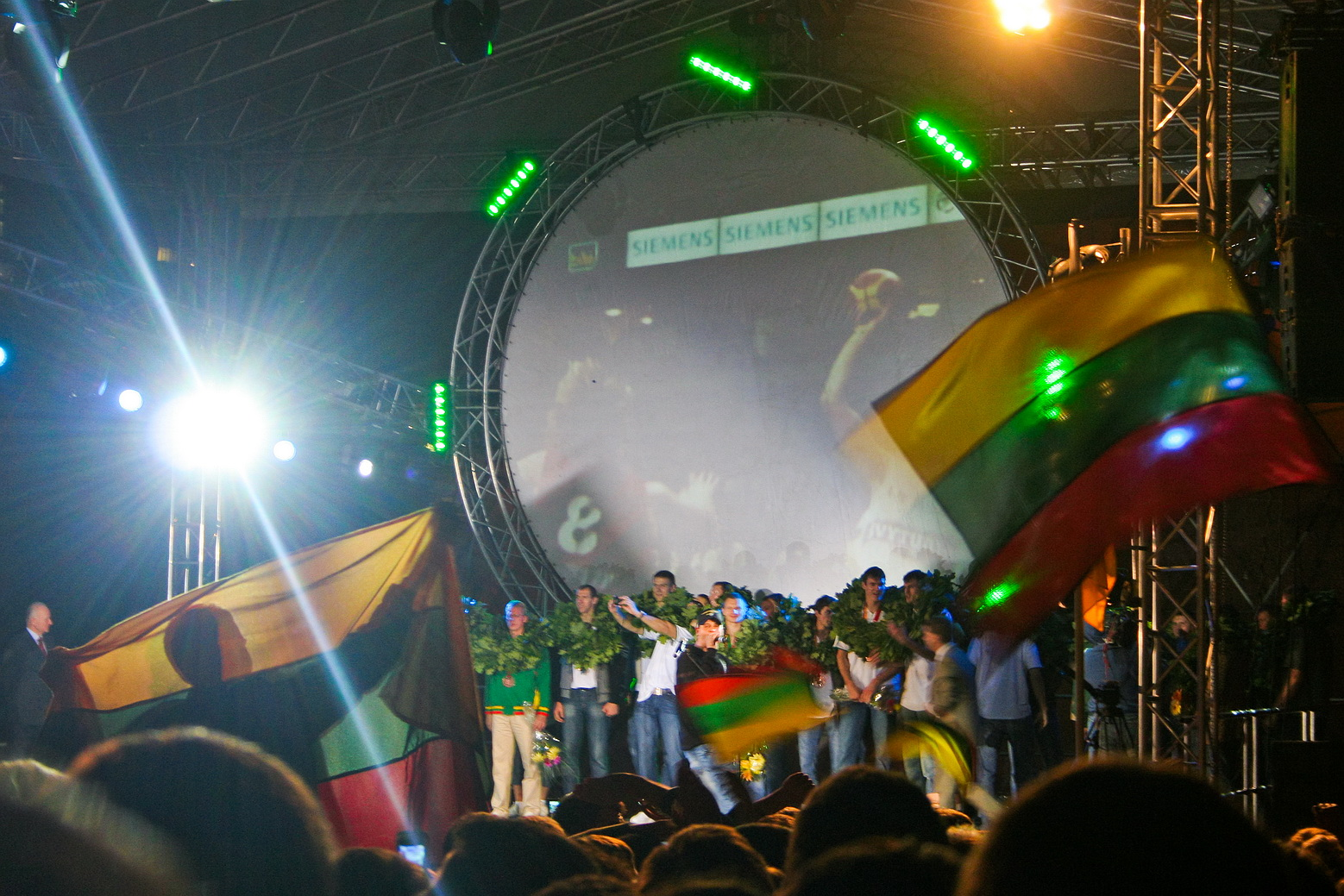
Welcoming ceremony of the EuroBasket 2007 bronze medalists in Vilnius

The Lithuanians started the preliminary round of the EuroBasket 2007 with a 3–0 record (defeated Turkey, Czech Republic, Germany), then won all three games in the second round (versus Italy, France, Slovenia), in the quarter-final defeated Croatia (74–72), but in the semifinal they met with Russia, led by a Russian star Andrei Kirilenko and a naturalized American Jon Robert Holden, and lost the game (86–74), but won a bronze medal after defeating Greece, 69–78.

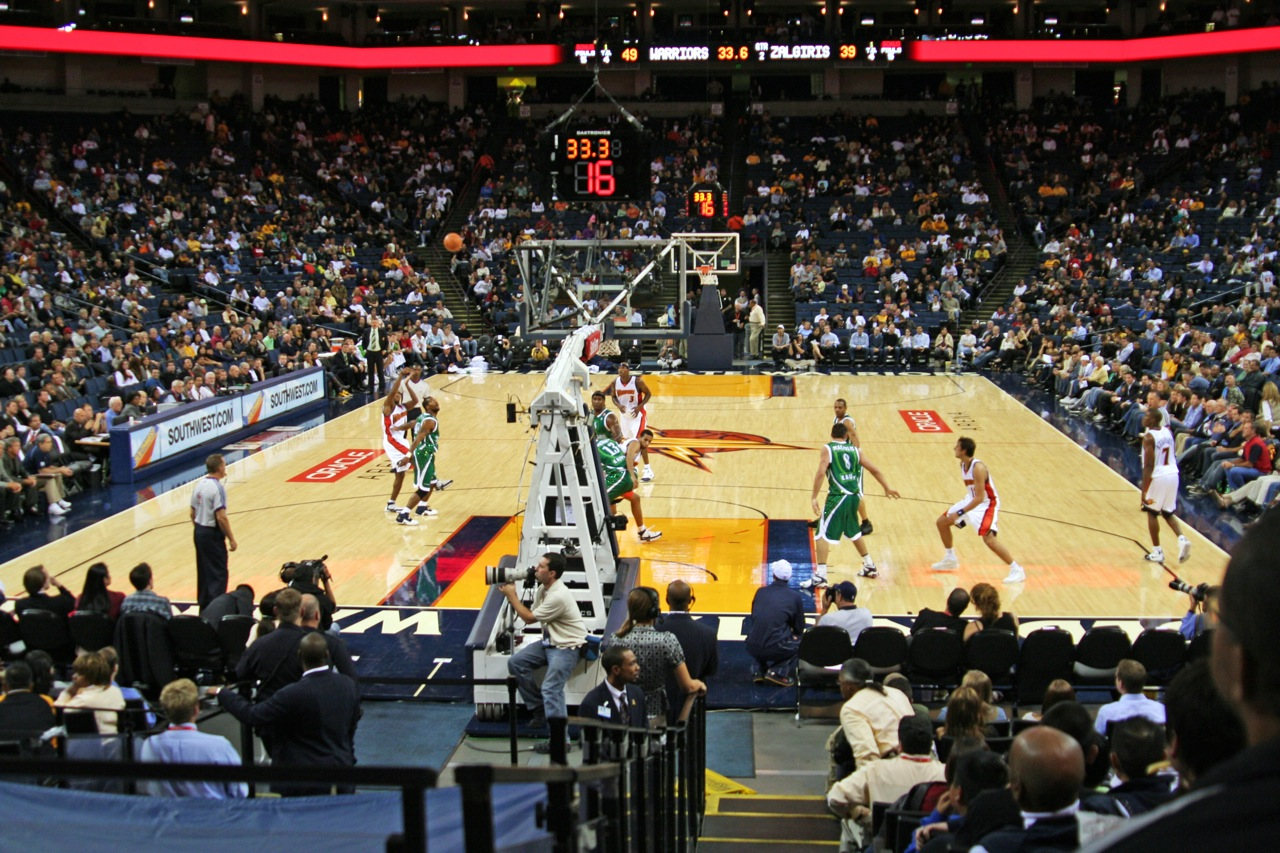
Žalgiris Kaunas playing an exhibition game versus the Golden State Warriors at the Oakland Arena in 2007

In 2007–2008, Lithuanian basketball clubs BC Žalgiris and BC Lietuvos rytas played their first friendly games versus the NBA teams.

In August 2008, the Lithuania men's national under-16 team won the 2008 FIBA Europe Under-16 Championship. The same summer the Lithuania women's national under-18 team won the 2008 FIBA Europe Under-18 Championship for Women.

Preparing for the 2008 Olympics the Lithuanians sought to include to their roster for the first time in a major tournament a two-time NBA All-Star Žydrūnas Ilgauskas, however the Cleveland Cavaliers prohibited him from playing in the Olympics due to previous injuries. Jasikevičius was given the honor to bear the flag of Lithuania at the opening ceremony. In the group stage Lithuanians finished with a 4–1 record (defeated Argentina, Iran, Russia, Croatia, but lost to Australia), in the quarterfinal defeated China (94–68), but in the semifinal after an intensive matchup lost to Spain (86–91), and then failed to defeat Argentina for the second time while playing for the bronze medal (75–87).

In 2009, BC Lietuvos rytas won the second-tier European league, EuroCup, for a second time.

In the EuroBasket Women 2009 the Lithuania women's national team suffered a fiasco as in the preliminary round they won just one of three games (defeated Serbia, lost to Turkey, Russia) and in the second round lost all three games to France, Belarus, Italy, thus they failed to qualify for the knockout stage and finished 11th.

Before the EuroBasket 2009, Lithuanian stars like Jasikevičius, Šiškauskas, Songaila, Macijauskas, Kaukėnas and Ilgauskas decided not to join the national team and the tournament turned out to be a disastrous performance for Lithuania. In the preliminary round the Lithuanians lost to Turkey, Poland and only defeated Bulgaria to qualify to the second round where they lost all three games to: Slovenia, Spain, Serbia and after failing to advance to the knockout stage finished only in 11–12th place. Following it, coach Butautas resigned and was replaced by Kęstutis Kemzūra.

On 12 December 2009, Lithuania was granted a wild card to participate in the 2010 FIBA World Championship the following year.

==== 2010s ====
On 1 August 2010, the Lithuania men's national under-18 team won the 2010 FIBA Europe Under-18 Championship, which was held in Lithuania's capital city Vilnius, by consecutively winning all 11 games in the competition.

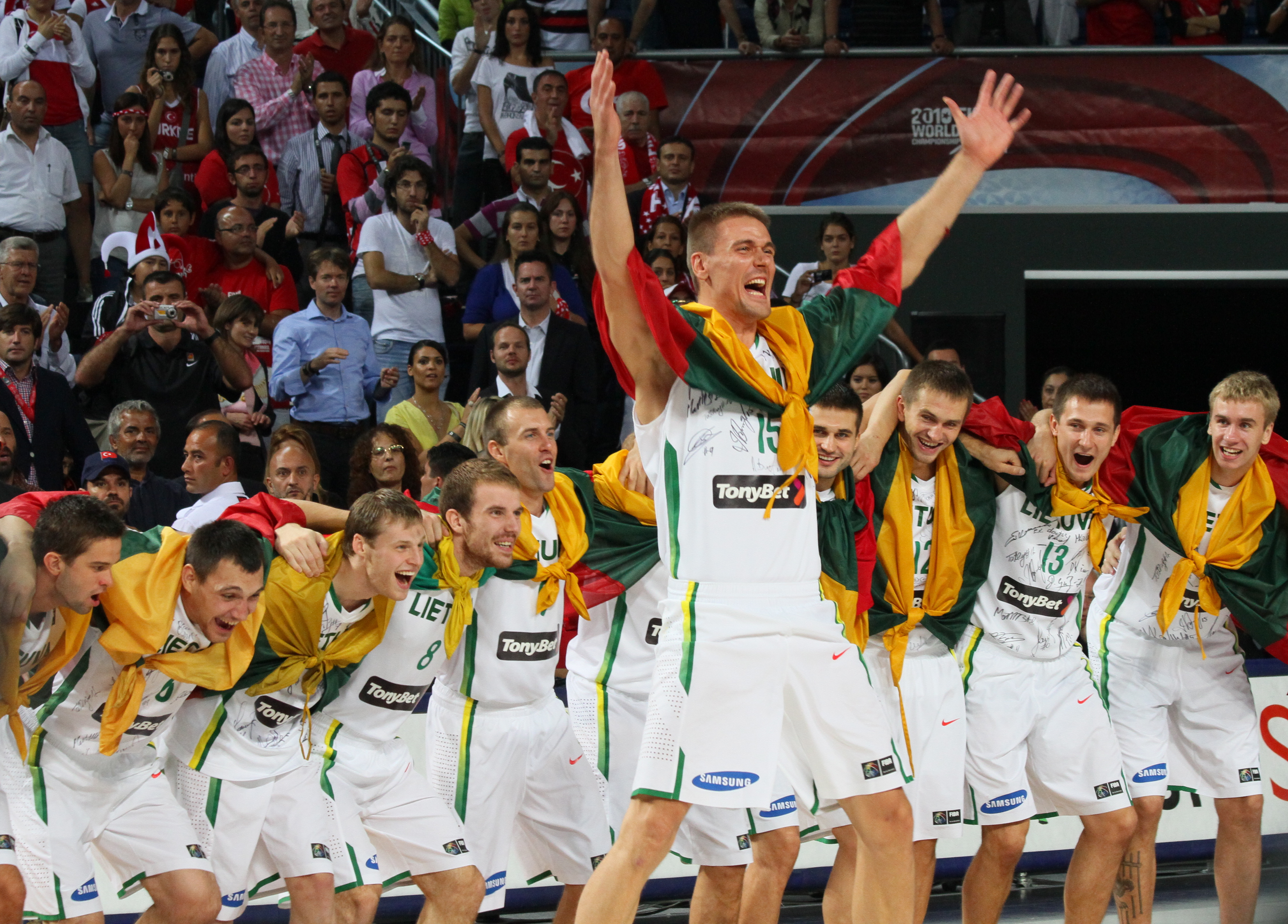
Lithuanians after winning a bronze medal in the 2010 FIBA World Championship

Lithuanian stars Jasikevičius, Šiškauskas, Songaila, Macijauskas, Kaukėnas and Ilgauskas again were not in the Lithuania men's national team roster during the 2010 FIBA World Championship, however the Lithuanians, led by Linas Kleiza, started the preliminary round by defeating all five opponents (New Zealand, Canada, last year's EuroBasket champions Spain, France, Lebanon), in the Round of 16 defeated China (78–67), in the Quarterfinals defeated Argentina (104–85), in the semi-final faced the United States (led by Kevin Durant, Chauncey Billups, Lamar Odom, Russell Westbrook, Andre Iguodala, Derrick Rose) and suffered a defeat (89–74), however they won a bronze medal by defeating Serbia (88–99) in the third–place game, while Kleiza was included into the All-Tournament team.

The Lithuania women's national team in the preliminary round of the EuroBasket Women 2011 finished first with a 2–1 record (defeated Turkey, Russia, lost to Slovakia) and in the second round quite successful run continued as they defeated Great Britain, Belarus, lost to Czech Republic, but in the quarter-final they faced off France to who they lost (58–66) and eventually finished 7th.

On 10 July 2010, the Lithuania men's national under-19 team won the 2011 FIBA Under-19 World Championship.

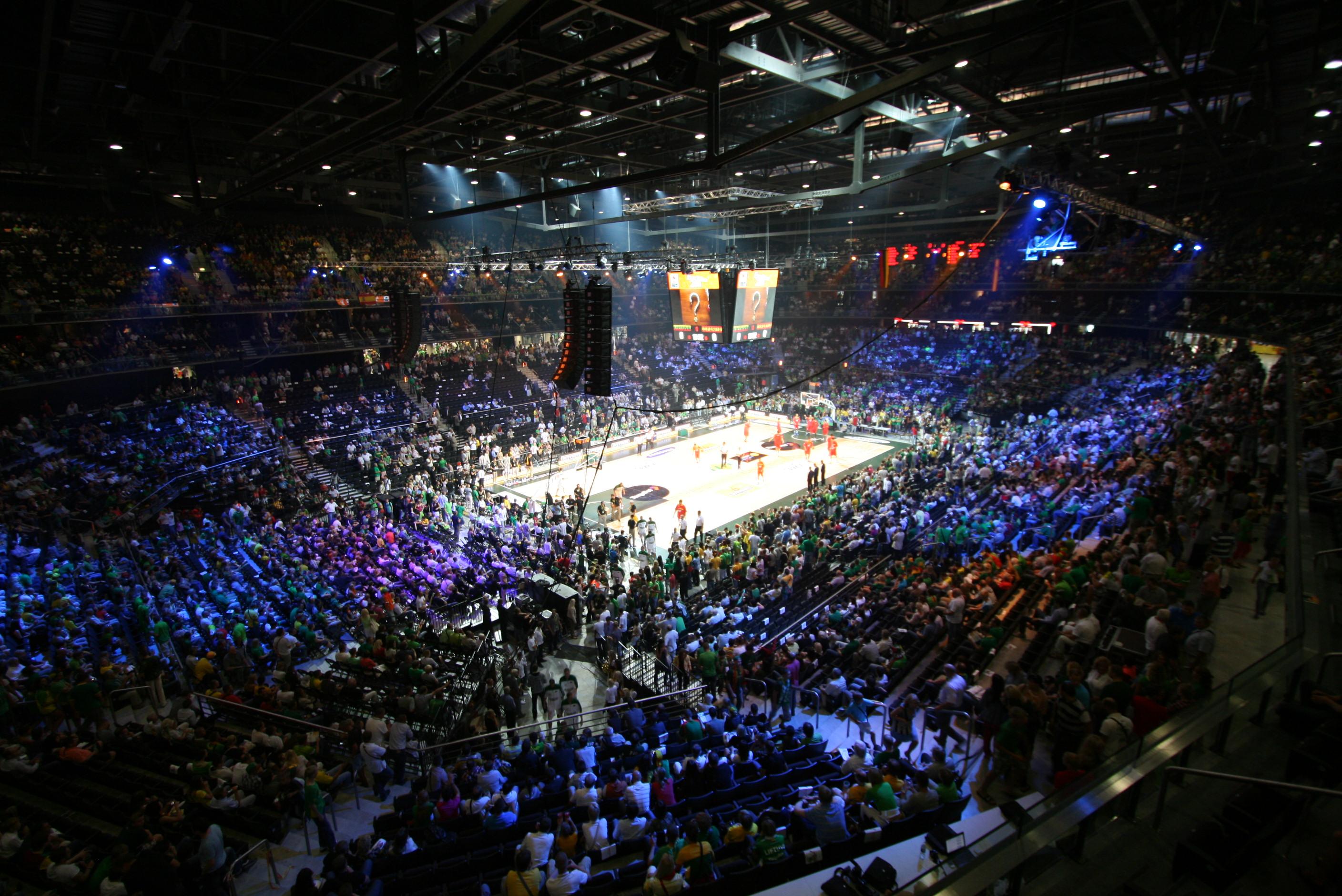
Interior of Žalgiris Arena, the largest indoor arena in Baltic states, constructed for the EuroBasket 2011 and since 2011 became a new home arena of BC Žalgiris

In 2011, Lithuania was again hosting the EuroBasket after 72 years – EuroBasket 2011. For this championship the 2010 Lithuania men's national team roster was strengthened by returning Lithuanian legends Jasikevičius, Songaila and FIBA youth competitions star Jonas Valančiūnas, however two last year's highly important players Kleiza and Jonas Mačiulis suffered injuries and were unable to join, while Marijonas Petravičius was diagnosed with pulmonary embolism after three games played. The Lithuanians finished the preliminary round with a 4–1 record (lost only to Spain), in the second round defeated Serbia and Germany, but lost to France, and in the quarterfinal faced the North Macedonia team (led by a naturalized American Bo McCalebb) to who Lithuanians lost by two points (67–65) in front of 15,000 spectators at the recently opened Žalgiris Arena. Consequently, the Lithuanians had to play only in classification games and after defeating Slovenia (77–80), Greece (73–69) finished fifth. Nevertheless, the EuroBasket 2011 was praised internationally, particularly due to the Lithuanian enthusiasm for basketball.

On 22 July 2012, the Lithuania men's national under-20 basketball team won the 2012 FIBA Europe Under-20 Championship.

The Lithuania men's national team qualified to the 2012 Olympics through the Olympic Qualifying Tournament. In the preliminary round Lithuania won just two of five games (won versus Nigeria, Tunisia, lost to Argentina, France, and the United States) and in the quarterfinal faced Russia to who they lost (83–74) and finished the Olympics in an eight place. Following it, coach Kemzūra resigned and was replaced by returning Jonas Kazlauskas.

The EuroBasket Women 2013 was disastrous for the Lithuania women's national team as in the preliminary round they won just once (versus Belarus), but lost two other games to Croatia and Czech Republic, thus finished last in the group and did not advance to the second round, finishing 14th.

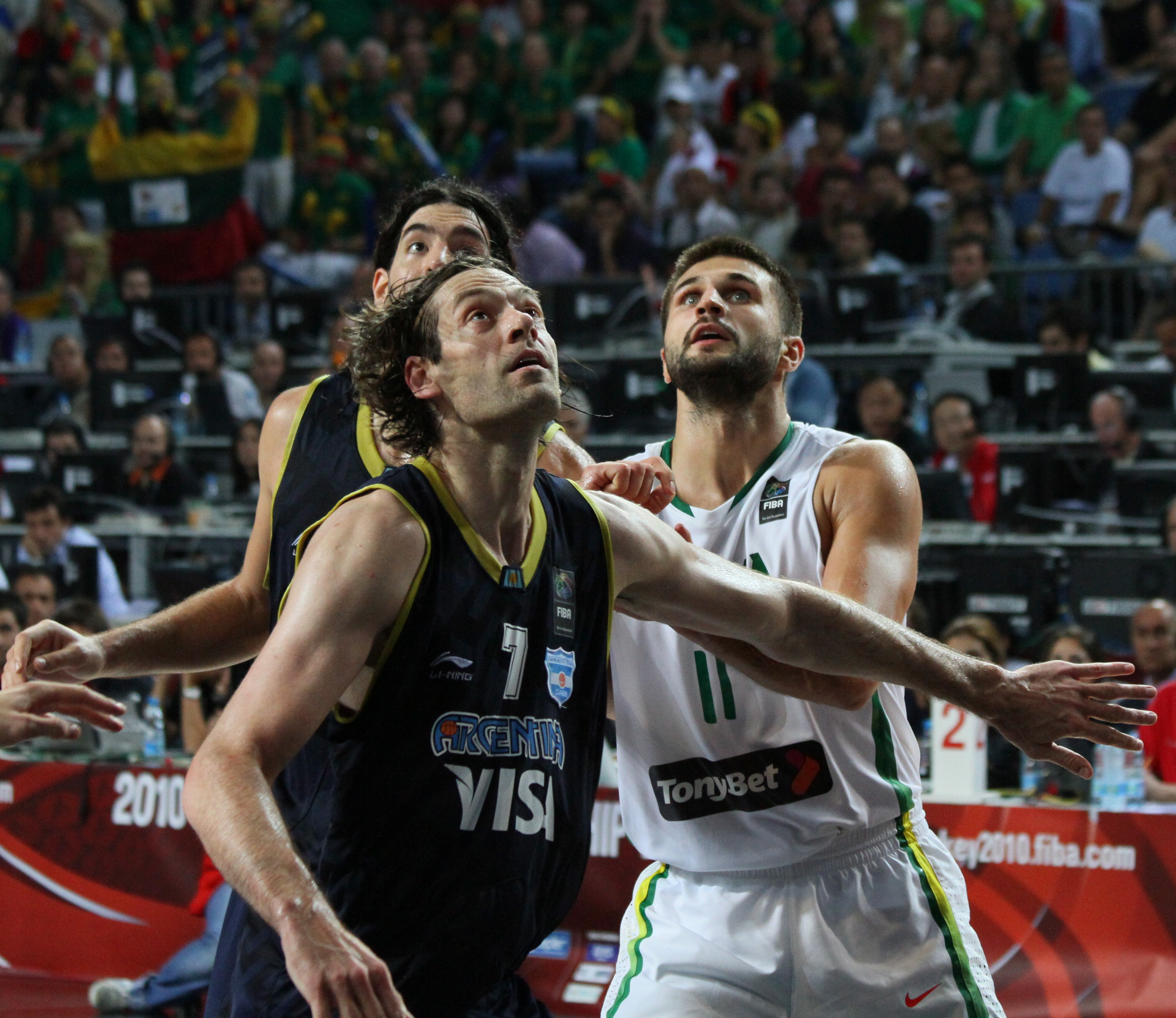
Linas Kleiza (first from the right) led Lithuania to a FIBA World Championship bronze medal in 2010 and a EuroBasket silver medal in 2013. Both times he was selected for the All-Tournament Teams.

On the contrary, the Lithuania men's national team started EuroBasket 2013 with a mixed performance in the preliminary round (won versus North Macedonia, Latvia, Montenegro, but lost to Serbia, Bosnia and Herzegovina), however in the second round Lithuanians improved their performance by defeating all three opponents (France, Belgium, Ukraine), and in the quarterfinal faced Italy who they narrowly defeated (81–77), then in the semifinal confidently defeated Croatia (77–62) and returned to the EuroBasket final after 10 years, however the final was won by France (80–66) and the Lithuanians were decorated with silver medals. Kleiza was yet again included into the All-Tournament Team.

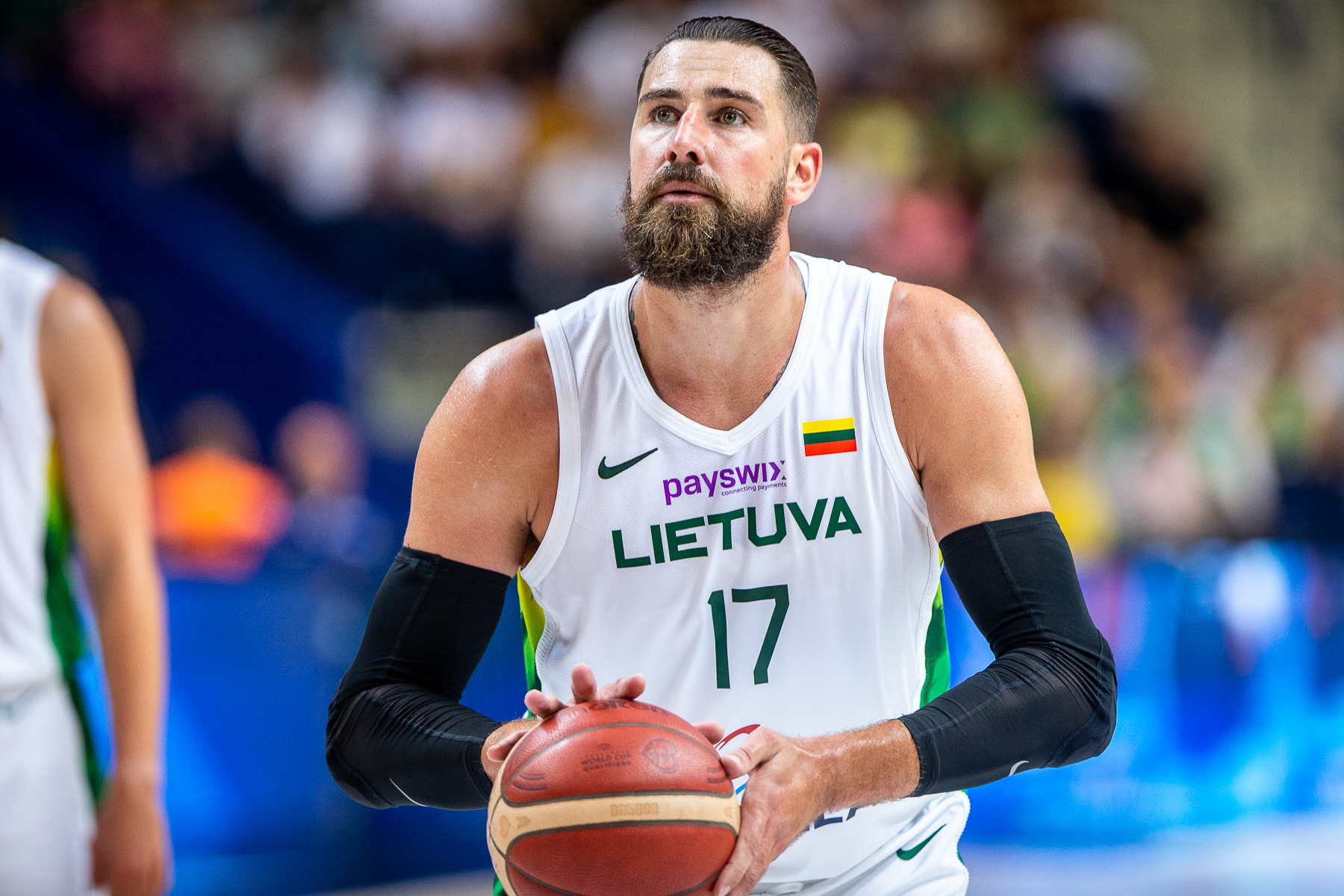
Jonas Valančiūnas, the highest male Lithuanian NBA draft pick (#5 in 2011), since 2014 became one of the key players of the Lithuania men's national team and later was also selected a team captain

As European vice-champions of 2013, Lithuania men's national team automatically qualified to the 2014 FIBA World Cup. Kleiza and captain Robertas Javtokas were unable to participate due to injuries, also one of the last year's team leaders Mantas Kalnietis dislocated his clavicle in the last preparation game. The Lithuanians began the tournament in the preliminary round with a 4–1 record (defeated Mexico, Angola, South Korea, Slovenia and only lost to Australia), in the Round of 16 they defeated New Zealand (71–76) and in the quarterfinal defeated Turkey (73–61), however in the semifinals awaited the United States (led by James Harden, Klay Thompson, Anthony Davis, Kenneth Faried, Kyrie Irving, Stephen Curry) and Lithuanians lost the game (96–68), while playing for a bronze medal Lithuanians lost to France by just two points (93–95) and finished fourth.

In the EuroBasket Women 2015 the Lithuania women's national team in the first round won two games out of four (lost to Spain, Slovakia, won versus hosts Hungary, Sweden) and in the second round defeated all three opponents (Russia, Croatia, Serbia), however in the quarterfinal they lost to Belarus (66–68) and eventually finished 8th.

During the preparation for the EuroBasket 2015 Lithuanian superstar Arvydas Sabonis son Domantas Sabonis debuted in the primary Lithuania men's national team as the youngest player ever and as the first second generation member. The start of championship was promising for the Lithuania men's national team as in the preliminary round they defeated four of five opponents (Ukraine, Latvia, Estonia, Czech Republic, lost to Belgium), then in the Round of 16 defeated Georgia, in the quarterfinal defeated Italy only after an overtime, in the semifinal defeated Serbia in the last seconds (64–67) and returned to a second consecutive EuroBasket final where they faced Spain (led by a Spanish superstar Pau Gasol) to who they lost and finished second again. Nevertheless, two Lithuanians: Valančiūnas and Mačiulis were selected to the All-Tournament Team and the team directly qualified to the 2016 Olympics. Moreover, following the championship the Lithuania men's national team was ranked third in the FIBA Men's World Ranking (at the time surpassed only by the Olympic champions United States and Spain).

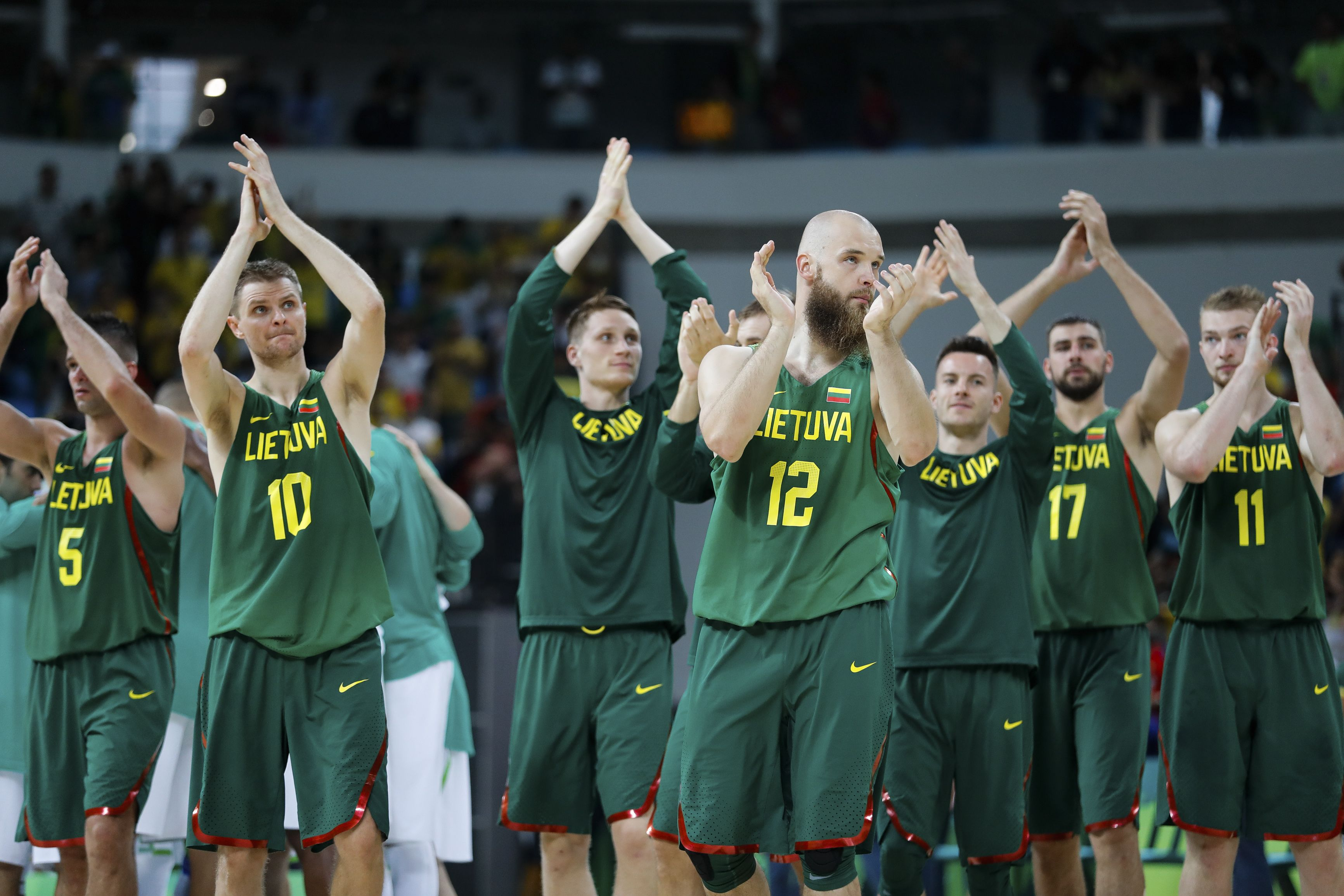
Lithuania men's national team thanking fans for their support at the 2016 Olympics

In 1992–2016 Lithuania, China, Australia and the United States were the only countries who men's national basketball teams participated in all consecutive Olympics. The beginning of the 2016 Olympics was positive for the Lithuania men's national team as they defeated first three opponents (hosts Brazil, Nigeria, Argentina), however later the Lithuanians were crushed by Spain with a 50 points margin (109–59), then they also lost to Croatia and after being eliminated in the quarterfinal by Australia (90–64) finished seventh. Following it, despite a successful 4-year lap, coach Kazlauskas refused to continue coaching the Lithuania men's national team and was replaced by a former player Dainius Adomaitis.

The EuroBasket Women 2017 qualification was a beginning of a historic downfall for the Lithuania women's national team as they failed to qualify for the EuroBasket Women 2017.

The first game of the EuroBasket 2017 for Lithuanians was shocking as they lost it to Georgia, however then they rehabilitated and won all the remaining games in the preliminary round versus hosts Israel, Italy, Ukraine, Germany and clinched the first place in the group, however after traveling to Istanbul for the knockout stage the Lithuanians lost a quarterfinal to Greece (64–77) and finished the championship ninth.

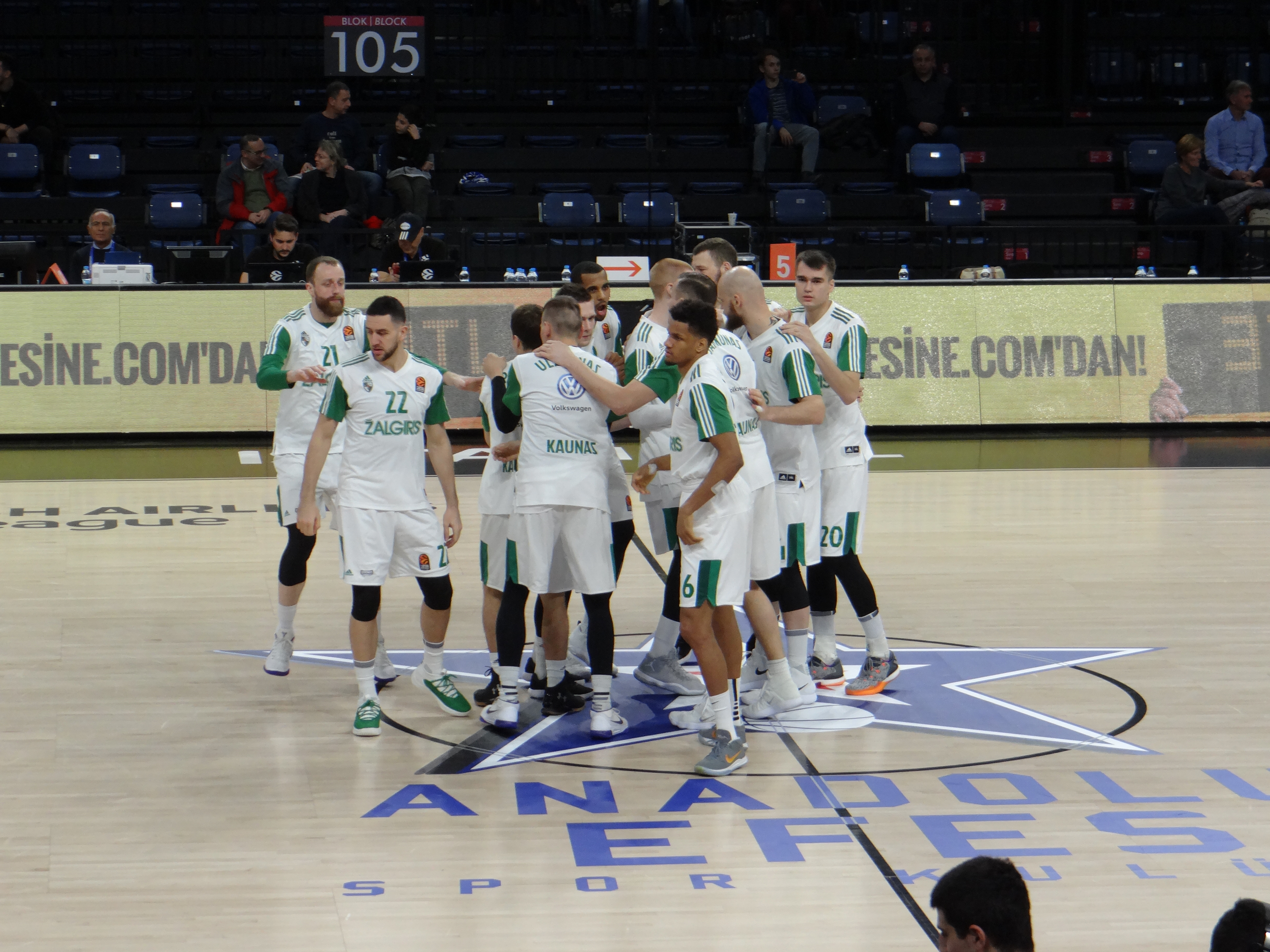
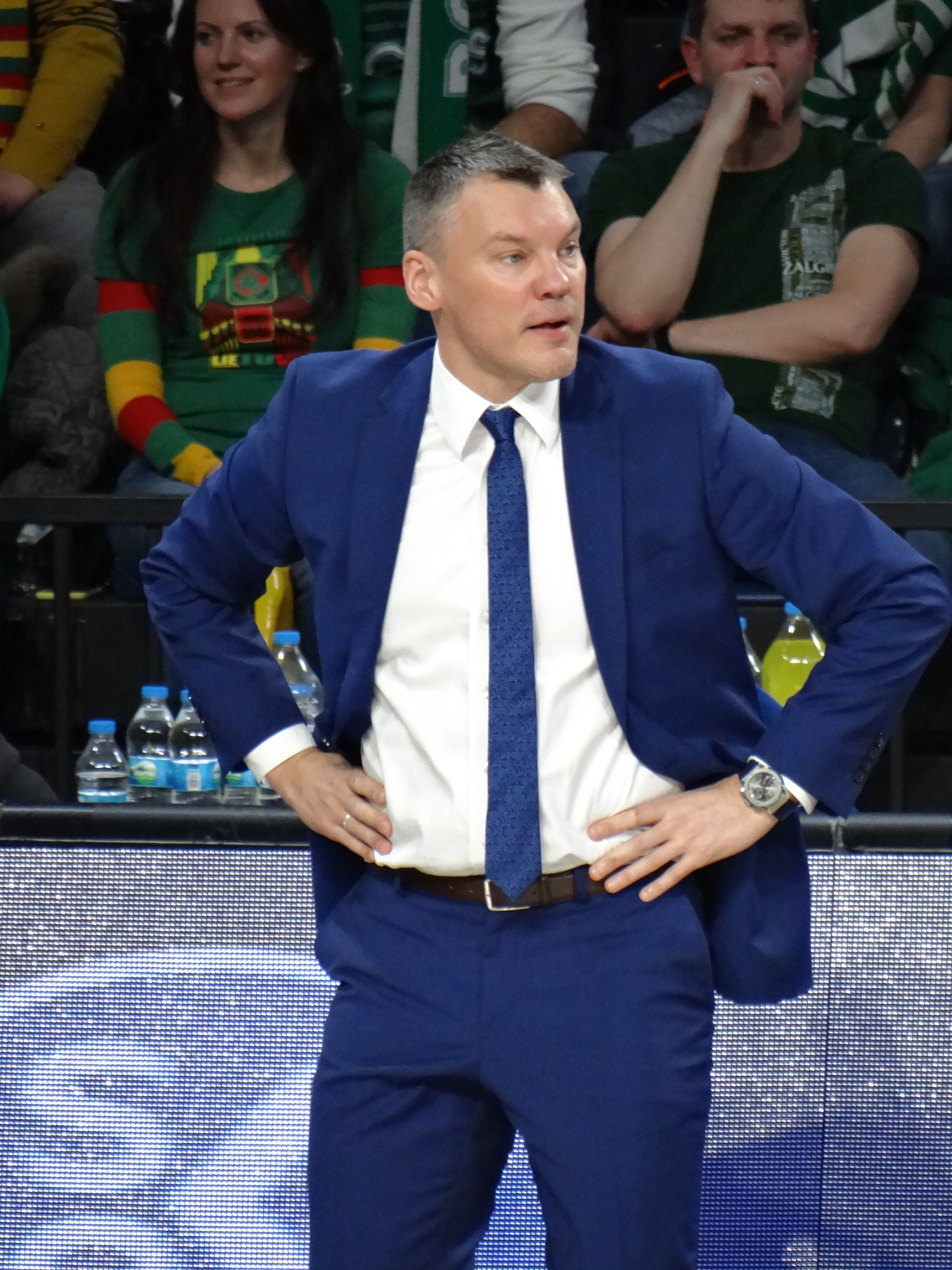
Žalgiris Kaunas players (left) and coach Šarūnas Jasikevičius (right), who finished third in the 2018 EuroLeague Final Four

In the 2018 EuroLeague Playoffs BC Žalgiris, coached by Jasikevičius, defeated Olympiacos B.C. 1–3 and for the first time since 1999 advanced to the Final Four where they lost (67–76) in the semi-final to Fenerbahçe Doğuş, but eventually finished third by defeating (77–79) their historic rival PBC CSKA Moscow.

In the 2019 FIBA U16 Women's European Championship the Lithuanians became vice-champions (lost final to Russia, 66–73). However, the EuroBasket Women 2019 qualification was another disastrous performance for the Lithuanian women as they failed to qualify for the EuroBasket Women 2019. During it FIBA youth competitions star (2019 FIBA U16 Women's European Championship vice-champion) Justė Jocytė debuted in the senior Lithuania's women's national team being just 13 year old.

The mediocre performance at last year's EuroBasket meant that the Lithuanians had to participate in the qualification to the 2019 FIBA Basketball World Cup, where the Lithuanians finished the first round with a 6–0 record and the second round with a 11–1 record and qualified to the World Cup. In the preliminary round of the 2019 FIBA Basketball World Cup the Lithuanian team defeated Senegal, Canada and lost to Australia), while in the second round they lost to France and defeated Dominican Republic, however it was not enough for the Lithuanians to qualify to the knockout stage and they finished ninth. Following it, coach Adomaitis resigned and was replaced by Darius Maskoliūnas.

==== 2020s ====
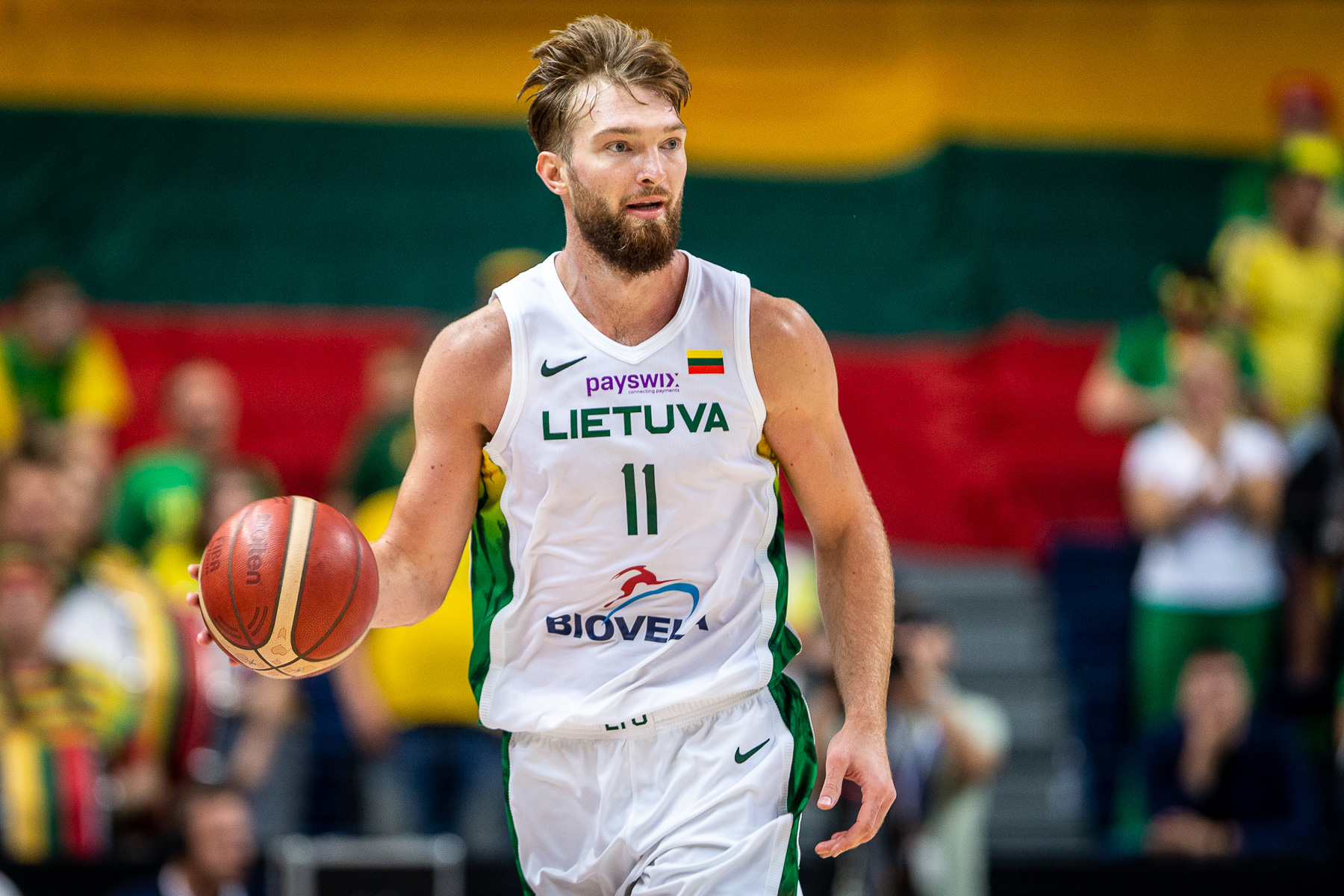
Domantas Sabonis, a three-times NBA All-Star (2020, 2021, 2023), playing for the Lithuania men's national team in 2022

In 2020, the Lithuanian Basketball Hall (Lithuanian: Lietuvos krepšinio namai), which features a Lithuanian basketball museum and serves as a venue for basketball-related events (e.g. conferences, ceremonies, etc.), was opened in Kaunas, Lithuania.

One of the 2020 FIBA Men's Olympic Qualifying Tournaments was held at the Žalgiris Arena in Kaunas, Lithuania. At the tournament, Lithuania defeated Venezuela, South Korea and Poland, before losing the finals to Slovenia (85–96), largely due to Luka Dončić who had 42 efficiency points in this game. This was the first time when the Lithuania men's national team failed to qualify to the Olympics after the restoration of Lithuania's independence in 1990. Following it, Maskoliūnas resigned and was replaced by Kazys Maksvytis.

Lithuania failed to qualify for EuroBasket Women 2021.

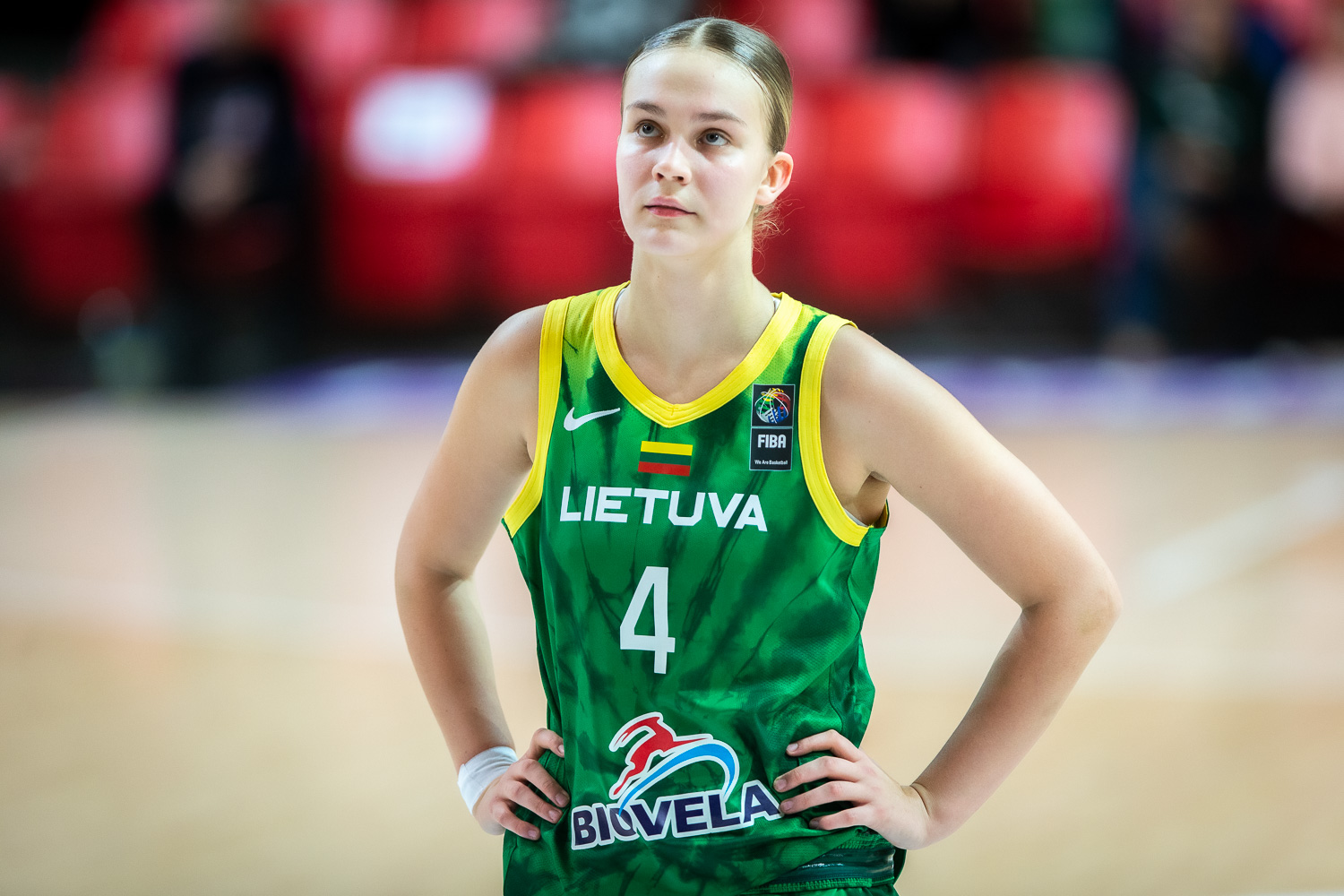
Justė Jocytė, the highest female Lithuanian WNBA draft pick (#5 in 2025), since the EuroBasket Women 2025 qualification became the leader of the Lithuania women's national basketball team

In August 2022, the Lithuania men's national under-16 team won the 2022 FIBA U16 European Championship. The same summer, the Lithuania women's national under-18 team won the 2022 FIBA U18 Women's European Championship, while their leader Justė Jocytė was selected as the most valuable player of the tournament.

The Lithuania men's national team qualified for EuroBasket 2022 through the EuroBasket 2022 qualification. In EuroBasket 2022, Lithuania finished the preliminary round in a fourth place out of six teams (defeated Hungary, Bosnia and Herzegovina, but lost to Slovenia, France, Germany after 2OT) and advanced to the knockout stage. There, they lost the Round of 16 to eventual champions Spain in overtime (102–94) largely because of Lorenzo Brown who scored 28 points for Spain. Lithuania finished EuroBasket 2022 at 15th place, which was an all-time low.

In 2023, the 2023 EuroLeague Final Four was held at the Žalgiris Arena in Kaunas, Lithuania. However, BC Žalgiris did not participate in it as it was eliminated 3–0 by FC Barcelona Bàsquet in the 2023 EuroLeague Playoffs.

During the EuroBasket Women 2023 qualification the Lithuanians failed to qualify for a fourth straight EuroBasket.

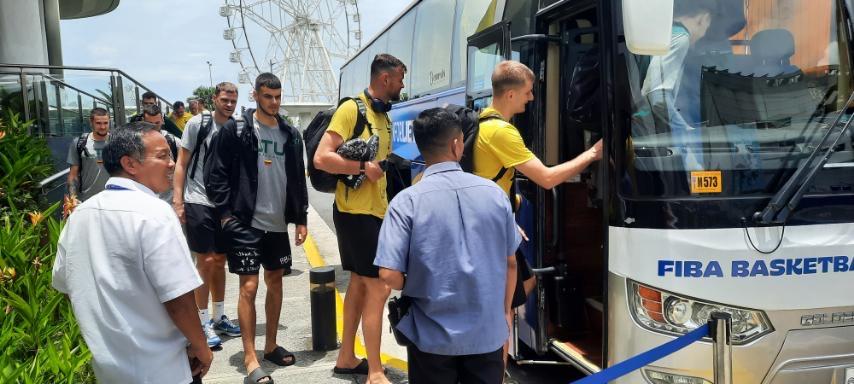
The Lithuania men's national team members boarding a bus at the 2023 FIBA World Cup during which they defeated the United States men's national team for a third time in history, but eventually finished sixth

The Lithuania men's national team qualified through the 2023 FIBA Basketball World Cup qualification to the 2023 FIBA Basketball World Cup. The Lithuanians in the first round crushed by over 20 points all three opponents (Egypt, Mexico, Montenegro) and in the second round also remained undefeated by winning versus Greece and notably defeating for a third time in history the United States men's national team (led by four NBA All-Stars Anthony Edwards, Jaren Jackson Jr., Brandon Ingram, Tyrese Haliburton). However, in the quarterfinal the Lithuanians journey towards a medal was stopped by Serbia (68–87) and the Lithuanians finished sixth by winning versus Slovenia and losing to Latvia.

In order to qualify for the 2024 Olympics the Lithuania men's national team competed in the Olympic Qualifying Tournament in San Juan, Puerto Rico. One of the key long-term players Valančiūnas missed the tournament. In the preliminary round the Lithuanians defeated Mexico, Ivory Coast and in the semi-final crushed Italy, however in the final they faced off hosts Puerto Rico to who they lost (68–79) and did not qualify to second straight Olympics. Following it, coach Maksvytis resigned and was replaced by Rimas Kurtinaitis.

The Lithuania men's national 3x3 team won bronze medal in the 2024 Olympics.

In the 2025 WNBA draft Jocytė was drafted in the first round with a fifth pick, which is the all-time highest WNBA draft pick for a Lithuanian women basketball player.

In the EuroBasket Women 2025 qualification the Lithuania women's national team finally qualified for the EuroBasket Women 2025, marking the end of a disastrous streak, and in the preliminary round won versus Slovenia, Serbia, but lost to hosts Italy, and advanced to the knockout stage where in the quarter-final they lost to France (83–61) and eventually finished eighth.

The Lithuania men's national team qualified through the EuroBasket 2025 qualification to the EuroBasket 2025 where they finished the group stage with a 4–1 result (won versus Great Britain, Montenegro, hosts Finland, Sweden, lost to the 2023 world champions, Germany), but in it Lithuania's leader Rokas Jokubaitis suffered a tournament-ending injury, then in the Round of 16 the Lithuanians defeated hosts Latvia (88–79), but in the quarterfinal they lost to Greece (76–87), led by a Greek superstar Giannis Antetokounmpo, and finished fifth.

On May 10, 2026, Rytas Vilnius won the Basketball Champions League.

The Lithuania men's national 3x3 team won gold medal in the 2025 FIBA 3x3 Europe Cup.

On October 15, 2026, the Seimas officially announced April 23 as the Day of Basketball, commemorating the first official basketball game played in Lithuania on April 23, 1922.

==== Attendances ====
The Lithuanian basketball club with the highest average home league attendance per league season:

#	Club	League	Average
2024-25	BC Žalgiris	EuroLeague	14,895
2023-24	BC Žalgiris	EuroLeague	14,773

== Notable players (men) ==
=== Notable Lithuania men's national basketball team members ===
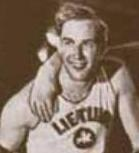
Pranas Talzūnas

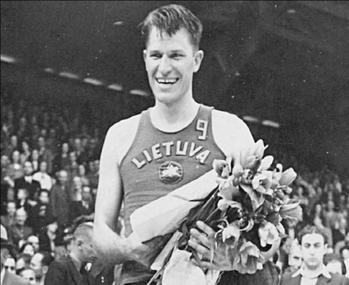
Pranas Lubinas

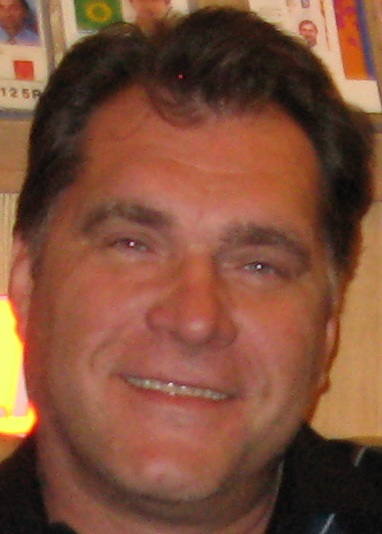
Arvydas Sabonis

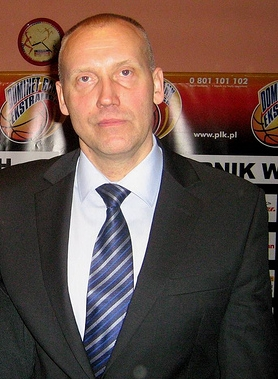
Rimas Kurtinaitis

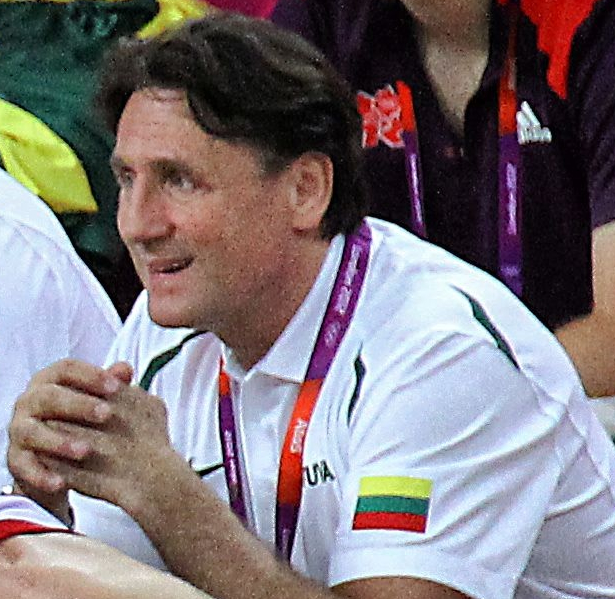
Valdemaras Chomičius

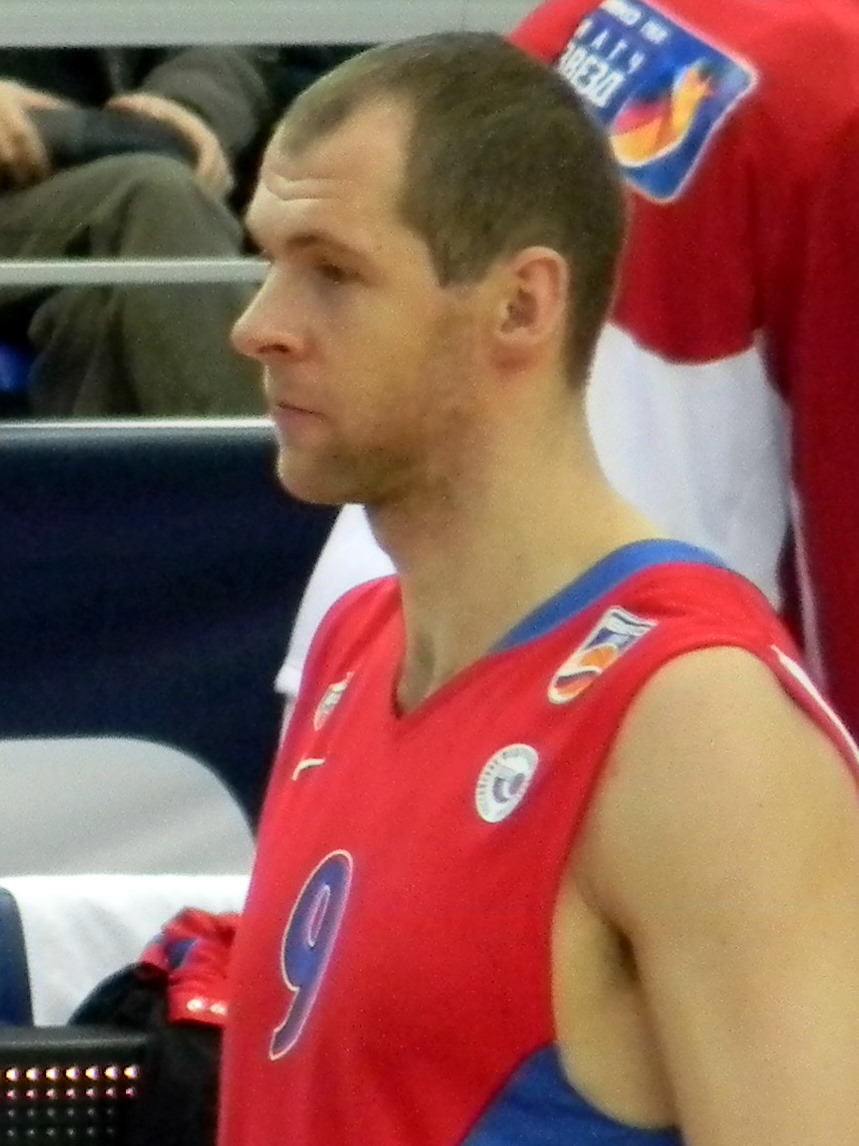
Ramūnas Šiškauskas

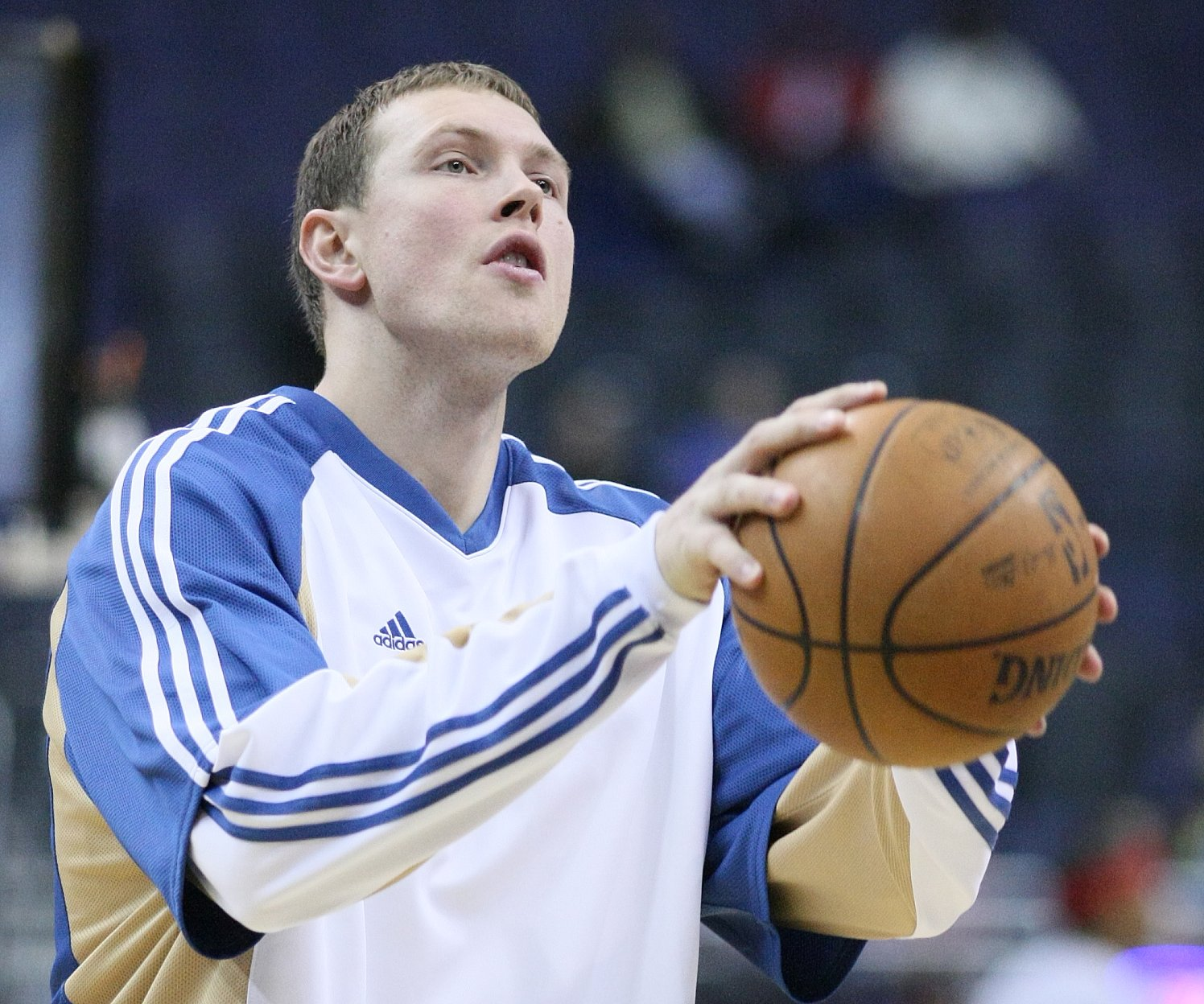
Darius Songaila

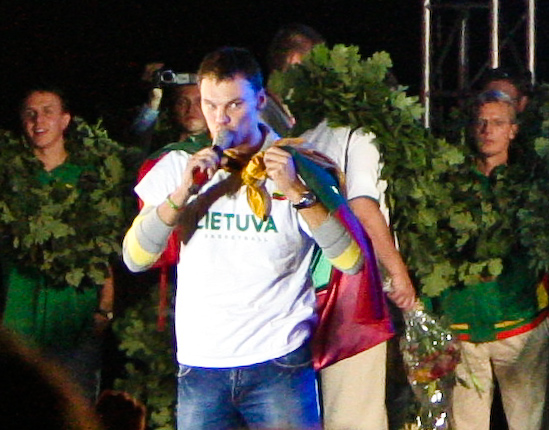
Šarūnas Jasikevičius

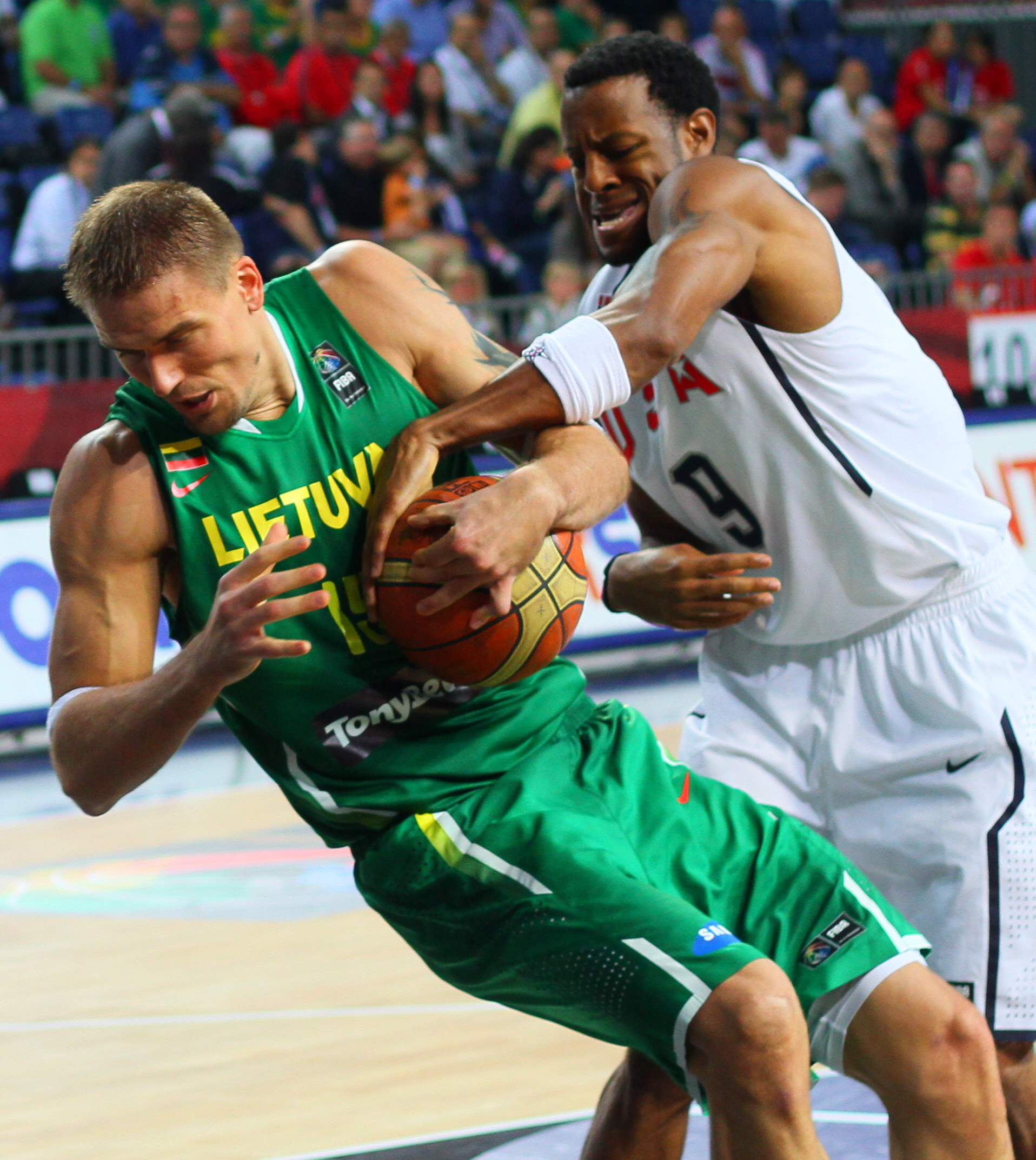
Robertas Javtokas

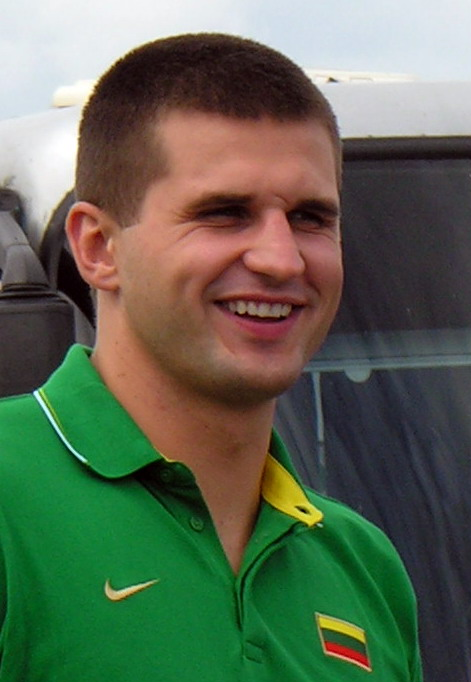
Linas Kleiza

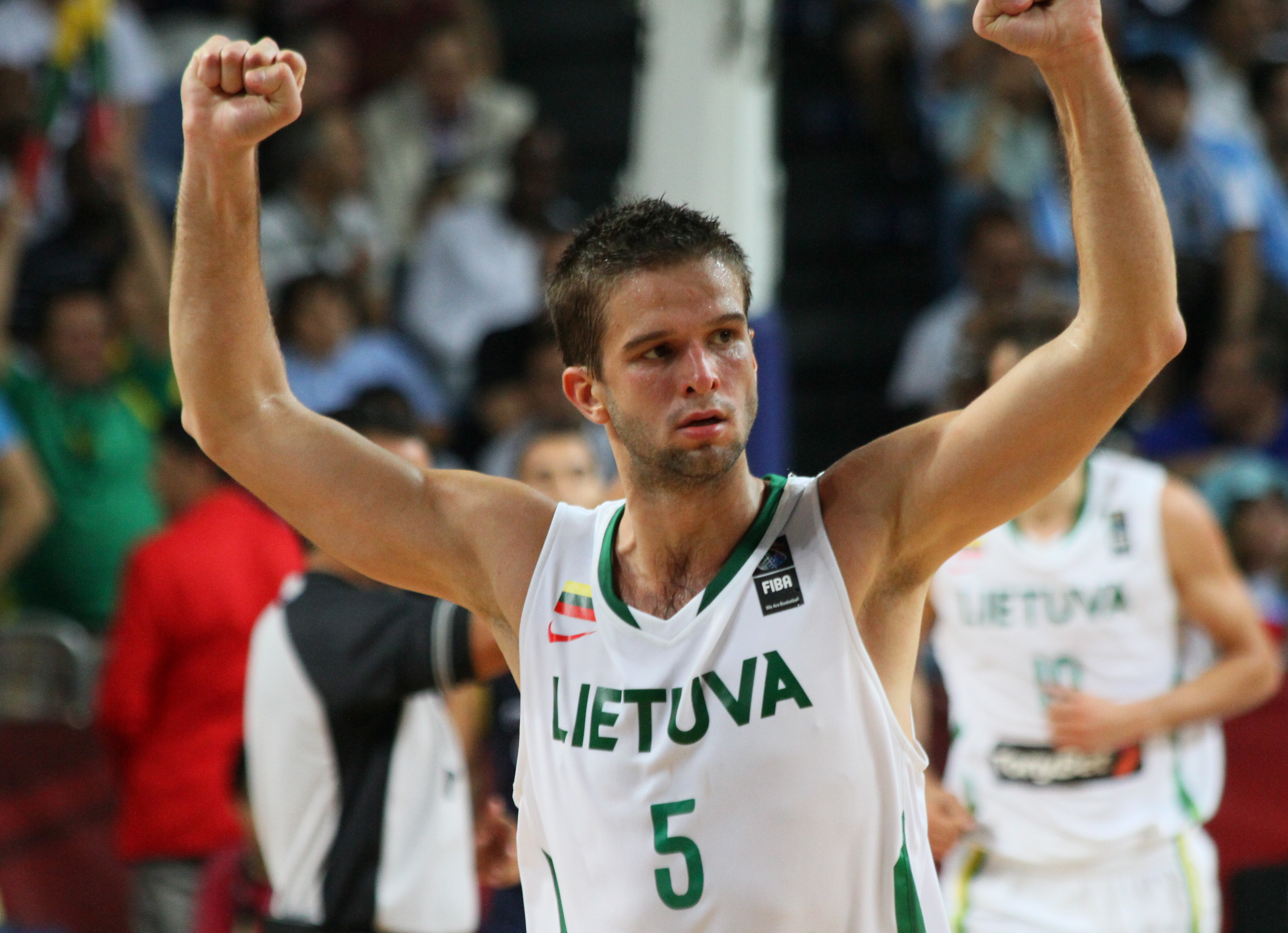
Mantas Kalnietis

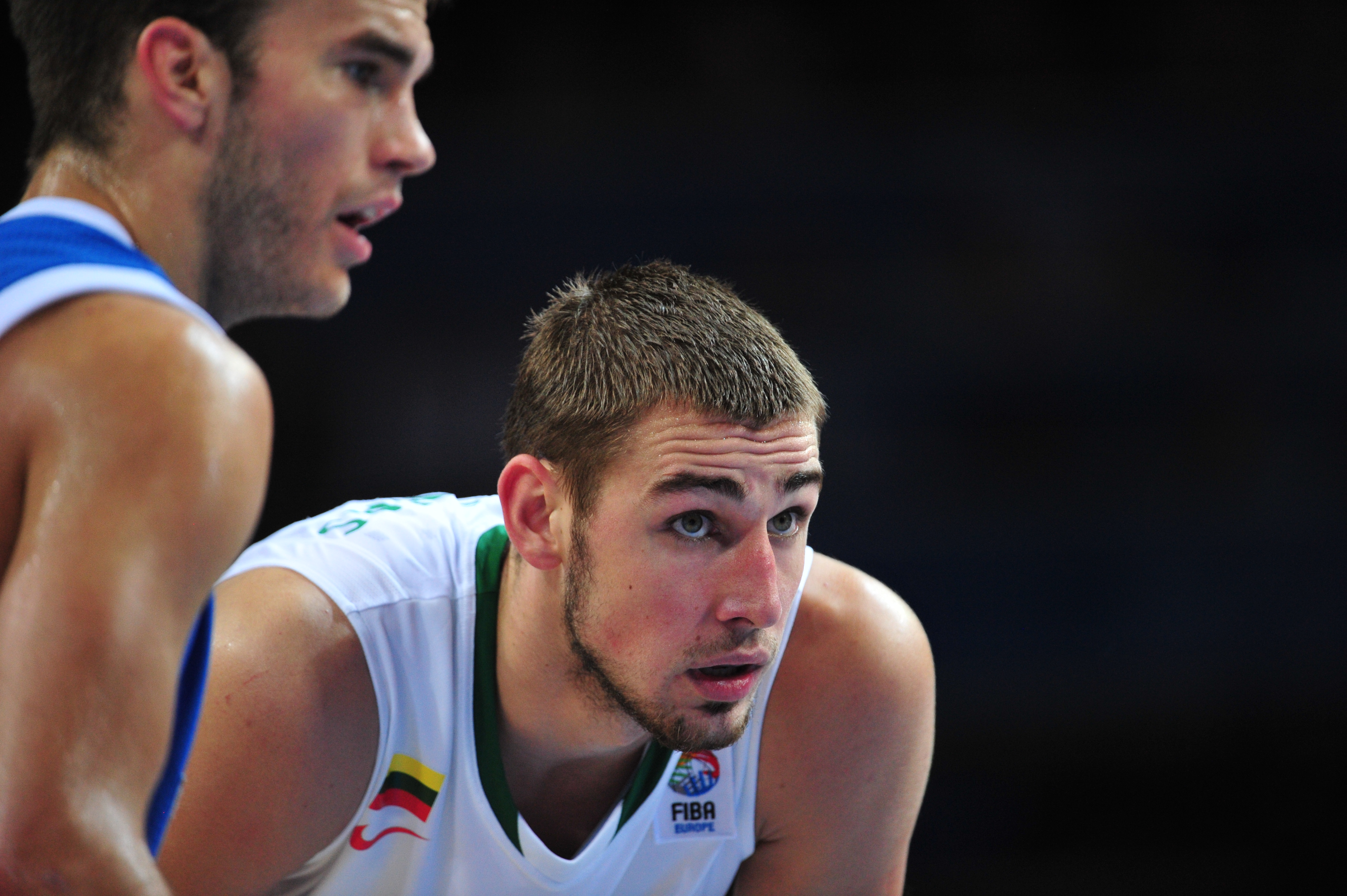
Jonas Valančiūnas

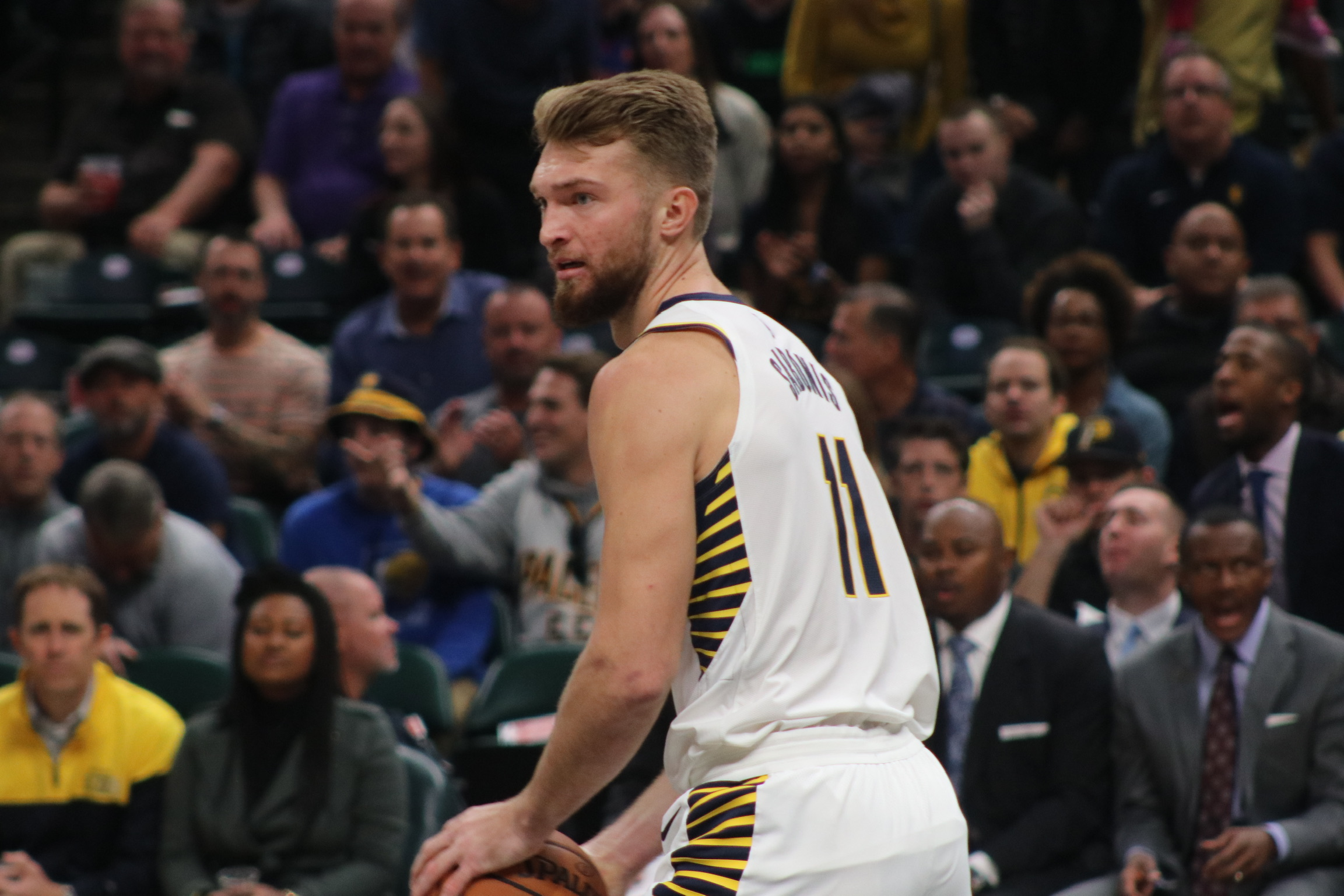
Domantas Sabonis

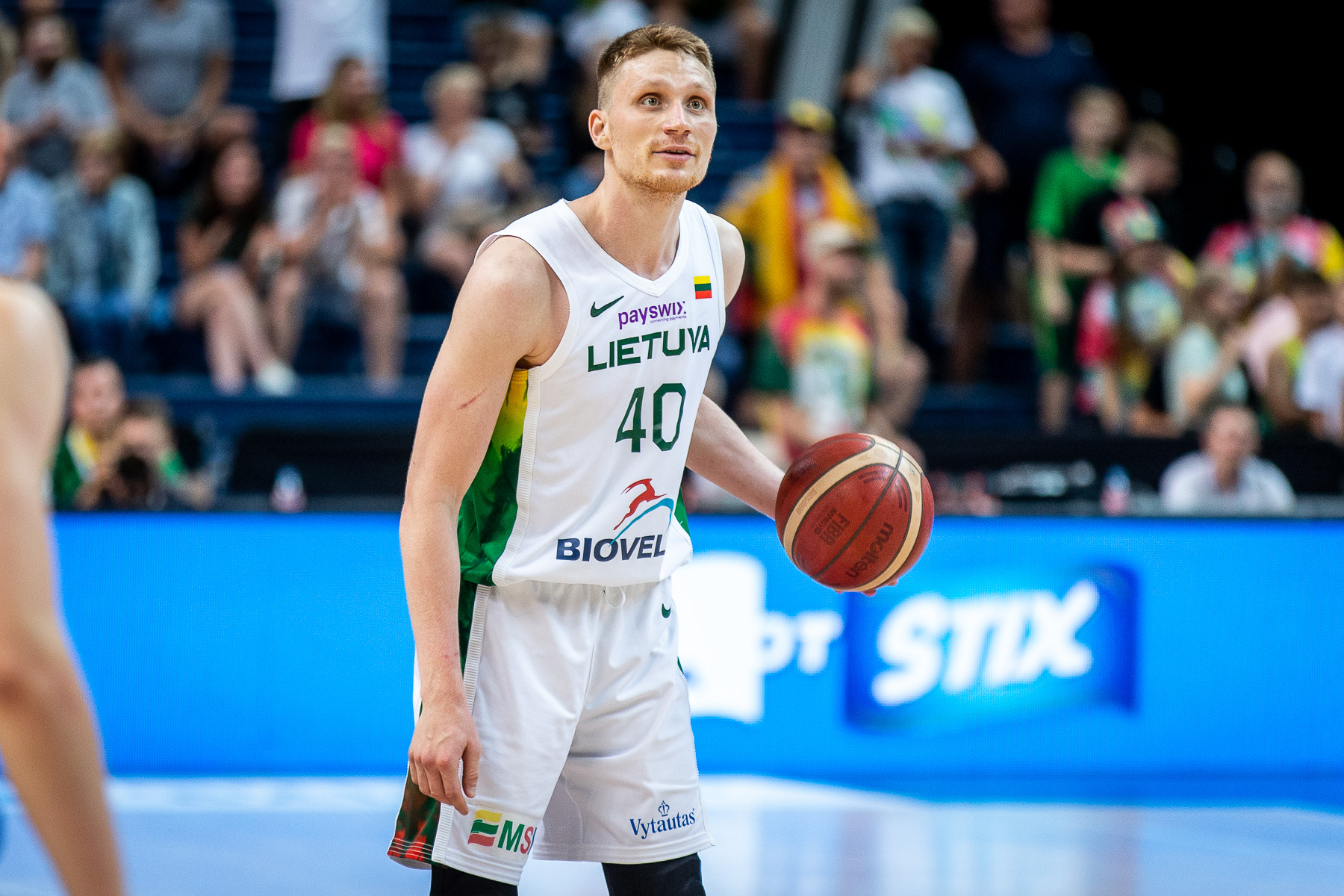
Marius Grigonis

Name	Position	Years	PPG	RPG	APG	Remarks
Feliksas Kriaučiūnas		1937, 1939	3.4^{‡}	N/A	N/A	Notable for his efforts in coaching and popularizing basketball in Lithuania during the late 1930s. He also firmly contributed in developing nowadays basketball in Lithuania.
Pranas Talzūnas		1937	12.2^{‡}	N/A	N/A	Led the team during EuroBasket 1937 and was named MVP of the tournament. Talzūnas is regarded as the first player to use hook shot.
Leonas Baltrūnas		1937, 1939	4.5^{‡}	N/A	N/A	Not very famous for his contributions during the European championships in points, but is very remarkable in the Lithuanian sport and especially the Lithuanian Australian sport history. He has firmly contributing in popularizing the sport there, being the organizer of the first Lithuanian Australian Sport Games in 1950. The games are still ongoing nowadays. He also was the Australian national team coach in 1955.
Pranas Lubinas	Center	1939	13.17^{‡}	N/A	N/A	Popularized the sport in Lithuania in the late 1930s. He was de facto MVP of EuroBasket 1939 (not officially awarded due to him being too tall). As a result, Lubinas is often regarded as the "grandfather of Lithuanian basketball". Before playing for Lithuania squad, Pranas Lubinas won the gold medal at the inaugural basketball Olympic tournament in 1936 as Team USA captain.
Mykolas Ruzgys		1939	10.2^{‡}	N/A	N/A	The official EuroBasket 1939 MVP. Pranas Lubinas was unable to receive the award due to his height. Later he coached the Spanish National Team during the 1950 FIBA World Championship in Argentina.
Vytautas Budriūnas		1939	10.4^{‡}	N/A	N/A	One of the hook shot pioneers, also notable for his one-handed jump shot.
Juozas Jurgėla		1939	4.2^{‡}	N/A	N/A	One of the key players in EuroBasket 1939. Noted for impressive dribbling and passing.
Sergejus Jovaiša	Small forward	1992	3.1^{‡}	0.3	0.3	Jovaiša won most of his titles with the Soviet Union men's national team, but he also was member of the first post-independence Lithuania men's national basketball team, winning a bronze at the 1992 Olympics.
Arvydas Sabonis	Center	1992, 1995–1996, 1999	20.00	11.4	2.2	One of the best known Lithuanian basketball players, who won the 1988 Summer Olympic Games with the Soviet Union men's national team, and subsequently helped Lithuania men's national team to win two Olympic bronze medals in 1992 and 1996, plus a European silver in 1995. He was a large contributor to the successful Portland Trail Blazers teams from 1995 to 2003. He was inducted into the FIBA and Naismith Hall of Fame. His son Domantas successfully play in the NBA, becoming an NBA All-Star three times, and was picked for the Lithuanian squad multiple times. Arvydas and Domantas Sabonis are the first father-son duo in the Lithuania national team's history.
Šarūnas Marčiulionis	Point guard Shooting guard	1992, 1995–1996	20.15	4.1	6.4	One of the key players in the 1992 and 1996 Olympics and 1995 EuroBasket, being named tournament MVP of the latter. He helped resurrect the Lithuania national team before the 1992 Barcelona Olympics. Marčiulionis is the first NBA player in Lithuania history and is also famous for bringing Euro step move to the NBA. In 2014, he was inducted into the Basketball Hall of Fame. His son Augustas Marčiulionis also played for the Lithuania national team and they are the second father-son duo in its history.
Rimas Kurtinaitis	Small forward Shooting guard	1992, 1995–1996	13.80	1.3	1.0	Outstanding three-point shooter. He is the only non-NBA player who participated in the NBA All-Star Three-Point Contest. He became the Summer Olympic Games champion with the Soviet Union men's national team in 1988. While player for the Lithuania men's national team he won two Summer Olympic Games bronze medals (1992, 1996) and one EuroBasket silver medal (1995). In 2024, he was selected as the head coach of the Lithuania men's national team.
Valdemaras Chomičius	Point guard	1992, 1995	10.30	1.2	1.6	Won most of his titles with the Soviet Union, notably the 1988 Summer Olympic Games, but also was part of the Lithuania men's national team during the 1992 Olympics (bronze medal) and 1995 EuroBasket (silver medal) before retirement as a player.
Gintaras Einikis	Center	1992, 1995–2001	9.8	4.5	0.7	Famous for his trademark hook shot, Einikis is the all-time most capped Lithuanian (106 games), as well as the only player winning three Summer Olympic Games bronze medals (1992, 1996, 2000). Gintaras also participated in four EuroBaskets, winning silver medals in 1995 and 2001.
Artūras Karnišovas	Small forward Power forward	1992, 1995–1999	18.10	4.9	2.5	Lithuania's all-time leader in points (total 1453 points), won two Olympic Summer Games bronze medals (1992, 1996) and the EuroBasket silver in 1995. He averaged 18.1 points per game in all of his tournaments combined. On 15 June 2017, he became general manager of the Denver Nuggets and is the first Lithuanian in such position.
Saulius Štombergas	Small forward Power forward	1995–2001, 2003–2004	11	3.2	1.2	One of the best three-point shooters in Lithuania basketball history. He also was team captain during the EuroBasket 2003 title. Moreover, he won silver medal during the EuroBasket 1995 and two bronze medals during the Summer Olympic Games (1996, 2000) with the Lithuania men's national team and was also part of the BC Žalgiris team that won the 1999 EuroLeague.
Mindaugas Žukauskas	Small forward Power forward	1996–1999, 2001, 2003–2006	4.9	2.2	1.3	A long time Lithuania men's national basketball team captain, known for his aggressive defense. He won gold medal with Lithuania during the EuroBasket 2003 and bronze medal during the 1996 Summer Olympic Games.
Eurelijus Žukauskas	Center	1996–2001, 2003–2004	5.6	4.3	0.6	Outstanding defender and shot blocker. He won a gold medal for Lithuania at EuroBasket 2003, and was also part of the BC Žalgiris team that won the 1999 EuroLeague. He also won two Summer Olympic Games bronze medals (1996, 2000).
Šarūnas Jasikevičius	Point guard	1997–2001, 2003–2004, 2007–2008, 2011–2012	9.6	2.3	4.9	One of the most famous Lithuania's basketball players in the history, noted for his excellent playmaking. He led Lithuania to its third gold medal in EuroBasket 2003, being named MVP of that tournament. He also won a bronze medal at the 2000 Olympics, and led Lithuania in a notable win versus Team USA at the 2004 Summer Olympics, scoring 28 points (7/12 three-pointers). Moreover, he won EuroBasket bronze medal in 2007. Jasikevičius won the EuroLeague four times as a player and played in the NBA. In 2015, Jasikevičius was named as one of the EuroLeague Legends. Following his retirement as a player, he became a successful coach, notably achieving the European Basketball Triple Crown as a head coach in 2025.
Rimantas Kaukėnas	Shooting guard	2001, 2007–2008, 2011–2012	8.9	2.1	1.5	Notable for his scoring ability. One of the key players in EuroBasket 2007 during which the Lithuania men's national team won bronze medals. Kaukėnas number 13 was retired by Montepaschi Siena in 2009.
Ramūnas Šiškauskas	Point guard Shooting guard Small forward	2000–2001, 2003–2005, 2007–2008	12.9	3.2	2.1	A long time Lithuania men's national basketball team captain, nicknamed "Baltic Pippen" for his outstanding efficiency on court. In 2014, Šiškauskas was named as one of the EuroLeague Legends. In total while representing the Lithuania men's national team he won two EuroBasket medals (gold in 2003 and bronze in 2007) and one Summer Olympic Games bronze medal (2000).
Darius Songaila	Power forward Center	2000–2001, 2003–2004, 2006–2007, 2011–2012	8.7	3.9	0.8	A long time NBA and Lithuania men's national team player. One of the key players in EuroBasket 2003. In total while representing the Lithuania men's national team he won two EuroBasket medals (gold in 2003 and bronze in 2007) and one Summer Olympic Games bronze medal (2000).
Arvydas Macijauskas	Shooting guard	2003–2004, 2006	14.7	2.8	1.5	Outstanding three-point shooter, earning the nickname "Kalashnikov", and one of the key players in EuroBasket 2003.
Kšyštof Lavrinovič	Power forward Center	2003–2009, 2011, 2013–2014	7.1	4.2	0.8	An all-around power forward noted for his efficiency on court. He and his twin brother Darjuš are the first Lithuanian Poles to represent Lithuania men's national team. In total while representing the Lithuania men's national team he won three EuroBasket medals (gold in 2003, silver in 2013, and bronze in 2007).
Darjuš Lavrinovič	Center	2005–2009, 2013–2014	7.6	3.3	0.8	An all-around versatile center. In total while representing the Lithuania men's national team he won two EuroBasket medals (silver in 2013 and bronze in 2007).
Robertas Javtokas	Center	2001, 2004–2013, 2015–2016	4.8	3.7	0.5	A long time Lithuania men's national basketball team captain notable for his efficient defense and devotion to the team, not quitting games despite pain and various injuries. Javtokas is also famous for a world dunking record, dunking into a 3.65 m high basket in 2001. In total while representing the Lithuania men's national team he won two EuroBasket silver medals (2013, 2015), one EuroBasket bronze medal (2007), and one FIBA World Cup bronze medal (2010).
Linas Kleiza	Power forward	2006–2010, 2012–2013	13.0	5.6	1.1	Led the team in the 2010 World Championship (he was included into the All-Tournament Team) and the 2012 Olympics. Kleiza is also the Lithuanian who scored the most points in an NBA game, with 41 in 2008. In 2013, Kleiza signed with Fenerbahçe Ülker and became the most expensive player in Turkish Basketball Super League history, as well as the best paid basketball player in that season's EuroLeague. In total while representing the Lithuania men's national team he won one EuroBasket silver medal (2013), one EuroBasket bronze medal (2007), and one FIBA World Cup bronze medal (2010).
Mantas Kalnietis	Point guard Shooting guard	2006, 2009–2013, 2015–2017, 2019, 2021	9.9	2.5	5.1	Led the team in EuroBasket 2013 while being the tournament's leader in assists (5 per game), and the follow-up EuroBaskets in 2015 (7.8 assists per game) and 2017 (7.2 assists per game). In total while representing the Lithuania men's national team he won two EuroBasket silver medals (2013, 2015), and one FIBA World Cup bronze medal (2010). Following the retirement of Javtokas, Kalnietis was captain of the Lithuania men's national team for many tournaments in 2017–2021.
Jonas Mačiulis	Small forward	2007, 2008–2010, 2012–2017, 2019, 2021	7.2	3.8	1.3	Led the team during the critical moments in EuroBasket 2015 and was included into the All-Tournament Team. In total while representing the Lithuania men's national team he won two EuroBasket silver medals (2013, 2015), one EuroBasket bronze medal (2007), and one FIBA World Cup bronze medal (2010).
Jonas Valančiūnas	Center	2011–2017, 2019, 2021–2023, 2025	11.9	7.4	0.9	The first major star born in post-Soviet Lithuania. Before making his debut with the senior national team at 19, he led Lithuania youth basketball teams to three gold medals and was named MVP of all three tournaments. He's also the Lithuanian picked the highest on the NBA draft, being fifth overall at the 2011 NBA draft. The same year he debuted in Lithuania men's national team, being a key players in EuroBasket 2011. On 20 August 2015, Valančiūnas signed a record four-year $64 million deal with the Toronto Raptors and became the all-time best paid Lithuanian in history. He was captain of the Lithuania men's national team for many years since 2022.
Mindaugas Kuzminskas	Small forward	2013–2017, 2019, 2021–2025	8.3	3.5	1.1	In 2016, he signed with the New York Knicks and had played in the NBA. While playing for the Lithuania men's national team he won two EuroBasket silver medals (2013, 2015).
Domantas Sabonis	Power forward Center	2015–2016, 2019, 2021–2024	10.0	6.2	2.0	Son of the Lithuanian legend Arvydas Sabonis. Domantas is the all-time youngest Lithuanian to debut in a game representing the primary men's national team. He is also second highest drafted Lithuanian in history, picked 11th overall in 2016 by the Orlando Magic. On 21 January 2020, Sabonis became the first Lithuanian in NBA history to record a triple-double. On 30 January 2020, Sabonis was chosen to the 2020 NBA All-Star Game and became only the second Lithuanian to be chosen as an NBA All-Star. He was also selected as an NBA All-Star in 2021 and 2023.
Marius Grigonis	Shooting guard Small forward	2016–2017, 2019, 2021–2024	9.8	3.1	2.8	Lithuania men's national team's captain and vice-captain in 2022, captain in 2024. Known for points scoring ability.

=== Notable Lithuanians who never played for Lithuania men's national basketball team ===
There have been a few notable Lithuanians who never played for the Lithuania men's national basketball team in FIBA-organized tournaments or the Olympic Games. Most of those lived in the Lithuanian Soviet Socialist Republic, who only competed independently in tournaments between the Republics of the Soviet Union.

Name	Professional career	Reason	Remarks
Vytautas Kulakauskas	1944–1949	Soviet Union occupation	EuroBasket 1947 champion with the Soviet Union.
Stepas Butautas	1944–1956	Soviet Union occupation	Legendary Žalgiris and Lithuania player, coach. As part of the Soviet Union, won an Olympic silver medal in 1952 and three EuroBaskets in 1947, 1951, and 1953. He was named as one of FIBA's 50 Greatest Players.
Vincas Sercevičius	1944–1951	Nazi Germany, Soviet Union occupations	Legendary Žalgiris player, two times USSR tournament champion. He was a peerless center, outstanding hook shots specialist with his both hands. Often nicknamed "second Lubinas". Survived the Nazi occupation, and after the war, wound up blacklisted by the Soviet government for rebellious activities and thus vetoed for possible inclusion in the Soviet Union national team.
Justinas Lagunavičius	1944–1957	Soviet Union occupation	As part of the Soviet Union, won an Olympic silver medal in 1952 and three EuroBaskets in 1947, 1951, and 1953.
Kazys Petkevičius	1945–1962	Soviet Union occupation	Legendary Žalgiris and Lithuania player, coach. Won Olympic silver medals twice in 1952 and 1956, was European champion in 1947, and won a EuroBasket bronze in 1955.
Algirdas Lauritėnas	1950–1963	Soviet Union occupation	Olympic silver medalist in 1956, EuroBasket gold medalist twice (1953, 1957) and EuroBasket bronze medalist in 1955.
Stanislovas Stonkus	1950–1958	Soviet Union occupation	Olympic silver medalist twice in 1952 and 1956, EuroBasket title in 1957 and bronze in 1955.
Modestas Paulauskas	1962–1976	Soviet Union occupation	One of the greatest Lithuanian basketballers ever. Paulauskas was captain of the USSR team who won the Olympic gold in 1972, the World Championships of 1967 and 1974, and four EuroBaskets (1965, as the Most Valuable Player, 1967, 1969, 1971). Also got an Olympic bronze in 1968 and a European bronze medal in 1973. Named one of FIBA's 50 Greatest Players. In 2021, he was included into the FIBA Hall of Fame.
Gediminas Budnikas	1964–1973	Soviet Union occupation	Notable Žalgiris big man, never represented Soviet Union and Žalgiris in foreign countries (except USSR members) as both of his parents were members of the armed anti-Soviet resistance movement.
Algirdas Linkevičius	1968–1982	Soviet Union occupation	Outstanding three-pointers specialist, legendary Žalgiris player. Linkevičius played 81 games for Lithuania national team, but only in USSR-organized tournaments. Was denied entry in the Soviet Union team for being born in Siberia, where his parents were deported.
Algimantas Pavilonis	1973–1985	Soviet Union occupation	Legendary Statyba player. LKF president in 1994–2001.
Žydrūnas Ilgauskas	1994–2011	Personal circumstances, injuries	One of the most successful Lithuanian NBA players, being the first Lithuanian to participate in NBA All-Star game (twice, 2003, 2005). Despite impressive NBA career, he never played for the Lithuanian national team in official major tournaments due to various personal circumstances or injuries. Closest approach was in 2008, when Ilgauskas showed interest in playing the Olympics and the LKF even raised the US$22 million insurance requested by the Cleveland Cavaliers, but the Cavaliers still vetoed due to his injuries history. His only appearance with the national team jersey was 3 games in 1995 Eurobasket qualification phase when he scored 23 points in total. Ilgauskas #11 jersey was retired by the Cavaliers on 8 March 2014, being only the third European to be honored this way. Ilgauskas permanently became ineligible to play for the Lithuanian national team upon acquiring American citizenship in 2013, thus relinquishing his Lithuanian citizenship, although by this time he had retired.

=== Notable Lithuanian descent basketball players ===
Due to various reasons (especially because of the World Wars) many Lithuanians left their country. As a result of this, there is a group of notable basketball players of Lithuanian descent. A few even expressed interest in playing for the Lithuanian squad.

Name	Professional career	Position	Remarks
Matt Guokas, Sr.	1938–1947	Shooting guard Small forward	Former ABL and BAA (a precursor to the NBA) player. BAA champion in 1947. Guokas and his son, Matt Jr., were the first father-son duo to win NBA championships as players.
Victorio Cieslinskas	?–?	?	Born in Marijampolė, Lithuania. Represented the Uruguay men's national basketball team at the 1948 Summer Olympics (5th place) and 1952 Summer Olympics (bronze medalist).
Stan Dargis	?–?	?	Born in Palanga, Lithuania. Represented the Australia men's national basketball team at the 1956 Summer Olympics, teammate of Ignatavicius.
Algis Ignatavicius	?–?	?	Born in Kaunas, Lithuania. Represented the Australia men's national basketball team at the 1956 Summer Olympics, teammate of Dargis.
Waldemar Blatskauskas	?–?	?	Lithuanian Brazilian, who was born in a Lithuanian emigrants family and represented the Brazil men's national basketball team in many tournaments, most notably the 1960 Summer Olympics (bronze medalist) and FIBA World Cup of 1959 and 1963 (both times world champion).
Tony Kaseta	1946–1948	Center	Former PBLA and NBL player.
Al Guokas	1948–1950	Forward	Former NBA player.
Ray Ragelis	1951–1952	Small Forward Power Forward	Ragelis was born on 10 December 1928, to a family of Lithuanian immigrants. He is a former NBA player.
Radvilas Gorauskas	?–?	Center	Lithuanian Brazilian, who was born in Lithuania in 1941, but with his family emigrated during the World War II and after settling in Piracicaba, Brazil in 1947 he represented the Brazil men's national basketball team at the 1972 Summer Olympics (7th place).
Rick Barry	1965–1980	Small forward	NBA champion in 1975, being chosen as Finals MVP. Inducted into the Naismith Memorial Basketball Hall of Fame in 1987, named one of the 50 Greatest Players in NBA History in 1996, eight time NBA All-Star, and four times ABA All-Star Game. Barry is the only player to lead the National Collegiate Athletic Association (NCAA), ABA and NBA in scoring for an individual season. His 30.5 points-per-game average in the ABA stands as the highest career total for a player in any professional basketball league.
Matt Guokas	1966–1976	Shooting guard Small forward	Former NBA player. NBA champion in 1967. Son of Matt Guokas, Sr.
Ed Palubinskas	1972–1976	Guard	Outstanding scorer for the Australian national team at the 1972 Summer Olympics (21.1 PPG) and 1976 Summer Olympics (31.3 PPG). During the 1976 Olympics Palubinskas achieved the record for most points scored in single Olympic Games (269), which later was surpassed by Oscar Schmidt but only after the introduction of the three-point line. Following his quick retirement from the professional sport, he became a basketball coach and was nicknamed as the "Freethrow master", whose clients were such NBA superstars as Shaquille O'Neal and Dwight Howard, he was also hired by Michael Jordan to work with Bismack Biyombo. Palubinskas holds a Guinness book world record for most free throws (8) made in 2 minutes blindfolded, performed in Phoenix, Arizona at NBA All-Star weekend.
Steve Puidokas	?–1982	Center	Born in a Lithuanian Americans family in Chicago, in 1995, Puidokas was a dominant center while playing for the Washington Cougars in 1973–1977, earning himself a nickname of Chicago's skyscraper. He was one of the first big men to be able to shoot away from the basket. Puidokas's #55 jersey was retired by the Cougars and for a long time was the only retired jersey of the team, until in 2020 Klay Thompson's jersey was also retired.
Chuck Aleksinas	1983–1990	Center	NCAA champion. Former NBA player. Never been a part of the Lithuania national team due to the same basketball citizenship rule issue as Arlauckas and Rautins.
Leo Rautins	1983–1993	Small forward	Former NBA player. Was unable to be a part of the Lithuanian squad due to the same citizenship rule violation as Arlauckas and Aleksinas. In 2014, Rautins said: "I still have Spanish newspaper with picture of me, Joe Arlauckas and Chuck Aleksinas - foreign-born Lithuanians who could have been in Lithuanian roster if not citizenship affairs".
Joe Arlauckas	1987–2000	Power forward	Former NBA player. EuroLeague champion in 1995, leading league's scorer in 1996. Despite being born in the Rochester, New York, Arlauckas was interested in playing for the Lithuanian squad during his tenure with Real Madrid together with Sabonis and Kurtinaitis, however he never did that because the basketball citizenship rules from the period required three years playing in Lithuania.
Jon Barry	1992–2006	Shooting guard	Former NBA player.
Brent Barry	1995–2009	Guard	Son of Rick Barry. He is a former NBA player, who won the NBA championship twice in 2005 and 2007. He also became the NBA Slam Dunk Contest champion in 1996. Being a student, Brent Barry visited Lithuania and played a few exhibition games in the Kaunas Sports Hall.
Drew Barry	1996–2003	Shooting guard	Former NBA player.
Andy Rautins	2010–2020	Shooting guard	NBA D-League Showcase Three-Point Shootout champion in 2013, former NBA player.
Tim Abromaitis	2012–present	Power forward	Former NCAA star. Abromaitis tore his cruciate ligaments in the university and was never drafted to the NBA due that, but played in the EuroLeague. His Lithuanian great-grandparents emigrated to the United States and his family still follows the Lithuanian traditions. Abromaitis wished to gain a Lithuanian passport, however he did not receive it because his relatives emigrated in 1915 when Lithuania was still part of the Russian Empire and they never returned to Lithuania after its independence declaration in 1918. He does not speak the Lithuanian language, but was impressed by The Other Dream Team movie and was very interested in his Lithuanian heritage during his first visit to Kaunas in 2013.
Nik Stauskas	2014–2022	Shooting guard	Former NBA player, selected eighth overall by the Sacramento Kings in the 2014 NBA draft. Has three Lithuanian grandparents, two of which emigrated to Canada. Stauskas attended the Lithuanian school in Toronto and he is able to understand the Lithuanian language as his Lithuanian grandparents only communicate with him in that. After joining the NCAA in 2013, Stauskas stated that would consider the possibility to represent Lithuania, but went on to play for his birth country, Canada.
Drew Crawford	2014–present	Shooting guard Small Forward	Crawford's mother is Lithuanian American. He was named as the Italian league MVP in 2019.
Kyle Dranginis	2016–present	Shooting Guard	Played in NCAA, Germany and Denmark.
Canyon Barry	2017–present	Shooting guard	SEC Sixth Man of The Year (2017), Academic All-American of The Year (2017).
Terry Tarpey	2016–present	Small Forward	In a 2022 interview Tarpey revealed that his grandfather is Lithuanian. Terry plays for the France national team.

=== Basketball people of Lithuanian descent (list not including players) ===
Name	Description
Mark Cuban	Mark Cuban is an American investor and entrepreneur. He owns the Dallas Mavericks of the NBA. In an interview he said that his grandmother was Lithuanian and lived in Darbėnai.

== Lithuanians in the NBA and the WNBA ==
Male players at the NBA

Player	Pos.	Team(s) played	Career^{[a]}	Games played		NBA draft		Notes	Ref
Player	Pos.	Team(s) played	Career^{[a]}	Regular season	Playoffs	Year (pick)	Team	Notes	Ref
Martynas Andriuškevičius	C	Cleveland Cavaliers	2005–2006	6	0	2005 (44th)	Orlando Magic	Born in the Soviet Union, represented Lithuania internationally.	
Ignas Brazdeikis	SF	New York Knicks, Philadelphia 76ers, Orlando Magic	2019–2021 2021 2021–present	64	0	2019 (47th)	Sacramento Kings		
Žydrūnas Ilgauskas	C	Cleveland Cavaliers, Miami Heat	1996–2010 2010–2011	843	80	1996 (20th)	Cleveland Cavaliers	Born in the Soviet Union, represented Lithuania internationally.	
Šarūnas Jasikevičius	PG	Indiana Pacers, Golden State Warriors	2005–2007 2007	138	10	1998	Undrafted	Born in the Soviet Union, represented Lithuania internationally.	
Linas Kleiza	SF/PF	Denver Nuggets, Toronto Raptors	2005–2009 2010–2013	409	26	2005 (27th)	Portland Trail Blazers	Born in the Soviet Union, represented Lithuania internationally.	
Arnoldas Kulboka	SF/PF	Charlotte Hornets	2021–present	2		2018 (55th)	Charlotte Hornets		
Mindaugas Kuzminskas	SF/PF	New York Knicks	2016–2017	69	0	2011	Undrafted	Born in the Soviet Union, represented Lithuania internationally.	
Arvydas Macijauskas	SG	New Orleans/Oklahoma City Hornets	2005–2006	19	0	2002	Undrafted	Born in the Soviet Union, represented Lithuania internationally.	
Šarūnas Marčiulionis	SG/SF	Golden State Warriors, Seattle SuperSonics, Sacramento Kings, Denver Nuggets	1989–1994 1994–1995 1995–19961996–1997	363	17	1987 (127th)	Golden State Warriors	Born in the Soviet Union, represented the Soviet Union and Lithuania internationally.	
Donatas Motiejūnas	PF/C	Houston Rockets, New Orleans Pelicans, San Antonio Spurs	2012–2016 2017 2019	251	11	2011 (20th)	Minnesota Timberwolves		
Arvydas Sabonis	C	Portland Trail Blazers	1995–2001 2002–2003	470	51	1986 (24th)	Portland Trail Blazers	Born in the Soviet Union, represented the Soviet Union and Lithuania internationally.	
Domantas Sabonis	PF/C	Oklahoma City Thunder, Indiana Pacers, Sacramento Kings	2016–20172017–2022 2022–present	415	13	2016 (11th)	Orlando Magic	Born in the United States to Lithuanian parents, represents Lithuania internationally.	
Deividas Sirvydis	SF / SG	Detroit Pistons	2020–2022	23	0	2019 (37th)	Dallas Mavericks		
Darius Songaila	PF/C	Sacramento Kings, Chicago Bulls, Washington Wizards, New Orleans Hornets, Philadelphia 76ers	2003–2005 2005–2006 2006–2009 2009–2010 2010–2011	495	21	2002 (50th)	Boston Celtics	Born in the Soviet Union, represented Lithuania internationally.	
Jonas Valančiūnas	C	Toronto Raptors, Memphis Grizzlies, New Orleans Pelicans	2012–2019 2019–2021 2021–present	695	54	2011 (5th)	Toronto Raptors		
Matas Buzelis	F	Chicago Bulls	2024–present	0	0	2024 (11th)	Chicago Bulls	Born in Chicago, Illinois, United States, but both of his parents are Lithuanians. In 2022, he was registered as Lithuanian in FIBA system.	
Kasparas Jakučionis	PG / SG	Miami Heat	2025–present	0	0	2025 (20th)	Miami Heat	Before being drafted to the NBA, he won the 2022 FIBA U16 European Championship when representing the Lithuania's U-16 national team.	

Drafted, but never played at the NBA

Player	Pos	NBA draft		Notes	Ref
Player	Pos	Year (pick)	Team	Notes	Ref
Artūras Gudaitis	C	2015 (47th)	Philadelphia 76ers		
Robertas Javtokas	C	2001 (55th)	San Antonio Spurs	Born in the Soviet Union, represented Lithuania internationally.	
Rokas Jokubaitis	PG	2021 (34th)	Oklahoma City Thunder		
Renaldas Seibutis	SG	2007 (50th)	Dallas Mavericks	Born in the Soviet Union, represented Lithuania internationally.	
Eurelijus Žukauskas	C	1995 (54th)	Seattle SuperSonics	Born in the Soviet Union, represented Lithuania internationally.	

Female players at the WNBA

#	Player	Club	Games	Points	Seasons
1	Aneta Kaušaitė	Detroit Shock	10	14	1
2	Jurgita Štreimikytė	Indiana Fever	92	571	3
2	Laura Juškaitė	Toronto Tempo	Active	Active	1
4	Justė Jocytė	Golden State Valkyries	Active	Active	1

== Sources ==
- Bertašius, Algimantas; Stonkus, Stanislovas (2009). Su Lietuvos vardu per Europą, per pasaulį: Lietuvos krepšinio rinktinių kelias (1925-2008 m.) (in Lithuanian). Kaunas: Arx Baltica, Lietuvos krepšinio federacija. ISBN 978-9955-39-075-6.
- Stonkus, Stanislovas (2007). Lietuvos krepšinis. Pažinkime Lietuvą (in Lithuanian). Kaunas: Šviesa. ISBN 978-5-430-04703-0.
