= Andrius Jurkūnas =

Lithuanian basketball player (born 1976)

Nevėžis-Paskolų klubas
- Title: Assistant coach
- League: Lithuanian Basketball League

Personal information
- Born: 21 May 1976 (age 50) Kaunas, Lithuanian SSR, Soviet Union
- Listed height: 6 ft 9 in (2.06 m)
- Listed weight: 234 lb (106 kg)

Career information
- College: Clemson (1995–2000)
- NBA draft: 2000: undrafted
- Playing career: 2000–2013
- Position: Power forward
- Coaching career: 2013–present

Career history

Playing
- 2000–2001: Žalgiris Kaunas
- 2002: Polonia Warsaw
- 2002–2003: Hapoel Jerusalem
- 2003–2004: Astoria Bydgoszcz
- 2004: Ironi Ashkelon
- 2005: Dornbirn Lions
- 2005–2009: Szolnoki Olaj
- 2011–2013: Savanoris Alytus
- 2013: TiuMenas-Ežerūnas Molėtai

Coaching
- 2013–?: Szolnoki Olaj (assistant)
- 2021–2025: Nevėžis–OPTIBET (assistant)
- 2025-2026: BC Alytus
- 2026-present: Nevėžis-Paskolų klubas (assistant)
Medals
Men's basketball
Representing Lithuania
FIBA Europe Under-18 Championship
| Gold medal – first place | 1994 Israel | U-18 Team |
FIBA Europe Under-20 Championship
| Gold medal – first place | 1996 Turkey | U-20 Team |

Andrius Jurkūnas (born 21 May 1976) is a Lithuanian professional basketball coach and former player.

== Playing career ==
Jurkūnas played for Clemson University, which he attended from 1995 to 2000.

He then moved to Žalgiris Kaunas, where he played 1.5 seasons. In 2002, he moved to Polonia Warsaw. After the 2001–2002 season, he signed the contract with Alba Berlin; however, he was released immediately after the health examination. Then he played for Hapoel Jerusalem, Astoria Bydgoszcz and Ironi Ashkelon. In 2004, he signed with Dornbirn Lions. From 2005 to 2009, he played for Szolnoki Olaj. Jurkūnas finished his career by playing for Savanoris Alytus and TiuMenas-Ežerūnas Molėtai.

== Coaching career ==
After finishing his playing career, Jurkūnas joined Szolnoki Olaj coaching staff.

== Honours ==
Clubs

- Lithuanian champion – 2001
- Hungarian champion – 2007

International

- FIBA Europe Under-18 Championship gold medal – 1994
- FIBA Europe Under-20 Championship golde medal – 1996

== Career statistics ==
Legend
| GP | Games played | GS | Games started | MPG | Minutes per game |
| FG% | Field-goal percentage | 3P% | 3-point field-goal percentage | FT% | Free-throw percentage |
| RPG | Rebounds per game | APG | Assists per game | SPG | Steals per game |
| BPG | Blocks per game | PPG | Points per game | PIR | Performance index rating |
| **Bold** | Career high |

=== Euroleague ===
| Year | Team | GP | GS | MPG | FG% | 3P% | FT% | RPG | APG | SPG | BPG | PPG | PIR |
|---|---|---|---|---|---|---|---|---|---|---|---|---|---|
| 2000–01 | Žalgiris | **12** | **9** | **26.2** | .556 | .414 | **.657** | **3.7** | **1.1** | **1.3** | **.9** | **12.1** | **10.4** |
| 2001–02 | Žalgiris | 5 | 0 | 21.4 | **.1000** | **.571** | .250 | 1.8 | .8 | .4 | .6 | 6.6 | 3.6 |
