= Robert Browning (disambiguation) =

Robert Browning (1812–1889) was an English poet and playwright.

Robert Browning may also refer to:

- Robert Browning (Byzantinist) (1914–1997), Scottish professor of Byzantine studies
- Robert Barrett Browning (1849–1912), English painter
- Robert X. Browning (21st century), American archivist
- Bob Browning (1888–1949), English footballer with Queens Park Rangers and Southampton
- Robert Browning School, Canada
- Robert Browning, hanged for the 1874 murder of Emma Rolfe

== See also ==
- Robert Brunning (1943–2011), British musician
- Christopher Robert Browning (born 1944), American historian of the Holocaust
