= Justin Herdman-Reed =

Canadian gridiron football player (born 1994)

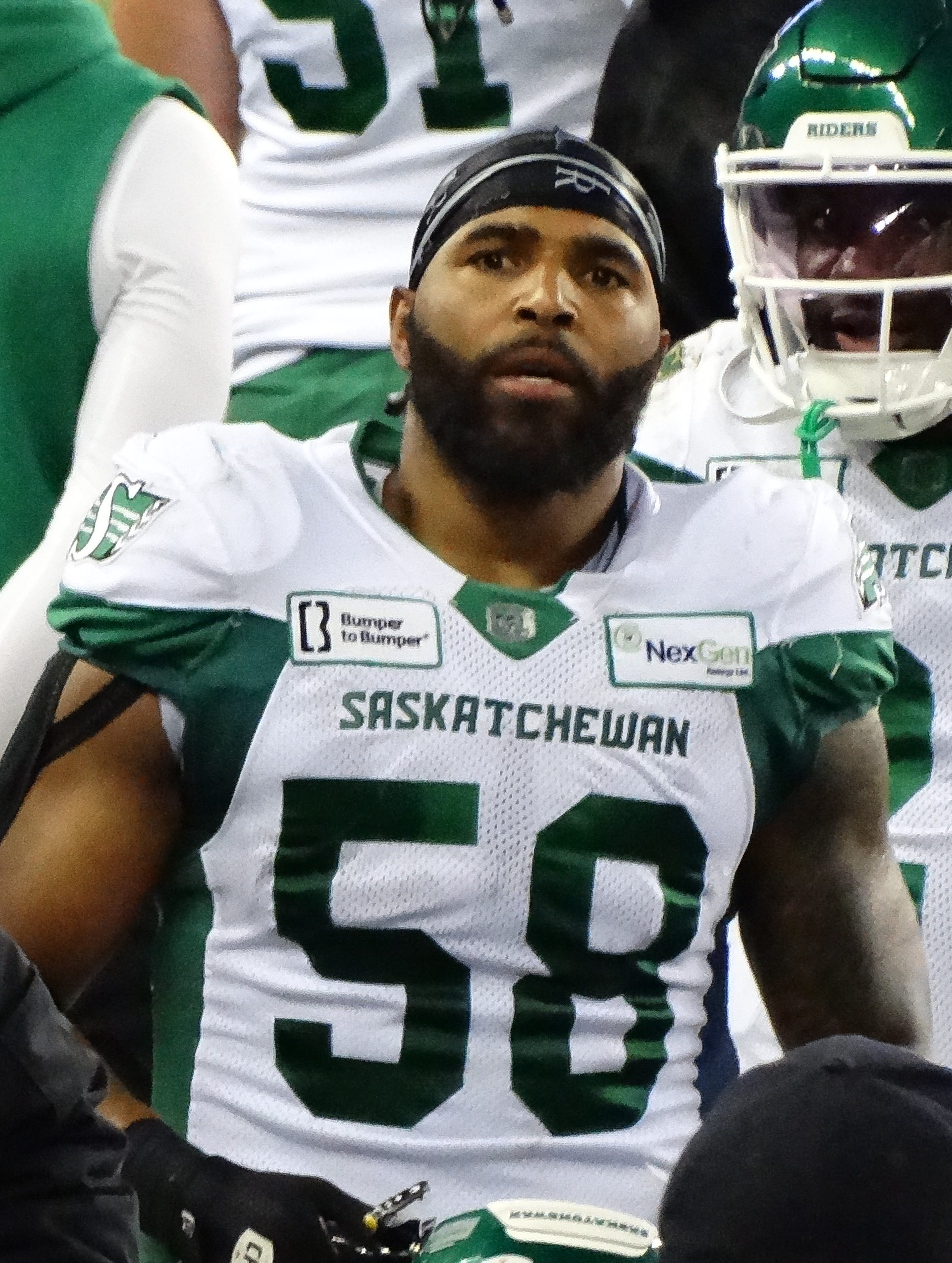
- Herdman-Reed with the Saskatchewan Roughriders in 2024

No. 59 – Saskatchewan Roughriders
- Position: Linebacker
- Roster status: Active
- CFL status: National

Personal information
- Born: July 21, 1994 (age 32); Winnipeg, Manitoba, Canada
- Listed height: 5 ft 11 in (1.80 m)
- Listed weight: 225 lb (102 kg)

Career information
- High school: Sturgeon Heights
- College: Simon Fraser
- CFL draft: 2017: 7th round, 54th overall pick

Career history
- 2017–2019: Toronto Argonauts
- 2020: Hamilton Tiger-Cats*
- 2021–2024: Saskatchewan Roughriders
- 2025: Calgary Stampeders
- 2026–present: Saskatchewan Roughriders*
- * Offseason or practice squad member only
- Stats at CFL.ca

Justin Herdman-Reed (born July 21, 1994) is a Canadian professional football linebacker for the Saskatchewan Roughriders of the Canadian Football League (CFL). His twin brother Jordan Herdman-Reed also plays in the CFL.

== University career ==
Herdman-Reed played college football with the Simon Fraser Clan. He played in 31 games where he recorded 213 tackles, including 32 tackles for a loss, six sacks, two interceptions, five forced fumbles, and six fumble recoveries.

== Professional career ==
Pre-draft measurables
Height	Weight	40-yard dash	20-yard shuttle	Three-cone drill	Vertical jump	Broad jump	Bench press
5 ft 10 5/8 in (1.79 m)	223 lb (101 kg)	5.13 s	4.47 s	7.52 s	30.5 in (0.77 m)	9 ft 0 in (2.74 m)	12 reps
All values from CFL Combine

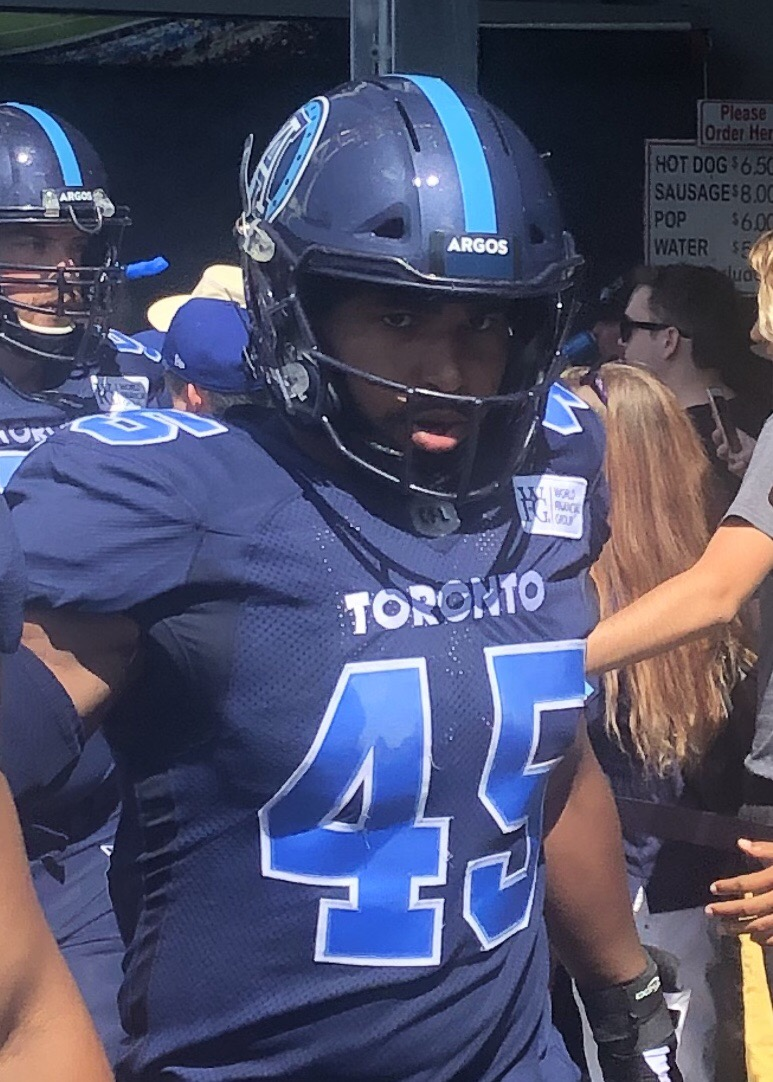
Herdman-Reed with the Toronto Argonauts in 2019.

=== Toronto Argonauts ===
Herdman-Reed was drafted 54th overall in the 2017 CFL draft by the Toronto Argonauts and signed with the team on May 15, 2017. He played in his first professional regular season game on July 29, 2017, against the Saskatchewan Roughriders where he had one special teams tackle. He played in 11 regular season games in 2017 where he had three defensive tackles and two special teams tackles. He finished the year on the injured list as the Argonauts won the 105th Grey Cup, bringing Herdman-Reed his first Grey Cup championship.

He played in all 18 regular season games in 2018 where he featured predominantly on special teams, recording 19 special teams tackles and three defensive tackles. For the 2019 season, Herdman-Reed had a career year as he had 37 defensive tackles, five special teams tackles, two sacks, and two forced fumbles in just 11 regular season games. He had his first two career sacks in the Labour Day Classic on September 2, 2019, against the Hamilton Tiger-Cats. In the following week's game against the Redblacks, Herdman-Reed suffered a separated shoulder injury and was out for the rest of the year.

=== Hamilton Tiger-Cats ===
Herdman-Reed signed with the Hamilton Tiger-Cats as a free agent to a one-year contract on February 11, 2020. However, the 2020 CFL season was cancelled and he never played in a game for the team as his contract expired in 2021.

=== Saskatchewan Roughriders ===
On the first day of free agency in 2021, Herdman-Reed signed with the Saskatchewan Roughriders on February 9, 2021.

On February 13, 2024, the Roughriders announced that they had extended the contract of Herdman-Reed. He played in 16 regular season games in 2024 where he had 16 special teams tackles. He was with the team in training camp in 2025, but was part of the final cuts on May 31, 2025.

=== Calgary Stampeders ===
On July 14, 2025, it was announced that Herdman-Reed had signed a practice roster agreement with the Calgary Stampeders. He played in nine regular season games where he had one defensive tackle and three special teams tackles. He became a free agent upon the expiry of his contract on February 10, 2026.

=== Saskatchewan Roughriders (second stint) ===
On September 20, 2026, Herdman-Reed signed with the Saskatchewan Roughriders practice roster.

== Personal life ==
Herdman-Reed's twin brother, Jordan Herdman-Reed, who is two minutes older, also plays professionally as a linebacker. Their father, James Reed, was also a professional linebacker who played for the Philadelphia Eagles, Winnipeg Blue Bombers, Montreal Concordes, New Orleans Breakers, Washington Federals, Saskatchewan Roughriders, and Toronto Argonauts.
