= Žydrūnas Urbonas =

Lithuanian basketball player and coach

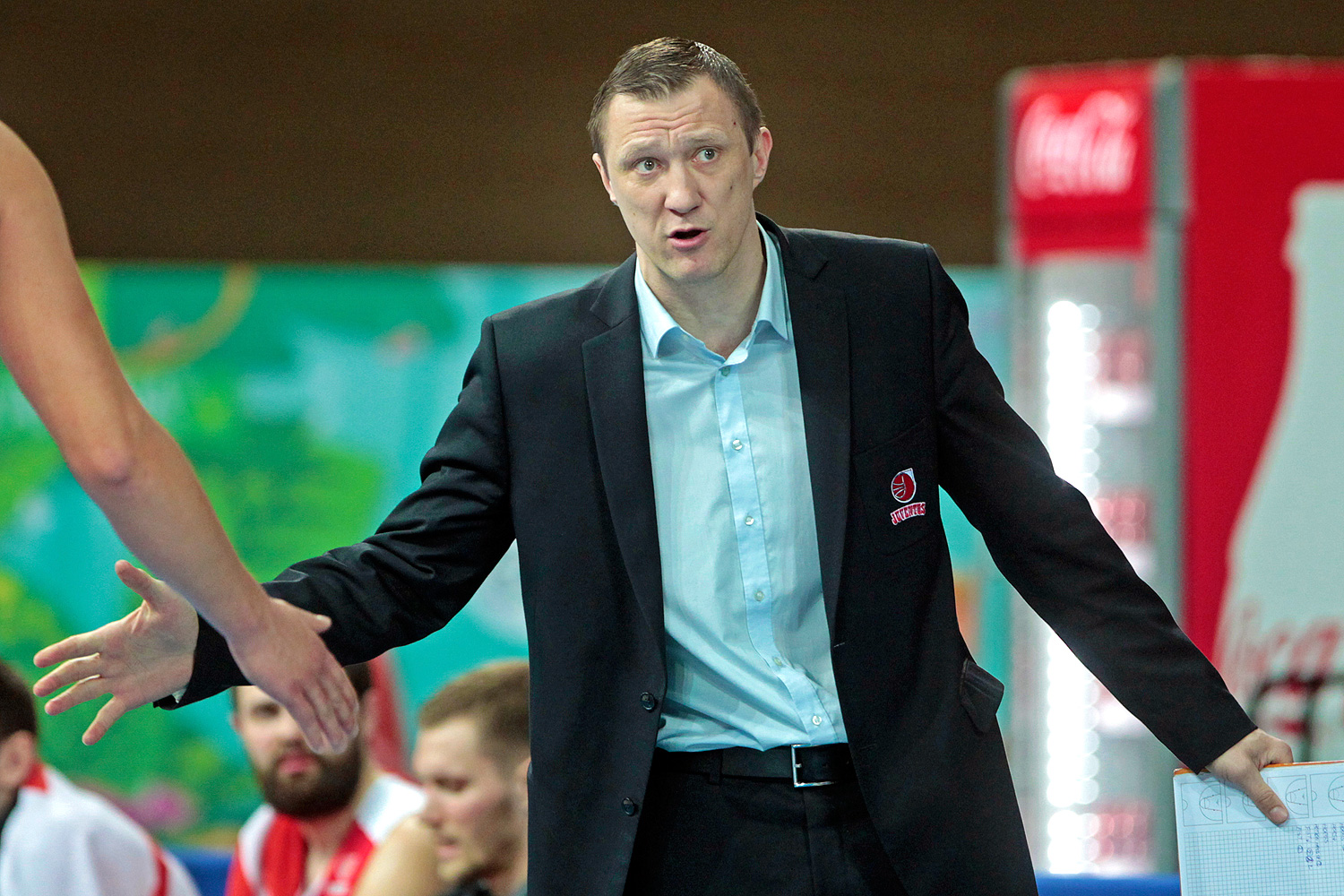
- Urbonas with Juventus Utena in 2015

CS Dinamo București
- Title: Head coach
- League: Liga Națională

Personal information
- Born: 4 October 1976 (age 50) Zarasai, Lithuanian SSR, Soviet Union
- Listed height: 6 ft 6.7 in (2.00 m)
- Listed weight: 220 lb (100 kg)

Career information
- NBA draft: 1998: undrafted
- Playing career: 1993–2012
- Position: Small forward / power forward
- Coaching career: 2012–present

Career history

Playing
- 1993–1994: Lietkabelis Panevėžys
- 1994–1995: Lavera Kaunas
- 1995–1998: Lietkabelis/Kalnapilis Panevėžys
- 1998–1999: Šilutė
- 1999–2001: Šiauliai
- 2001–2002: Metallurg Magnitogorsk
- 2002–2003: Šiauliai
- 2003: AGE Chalkida
- 2003–2005: Šiauliai
- 2005–2006: Barons Riga
- 2006–2007: AEL Limassol
- 2007–2008: Techasas Panevėžys
- 2008: Alytus
- 2008–2009: Donetsk
- 2009–2012: Juventus Utena

Coaching
- 2012–2017: Juventus Utena (assistant)
- 2017–2022: Juventus Utena
- 2023: Sigal Prishtina
- 2023–2025: Šiauliai
- 2025–present: Dinamo București

Career highlights
- LKL Most Valuable Player (2001); 2× LKL All-Star (2001, 2003); No. 8 retired by Juventus Utena
Medals
Men's basketball
Representing Lithuania
FIBA Europe Under-18 Championship
Gold medal – first place	1994 Israel	U-18 Team

Žydrūnas Urbonas (born 4 October 1976 in Zarasai, Lithuanian Soviet Socialist Republic, USSR) is a professional basketball coach and former player who is the current head coach for Dinamo București of the Liga Națională.

== Playing career ==
Urbonas made his professional debut in the 1993–94 season and continued to play for various teams in the Lithuanian Basketball League for another eight years, playing for BC Lietkabelis, BC Lavera, being one of the team leaders there, before signing with BC Šiauliai, where he reached his biggest success, helping the team finish in 3rd place in 2000 and 2001, and becoming the LKL MVP in the 2001 season. In 2001, he moved to Metallurg Magnitogorsk of the Russian Basketball Super League 1, however, after the season he returned to BC Šiauliai and spent the 2002–03 season there before signing with AGE Chalkida of the Greek A2 Basket League for a brief time in 2003, though he returned to BC Šiauliai again to finish the 2003-2004 season and played a full 2004–05 season. He helped the team to win 3rd place in the LKL in 2004, and helped them win the LKL, BBL and FIBA Euro Cup Conference North 3rd places. In the 2005–06 season Urbonas signed with Barons Riga of the Latvian Basketball League and then moved to AEL Limassol of the Cyprus Basketball Division A for the 2006–07 season. Urbonas returned to Lithuania in 2007 and played there until autumn 2008 before signing with Donetsk of the Ukrainian Basketball SuperLeague for the 2008–2009 season. He finished his career playing for Juventus Utena from 2009 to 2012.

== Coaching career ==
In 2009, Urbonas became a player-coach and the team's president when he joined Juventus Utena, and then became the assistant coach when he retired in 2012. He served as head coach under Rytis Vaišvila, Vitoldas Masalskis, Virginijus Sirvydis and Antanas Sireika, who coached and mentored him back during his playing days in BC Šiauliai. He was still assistant coach, this time under Gediminas Petrauskas, in the 2017-2018 season, but became head coach by October, after Petrauskas resigned due to poor results.

== National team career ==
Urbonas won a gold medal with the Lithuanian under-18 national team in 1994 FIBA Europe Under-18 Championship.

== Career statistics ==
Legend
GP	Games played	GS	Games started	MPG	Minutes per game
FG%	Field goal percentage	3P%	3-point field goal percentage	FT%	Free throw percentage
RPG	Rebounds per game	APG	Assists per game	SPG	Steals per game
BPG	Blocks per game	PPG	Points per game	**Bold**	Career high

Year	Team	GP	GS	MPG	FG%	3P%	FT%	RPG	APG	SPG	BPG	PPG
2008–09	Donetsk	10		21.37	.35	.25	.7	4.5	1.00	0.7	**.0**	7.2
