= Westwood Collegiate =

Location
- 360 Rouge Road; Winnipeg, Manitoba, R3K 1K3; Canada; 49.8758°N 97.3006°W

Information
- School type: Public high school
- Motto: Nulli Secundus (Second to None)
- Founded: 1960
- School board: St. James-Assiniboia School Division
- Superintendent: Jenness Moffatt
- Principal: Tammy Baydock
- Grades: 9 - 12
- Language: English
- Area: St. James-Assiniboia
- Team name: Warriors
- Website: www.sjasd.ca/school/westwood/

Westwood Collegiate is a high school in Winnipeg, Manitoba. The school teaches grades 9 to 12. Located at 360 Rouge Road, the school is part of the St. James-Assiniboia School Division. In addition to the Provincial Graduation Diploma, Westwood offers the Advanced Placement (AP) program, which consists of university level courses.

The school's mission statement is "to empower all students and staff for the choices and challenges of the 21st century while working and learning in a safe and supportive environment."

The school day runs from 8:30 am until 3:30 pm, with some optional courses starting at 7:20 am.

Until the 2023-24 School year, Westwood offered IB Diplomas through the International Baccalaureate Program. In 2020, it was announced that the IB program would be suspended at both Sturgeon Heights and Westwood in favor of the AP program, with the last IB students graduating in 2024.

== Notable alumni ==
- Dustin Boyd, professional ice hockey player
- Wendy Crewson, actress (The Santa Clause)
- Tanyalee Davis, stand-up comedian
- Doug Eyolfson, Politician, current MP for Winnipeg West
- Chris Jericho, professional wrestler (WWE), musician (Fozzy), and TV personality
- Greg MacPherson, singer/songwriter
- Nolan Patrick, professional ice hockey player for the Vegas Golden Knights
- Mark Stone, professional ice hockey player for the Vegas Golden Knights
- Michael Stone (ice hockey), professional ice hockey player for the Calgary Flames
- Joey Vickery, professional basketball player
- Doug Wilson, professional ice hockey defenceman and executive
