= James Reed (linebacker) =

American football player (born 1955)

No. 57
- Position: Linebacker

Personal information
- Born: October 10, 1955 (age 71); Corpus Christi, Texas, U.S.
- Listed height: 6 ft 2 in (1.88 m)
- Listed weight: 230 lb (104 kg)

Career information
- High school: Woodrow Wilson (San Francisco, California)
- College: San Jose CC (1973–1974); California (1975–1976)
- NFL draft: 1977: undrafted

Career history
- Philadelphia Eagles (1977); Winnipeg Blue Bombers (1979–1983); Montreal Concordes (1983); New Orleans Breakers (1984); Saskatchewan Roughriders (1985); Toronto Argonauts (1985)

Career NFL statistics
- Games played: 4
- Stats at Pro Football Reference

James Curtis Reed (born October 10, 1955) is an American former professional football player who was a linebacker for the Philadelphia Eagles of the National Football League (NFL). He played college football for the California Golden Bears.

== Personal life ==
Reed is the father of Canadian Football League players Jordan Herdman-Reed and Justin Herdman-Reed.
