= Evaldas Jocys =

Lithuanian basketball player

Personal information
- Born: 25 May 1975 (age 51) Plungė, Lithuanian SSR, Soviet Union
- Listed height: 6 ft 9 in (2.06 m)
- Listed weight: 230 lb (104 kg)

Career information
- College: Western Nebraska CC (1996–1998); East Carolina (1998–2000)
- NBA draft: 2000: undrafted
- Playing career: 1993–2013
- Position: Power forward

Career history
- 1993–1997: Olimpas Plungė
- 2000–2001: Hapoel Galil Elyon
- 2001–2002: Bayer 04 Leverkusen
- 2002–2003: Brandt Hagen
- 2003–2005: Dexia Mons-Hainaut
- 2005–2006: Eisbären Bremerhaven
- 2008–2011: BC Naglis-Adakris
- 2011–2013: Olimpas Plungė

Evaldas Jocys (born 25 May 1975 in Plungė, Lithuanian SSR) is a former Lithuanian professional basketball player. He last played for his hometown team Olimpas Plungė.

== College career ==
Jocys played in the NCAA Division I's East Carolina Pirates for two seasons. In his sophomore year, he led the team with 13.8 points, 6.2 rebounds and 2.1 assists per game. He also played for Western Nebraska Community College and earned NJCAA 1st Team All-American award in 1998.

== Professional career ==
Jocys started his professional career in 1993 with Olimpas Plungė. He left the team four years later and studied in America for a couple of years before returning to Europe. He played for various teams in Israel, Germany and Belgium, most notably for Hapoel Galil Elyon participating in Saporta Cup. He averaged 4.8 assists per game despite being a 2.03 m (6 ft 8 in) big man in that tournament.

== Youth team ==
Jocys won a gold medal in the 1996 FIBA Europe Under-22 Championship while representing Lithuania. He also participated in the 1997 FIBA Under-21 World Championship, finishing in 8th place.

== Personal life ==
Jocys's niece is Justė Jocytė, a Lithuanian women's basketball phenom. His brother played college basketball in the United States.
