= 2008 Telus Cup =

Tournament details
- Venue(s): Nick Smith Centre in Arnprior, ON
- Dates: April 21–27, 2008
- Teams: 6

Final positions
- Champions: Sudbury Nickel Capital Wolves
- Runners-up: Winnipeg Thrashers
- Third place: Blizzard de Sèminiaire Saint-François

Tournament statistics
- Scoring leader: Mark Stone

Awards
- MVP: Mathew Bodie

The 2008 Telus Cup was Canada's 30th annual national midget 'AAA' hockey championship, played April 21–27, 2008 at Arnprior, Ontario. The Sudbury Nickel Capital Wolves defeated the Winnipeg Thrashers 6-4 in the gold medal game to win their first national title. The Blizzard de Sèminiaire Saint-François from Quebec picked up their second consecutive bronze medal. Current Vegas Golden Knights forward Mark Stone, playing for the Thrashers, was the tournament's top scorer.

== Teams ==
Result	Team	Region	City
1st place, gold medalist(s)	Sudbury Nickel Capital Wolves	Central	Sudbury, ON
2nd place, silver medalist(s)	Winnipeg Thrashers	West	Winnipeg, MB
3rd place, bronze medalist(s)	Blizzard de Sèminiaire Saint-François	Québec	Québec City, QC
4	Calgary Buffaloes	Pacific	Calgary, AB
5	Cole Harbour McCains	Atlantic	Cole Harbour, NS
6	Ottawa Valley Titans	Host	Arnprior, ON

== Round robin ==
=== Standings ===
Pos	Team	Pld	W	L	D	GF	GA	GD	Pts
1	Winnipeg Thrashers	5	5	0	0	23	12	+11	10
2	Sudbury Nickel Capital Wolves	5	3	1	1	18	13	+5	7
3	Calgary Buffaloes	5	2	2	1	11	10	+1	5
4	Blizzard de Sèminiaire Saint-François	5	2	3	0	16	11	+5	4
5	Cole Harbour McCains	5	1	3	1	9	14	−5	3
6	Ottawa Valley Titans	5	0	4	1	10	27	−17	1

=== Scores ===
- Saint-François 3 - Cole Harbour 1
- Winnipeg 3 - Calgary 0
- Sudbury 6 - Ottawa Valley 4
- Winnipeg 5 - Saint-François 2
- Calgary 2 - Sudbury 2
- Cole Harbour 1 - Ottawa Valley 1
- Sudbury 3 - Saint-François 2
- Winnipeg 4 - Cole Harbour 3
- Calgary 5 - Ottawa Valley 1
- Sudbury 3 - Cole Harbour 0
- Calgary 1 - Saint-François 0
- Winnipeg 6 - Ottawa Valley 3
- Cole Harbour 4 - Calgary 3
- Winnipeg 5 - Sudbury 4
- Saint-François 9 - Ottawa Valley 1

== Playoffs ==
=== Semi-finals ===
- Winnipeg 4 - Saint-François 1
- Sudbury 5 - Calgary 2

=== Bronze-medal game ===
- Saint-François 7 - Calgary 2

=== Gold-medal game ===
- Sudbury 6 - Winnipeg 4

== Individual awards ==
- Most Valuable Player: Mathew Bodie (Winnipeg)
- Top Scorer: Mark Stone (Winnipeg)
- Top Forward: Mattieu Lecours (Sudbury)
- Top Defenceman: Mathew Bodie (Winnipeg)
- Top Goaltender: Kris Moore (Calgary
- Most Sportsmanlike Player: Jordan Burke (Cole Harbour)

== See also ==
- Telus Cup
