= BC Savanoris =

BC Alytus
- Founded: 2011
- Dissolved: 2012
- Arena: Alytus Arena (capacity: 5500)
- Location: Alytus, Lithuania
- Team colors: White and Black
- Website: bcalytus.lt
Home	Away

BC Savanoris (Lithuanian: Krepšinio Klubas Savanoris) is basketball club of Alytus, Lithuania. It was founded in 2011 and replaced BC Alytus in national pyramid of basketball. Because of shortage of direct links with BC Alytus, club started competing in the third tier of Lithuanian basketball, called RKL. Despite the declared aim of getting promotion to second tier, NKL, BC Savanoris lost to BC Olimpas in round of eight-final. The remnants of the team became the basis of future LKL team BC Dzūkija.

== Achievements ==
Year	League	Season	Play-Off	Baltic	Events	European	Events
2011–12	RKL	14	1/8	-	-	–	–
