= Tim Brooks (basketball) =

American basketball player (born 1971)

Personal information
- Born: March 19, 1971 (age 55) Louisville, Kentucky, U.S.
- Listed height: 6 ft 0 in (1.83 m)
- Listed weight: 170 lb (77 kg)

Career information
- High school: Valley (Louisville, Kentucky)
- College: Sullivan College (1989–1991); Chattanooga (1991–1993)
- NBA draft: 1993: undrafted
- Position: Point guard

Career history
- 1994–1996: Olimpas Plunge
- 1996–1997: COB Saint-Brieuc CA
- 1997–1998: Olimpas Plunge

Career highlights
- Lithuanian League MVP (1996); SoCon Player of the Year (1993); 2× First Team All-SoCon (1991, 1992); SoCon tournament MVP (1993)

Timothy Louis Brooks (born March 19, 1971) is an American former professional basketball player, who played for Olimpas Plungė in Lithuania. He is better known, however, for his collegiate career at the University of Tennessee at Chattanooga.

== College career ==
After two years of playing junior college basketball, Brooks transferred to Chattanooga in the fall of 1991, to spend his final two years of National Collegiate Athletic Association (NCAA) eligibility, to play for the Mocs. Brooks established himself as one of the best players to ever suit up for the program. As of 2013, and in only two seasons of competition, he is still tied for second for the most assists (414) in a career, while he holds the top single season records for assists (209) and steals (83) in a season. He was a two-time First Team All-Southern Conference (SoCon) selection, and as a senior, he was the SoCon tournament MVP. Brooks led the Mocs to their first NCAA tournament in five years, when they earned a berth in 1993. In addition, he was named the SoCon Player of the Year in 1992–93.

== Professional career ==
The National Basketball Association (NBA) invited Brooks to their NBA draft Camp, after his collegiate career ended. However, Brooks never made an NBA roster. He several seasons professionally in Lithuania and spent the 1996–97 season with COB Saint-Brieuc CA in the French LNB Pro B.

== Personal ==
As of February 2008, Brooks lived in Nashville, Tennessee, and worked for FedEx, as an operations supervisor.
