= St. James-Assiniboia School Division =

School district in Manitoba, Canada

Coordinates: 49.882°N 97.242°W

Location
- 2574 Portage Ave, Winnipeg, MB

District information
- Established: 1959
- Superintendent: Jenness Moffatt
- Chair of the board: Tara Smith
- Schools: 26
- Budget: $140m CAD (2025/26)

Students and staff
- Students: 8,500

Other information
- Website: sjasd.ca/

St. James-Assiniboia School Division (SJASD) is a school division in the St. James-Assiniboia area of Winnipeg, Manitoba.

== Schools ==
There are 26 schools in the division: 15 elementary, six middle, and four high schools. Six of these schools offer French immersion. Most of its schools are in Winnipeg, however one is located in Headingley and another in Brooklands.

=== Elementary ===
- Athlone School
- Brooklands School
- Buchanan School
- Crestview School
- École Assiniboine
- École Bannatyne
- École Robert Browning
- École Voyageur
- Heritage School
- Lakewood School
- Linwood School
- Phoenix School
- Sansome School
- Stevenson-Britannia School
- Strathmillan School

=== Middle schools ===
- Bruce Middle School
- École Ness
- George Waters Middle School
- Golden Gate Middle School
- Hedges Middle School
- Lincoln Middle School

=== High schools ===
- Collège Sturgeon Heights Collegiate
- Jameswood Alternative School
- John Taylor Collegiate
- St. James Collegiate
- Westwood Collegiate

== See also ==
List of school districts in Manitoba
