= Valdemaras Chomičius =

Lithuanian basketball player

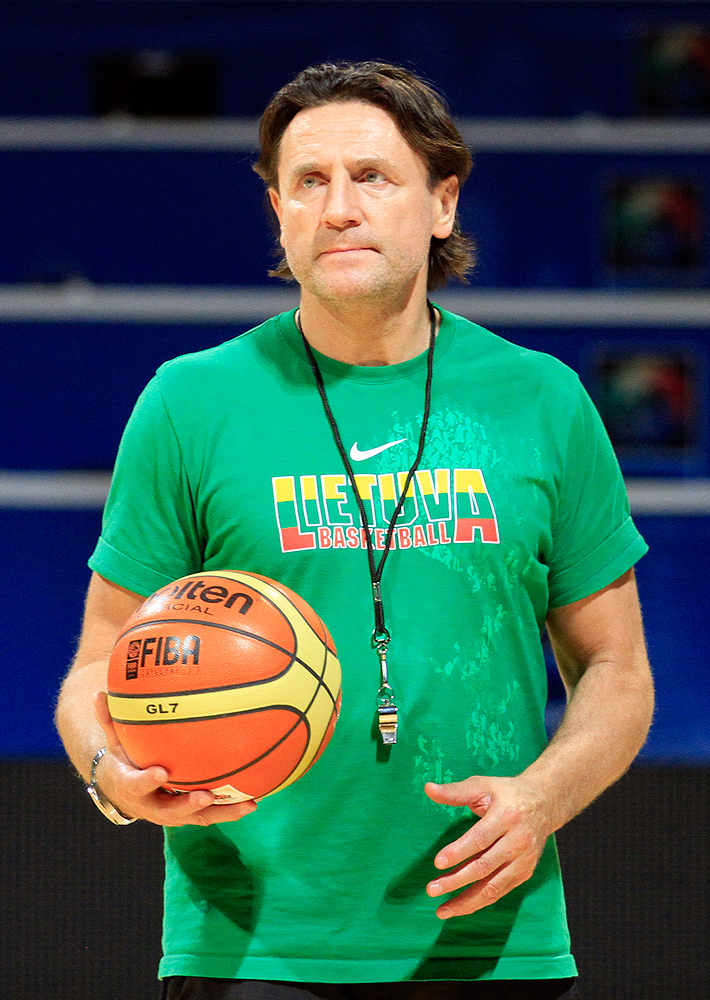
- Chomičius in 2011

Personal information
- Born: 4 May 1959 (age 67) Kaunas, Lithuanian SSR, Soviet Union
- Listed height: 1.93 m (6 ft 4 in)
- Listed weight: 98 kg (216 lb)

Career information
- Playing career: 1978–1999
- Position: Point guard / shooting guard
- Coaching career: 1996–present

Career history

Playing
- 1978–1989: Žalgiris Kaunas
- 1989–1990: Forum Valladolid
- 1990–1991: Aprimatic Bologna
- 1991–1992: CAI Zaragoza
- 1992: Castors Braine
- 1992–1993: Charleroi
- 1993–1994: Castors Braine
- 1994–1995: Marbella
- 1995: Torremolinos
- 1995–1996: Mažeikiai
- 1996–1997: Olimpas Žemaitija
- 1998–1999: Kraitenė Marijampolė

Coaching
- 1996–1998: Olimpas Žemaitija
- 1998–1999: Kraitenė Marijampolė
- 1999–2002: Ural Great Perm (assistant)
- 2003: Dynamo Moscow
- 2005: Ural Great Perm
- 2005–2009: UNICS Kazan (assistant)
- 2009–2010: UNICS Kazan
- 2010–2012: Triumph Lyubertsy
- 2012–2015: Dnipro
- 2016–2017: Parma Perm (assistant)
- 2017–2018: Dzūkija Alytus (assistant)
- 2018–2020: Dzūkija Alytus

Career highlights
- As player: FIBA Intercontinental Cup champion (1986); 3× USSR League champion (1985–1987); Lithuanian All-Star Game MVP (1999); As head coach: Ukrainian Super League champion (2016)
Medals
Men's basketball
Representing the Soviet Union
Summer Olympics
Gold medal – first place	1988 Seoul
Representing Lithuania
Bronze medal – third place	1992 Barcelona
FIBA World Cup
Representing the Soviet Union
Gold medal – first place	1982 Colombia
Silver medal – second place	1986 Spain
FIBA EuroBasket
Representing the Soviet Union
Gold medal – first place	1979 Italy
Bronze medal – third place	1983 France
Gold medal – first place	1985 West Germany
Silver medal – second place	1987 Greece
Bronze medal – third place	1989 Yugoslavia
Representing Lithuania
Silver medal – second place	1995 Greece
Representing the Soviet Union
European U-18 Championship
Gold medal – first place	1978 Italy	Under-18 Team

Valdemaras Chomičius (also known as Valdemaras Homicius; born 4 May 1959) is a Lithuanian former professional basketball player. He represented the Soviet Union and Lithuania national teams, and was an assistant coach for Lithuania.

== Career ==
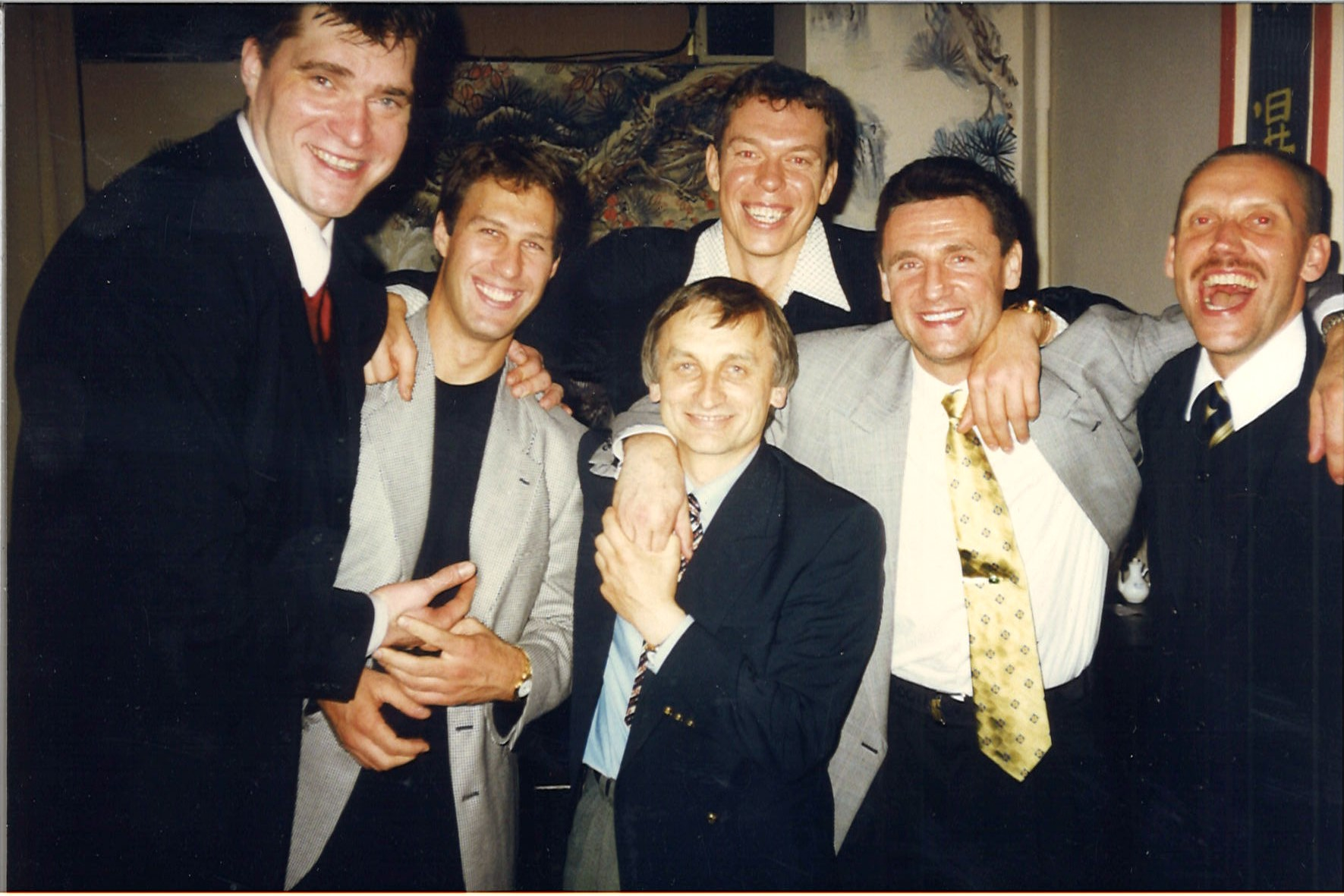
Chomičius with his former Soviet Union men's national team teammates with whom he won the 1988 Summer Olympics basketball tournament. Following Lithuania's independence restoration in 1990, Olympic champions Chomičius, Arvydas Sabonis, Šarūnas Marčiulionis, Rimas Kurtinaitis played for the Lithuania men's national team.

As a 192 cm (6 ft 3 1/2 in) tall point guard he is best remembered as the captain from the "golden years" of Žalgiris Kaunas by winning three consecutive USSR League championships against the rival CSKA Moscow in 1985–1987. His former teams include Žalgiris Kaunas, Forum Valladolid, CAI Zaragoza. He also has played in Italy for Aprimatic Bologna (Serie A2) in the 1990–1991 season. He last played for Olimpas Žemaitija during the 1996–1997 season. He served as player-coach for Kraitenė Marijampolė, was the assistant coach with PBC Ural Great Perm from 1999 to 2004, also serving as head coach for the team in the 2004-2005 season. He briefly coached PBC Dynamo Moscow in 2003, and was the assistant coach for BC UNICS, serving as the team's head coach in the 2009-2010 season. He was also the head coach for Triumph Lyubertsy from 2010 to 2012, BC Dnipro from 2012 to 2015, and worked as a coach for BC Parma in the 2016–17 season. In 2018–2020 he was head coach for BC Dzūkija.

He head coached the Lithuania national team to win the FIBA Stanković Continental Champions' Cup in 2005 FIBA Stanković Continental Champions' Cup.

== Honors and awards ==
- Honored Master of Sports of the USSR: 1982
- Officer's Cross of the Order of the Grand Duke Gediminas: 1995
- Great Commander's Cross of the Order of Merit for Lithuania: 2003

== Filmography ==
Year	Title	Role	Notes	Ref
2004	Lietuvos Krepšinis 1920–2004	Himself	Documentary about basketball in Lithuania in 1920–2004.	
2012	Mes už... Lietuvą!	Himself	Documentary about the Lithuania men's national basketball team at the EuroBasket 2011 when Chomičius was an assistant coach.	
2014	Arvydas Sabonis. 11	Himself	Documentary about Arvydas Sabonis, a teammate of Chomičius in multiple teams.	
2023	Bilietas (The Ticket)	Himself	Documentary about the basketball club Žalgiris Kaunas in 1979–1989.	
