= John Taylor Collegiate =

Location
- 470 Hamilton Avenue; Winnipeg, Manitoba; Canada; 49.89065°N 97.31278°W

Information
- School type: Public high school
- Founded: 1964
- School board: St. James-Assiniboia
- Superintendent: Jenness Moffatt? (acting)
- Principal: Adam Lister
- Grades: 9 - 12
- Language: English
- Area: St. James-Assiniboia
- Team name: Pipers
- Website: www.sjasd.ca/school/johntaylor/

John Taylor Collegiate is a public 9-12 high school in Winnipeg, Manitoba, Canada. It is part of the St. James-Assiniboia School Division and is located at 470 Hamilton Avenue, in the Crestview area of Winnipeg. The school was founded in 1964 and commenced construction March 1964 with a proposal had a budget of $984,000. The architectural firm of Herman and St. Lawrence was hired and the school was named after a colonial settler of the area of the same name.

== Notable alumni ==
- Recording Artist Bif Naked aka Beth Torbert. Class of 1987.
- Recording Artist Brent Fitz Class of 1988.
- Canadian astronaut Robert Thirsk Class of 1971.
