= Virginijus Praškevičius =

Lithuanian basketball player

Personal information
- Born: 4 March 1974 (age 52) Kaunas, Lithuanian SSR, Soviet Union
- Listed height: 6 ft 9 in (2.06 m)
- Listed weight: 221 lb (100 kg)

Career information
- Playing career: 1993–2011
- Position: Power forward

Career history
- 1993–1995: Lavera Kaunas
- 1995–1998: Atletas Kaunas
- 1997: LaCrosse Bobcats
- 1997–1998: Žalgiris Kaunas
- 1998–2000: Beşiktaş
- 2000–2002: Telindus Ostende
- 2002–2003: Ülkerspor
- 2003–2004: Hapoel Tel Aviv
- 2004–2005: Ülkerspor
- 2005–2006: Upea Capo D'Orlando
- 2006–2007: Baloncesto Fuenlabrada
- 2008–2009: BC Šiauliai
- 2009–2010: Qianjiang Tan Tan
- 2010: Utena Juventus

Career highlights
- Belgian League MVP (2001)
Medals
Representing Lithuania
Men's basketball
FIBA EuroBasket
Gold medal – first place	2003 Sweden

Virginijus Praškevičius (born 4 March 1974) is a Lithuanian former professional basketball player. At a height of 2.06 m (6 ft 9 in) tall, he played at the power forward and center positions.

== Professional career ==
Praškevičius started playing with Banga Kaunas and in 1993–94 was bought by Lavera Kaunas. In 1995–96 decided to play for Atletas Kaunas together with Žydrūnas Ilgauskas. In January 1997 he passed to LaCrosse Bobcats in the Continental Basketball Association. On 18 September 1996, he signed with the Minnesota Timberwolves of National Basketball Association (NBA). However, Praškevičius did not play a single game for them and was loaned to the LaCrosse Bobcats of the Continental Basketball Association (CBA). On 19 February 1997, he was waived by the Timberwolves.

In 1997–98 he came back to his home town Kaunas to play for Atletas and then for Žalgiris. With the best Lithuanian team he won a Saporta Cup. Then he played two years for Beşiktaş Spor Kulubu in the Turkish Basketball League. In 2000 he passed to Basketball Club Oostende in Belgium, winning twice the Belgian National Championship and becoming once the MVP of the league. From 2002 until 2005 he played for Ülkerspor (but played for Hapoel Tel Aviv for one season), and he won twice the Turkish National Cup.

In 2005–06 he played for Upea Capo d'Orlando, in Italian Serie A1, in 2006–07 for Baloncesto Fuenlabrada in the Spanish ACB. His last professional team was Utena Juventus in Lithuania as he left professional sport on spring of 2010 at the age of 36.

== National team career ==
Praškevičius played with the Lithuania Under-22 junior national team. With Lithuania's junior national team, he won the gold medal at the 1996 FIBA Europe Under-20 Championship. He was also a member of the senior Lithuanian national team. He played at the EuroBasket 1997, the 1998 FIBA World Championship, the EuroBasket 1999, and the 2003, where he won a gold medal.

== Career statistics ==
Legend
GP	Games played	GS	Games started	MPG	Minutes per game
FG%	Field-goal percentage	3P%	3-point field-goal percentage	FT%	Free-throw percentage
RPG	Rebounds per game	APG	Assists per game	SPG	Steals per game
BPG	Blocks per game	PPG	Points per game	PIR	Performance index rating
**Bold**	Career high

=== EuroLeague ===
Year	Team	GP	GS	MPG	FG%	3P%	FT%	RPG	APG	SPG	BPG	PPG	PIR
2001–02	Telindus Ostende	14	14	**29.4**	.456	.325	**.721**	**6.1**	1.1	**.9**	**.5**	**15.9**	**13.0**
2002–03	Ülkerspor	20	**19**	28.4	**.473**	**.449**	.625	4.6	**1.6**	**.9**	.2	10.7	10.4
2004–05	Ülkerspor	**22**	5	17.2	.428	.403	.583	3.1	.6	.6	.0	5.4	4.9
Career		56	38	24.9	.457	.403	.676	4.4	1.1	.8	.2	9.9	8.9
