= CS Dinamo București (basketball) =

Romanian professional basketball club

BC Dinamo București / Dinamo Știința București
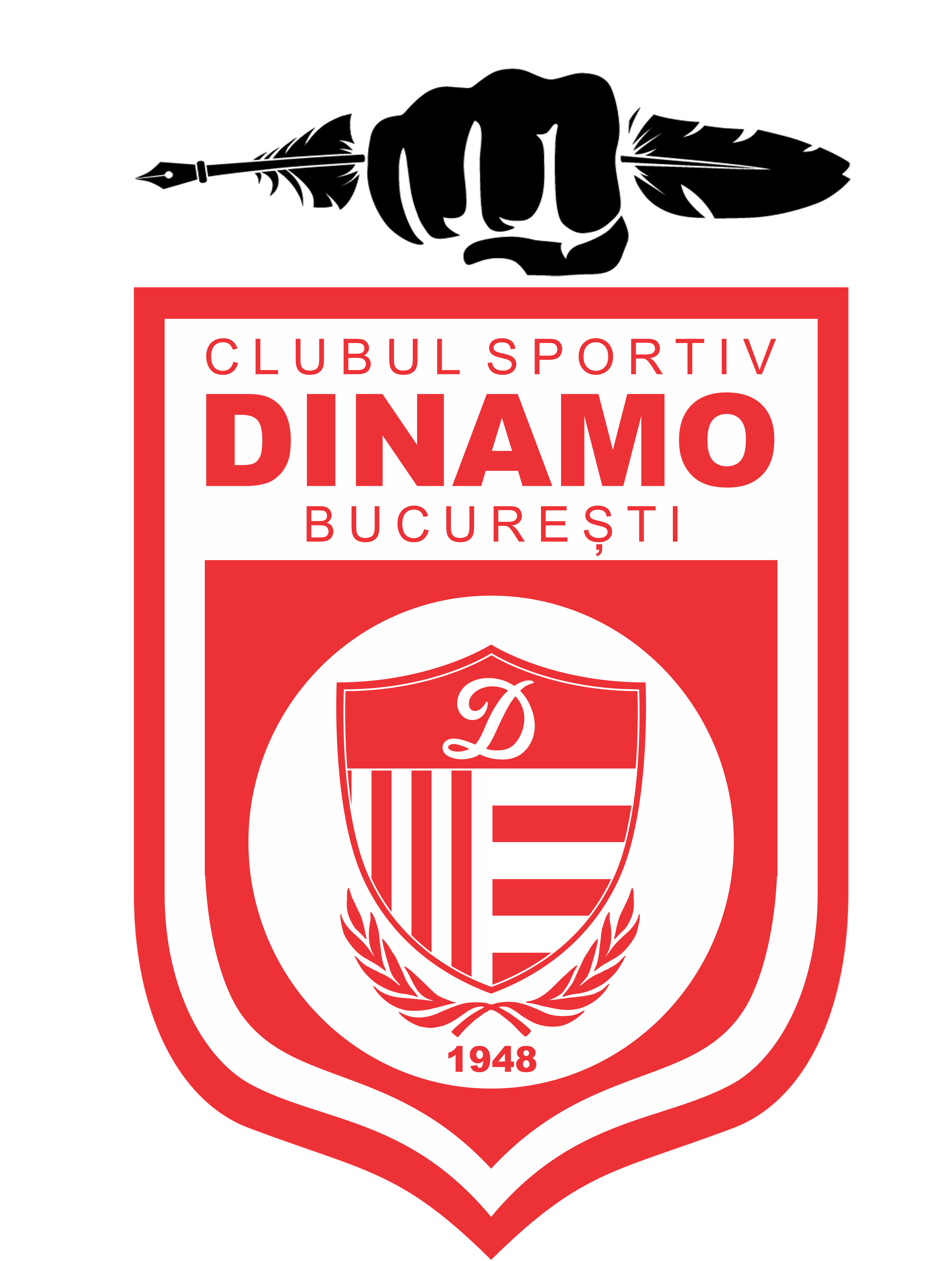
- Nickname: Câinii roșii (Red dogs)
- Leagues: Liga Națională; Europe Cup
- Founded: 1949; 77 years ago
- History: CS Dinamo București (1949–2003); Dinamo-Erbașu București (2003–2006); Dinamo Gealan București (2006–2009); CS Dinamo București (2009–2018); Dinamo Știința București (2018–present)
- Arena: Dinamo
- Capacity: 2,538
- Location: Bucharest, Romania
- Team colors: Red, White
- Main sponsor: SUPERBET
- President: George Cosac
- Head coach: Žydrūnas Urbonas
- Championships: 22 Romanian Leagues; 4 Romanian Cups
- Website: Official website
Home	Away

CS Dinamo București, formerly known as Dinamo-Erbașu or Dinamo Gealan, is a Romanian professional basketball club, based in Bucharest, Romania, which currently participates in the Liga Națională, the top-tier league in Romania. The team represents the basketball men's section of CS Dinamo București, a multi-sports club.

== History ==
CS Dinamo has won the Romanian championship 22 times.

At the end of 2009/10 season, the team was relegated to Division B for the first time in its history. They returned to Division A after one season. As of 2014 the team activates in the Romanian Liga I. In the 2014–15 season, Dinamo was the runner-up in the Liga I and promoted back to the Liga Națională

In 2018, the team started a collaboration with CSU Știința București, forming a new team: Dinamo Știința București. The project is based on the idea of a team formed by young Romanian basketball players, helped by experienced foreigners. In the first season, the team finished 8th, the best ranking in the recent years for the club and managed to reach the Romanian Cup Final Four.

== Trophies ==
- Romanian Champions (22)
  - 1953, 1954, 1955, 1957, 1965, 1968, 1969, 1970, 1971, 1972, 1973, 1974, 1975, 1976, 1977, 1979, 1983, 1988, 1994, 1997, 1998, 2003
- Romanian Cup (4)
  - 1967, 1968, 1969, 1980

== Current roster ==
Note: Flags indicate national team eligibility at FIBA-sanctioned events. Players may hold other non-FIBA nationalities not displayed.

Dinamo București roster
Players
Coaches

Pos.	No.	Nat.	Name	Ht.	Age
G	0	(Romania)	Mandisodza, Robin	1.80 m (5 ft 11 in)	23 – 26 July 2003
SF	1	(Romania)	Kuti, Nandor	1.97 m (6 ft 6 in)	29 – 10 January 1997
PG	2	(United States)	Stark, Jonathan	1.83 m (6 ft 0 in)	31 – 23 May 1995
G	10	(Romania)	Iordachescu, David-Andrei	1.89 m (6 ft 2 in)	17 – 10 April 2009
PF	11	(Romania)	Grasu, Ștefan	2.01 m (6 ft 7 in)	23 – 16 February 2003
SF	15	(Romania)	Novitskyi, Rostyslav	2.03 m (6 ft 8 in)	25 – 23 October 2000
F	21	(Romania)	Virna, Radu	1.91 m (6 ft 3 in)	29 – 8 September 1997
SF	22	(United States)	Roberts, Anthony	1.96 m (6 ft 5 in)	25 – 27 August 2001
C	23	(Guinea)	Drame, Ousmane	2.06 m (6 ft 9 in)	32 – 15 December 1993
G	42	(United States)	Marks, Derrick	1.91 m (6 ft 3 in)	33 – 14 September 1993
PF	55	(United States)	Burns, DJ	1.98 m (6 ft 6 in)	25 – 16 May 2001
F	70	(Romania)	Borcan, Vlad-Alexandru	1.90 m (6 ft 3 in)	17 – 22 August 2009

Head coach

- (Lithuania) Žydrūnas Urbonas

Assistant coach(es)

- (Lithuania) Renatas Kurilionokas
- (Romania) Bogdan-Constantin Stancut

Legend

- (C) Team captain
- Injured

- Roster
Updated: October 20, 2026

== Notable players ==
Note: Flags indicate national team eligibility at FIBA-sanctioned events. Players may hold other non-FIBA nationalities not displayed.

Criteria

To appear in this section a player must have either:

- Set a club record or won an individual award while at the club
- Played at least one official international match for their national team at any time
- Played at least one official NBA match at any time.

- (Romania) Nandor Kuti
- (Albania) (Kosovo) Ersid Ljuca
- (Croatia) Toni Katić
- (Lithuania) Modestas Kumpys
- (Poland) Jakub Wojciechowski
- (United States) Justin Baker
- (United States) Willie Kemp
- (United States) Michael Deloac

== See also ==
- CS Dinamo București
