= Dustin Boyd =

Kazakhstani-Canadian ice hockey player

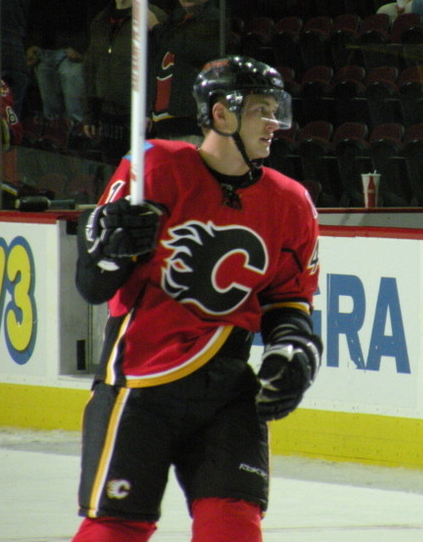
- Born: July 16, 1986 (age 40) Winnipeg, Manitoba, Canada
- Height: 6 ft 0 in (183 cm)
- Weight: 192 lb (87 kg; 13 st 10 lb)
- Position: Centre
- Shot: Left
- Played for: Calgary Flames; Nashville Predators; Montreal Canadiens; Barys Nur-Sultan; Dynamo Moscow
- National team: Kazakhstan
- NHL draft: 98th overall, 2004; Calgary Flames
- Playing career: 2006–2020

Dustin James Boyd (born July 16, 1986) is a Canadian-Kazakhstani former professional ice hockey player. He was most recently under contract with Barys Nur-Sultan of the Kontinental Hockey League (KHL).

== Playing career ==
After playing two seasons with the Moose Jaw Warriors of the Western Hockey League (WHL), Boyd was selected 98th overall in the third round of the 2004 NHL Entry Draft by the Calgary Flames. He made his NHL debut for the Flames on November 1, 2006, in a 3–2 away loss to the Detroit Red Wings. He played two games for the Flames before being returned to Omaha.

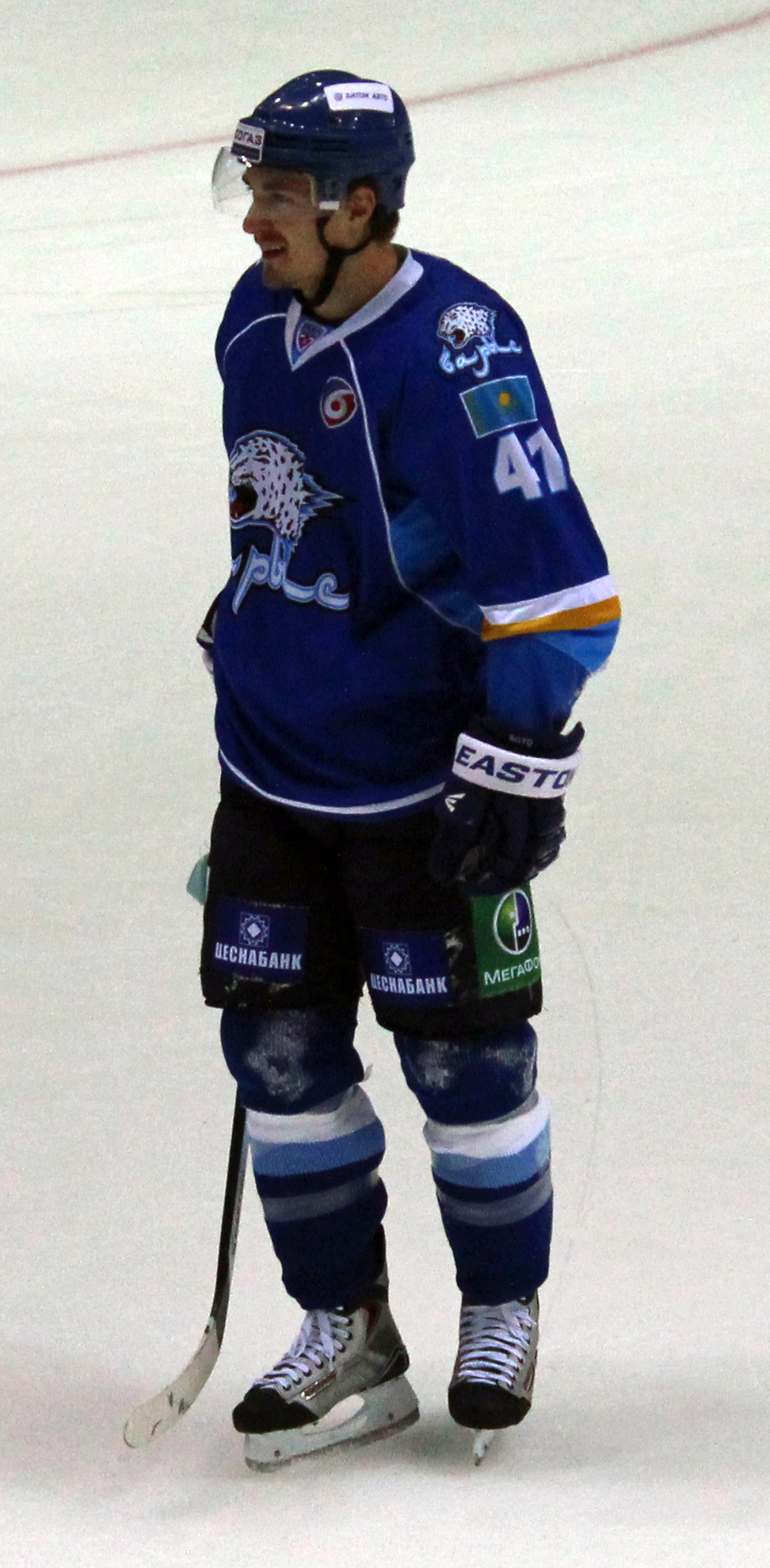
Boyd with Barys Astana in 2013.

He scored his first NHL goal on January 6, 2007, on Marty Turco of the Dallas Stars. It was the game-winning goal. On Remembrance Day, November 11, 2008, Boyd received his first First Star of the Game in scoring two goals against the Toronto Maple Leafs in a 4–3 win.

In the 2009–10 season, his fourth with the Flames, he was traded to the Nashville Predators for a fourth round draft pick at the trade deadline on March 3, 2010.

On June 29, 2010, he was traded by the Predators, along with teammate Dan Ellis, to the Montreal Canadiens in exchange for Sergei Kostitsyn. Two days later he then signed as a free agent to a one-year contract with the Canadiens on July 1, 2010. On November 8, 2010, he was placed on waivers by the Canadiens. He cleared waivers and was sent down to their AHL affiliate, the Hamilton Bulldogs. He remained under contract with Montreal and was called up and sent down once more.

On May 31, 2011, Boyd left the NHL and signed a one-year contract with Kazakh based KHL team, Barys Astana. Over the course of the next six seasons with Barys, Boyd became a cult player for the club alongside fellow imports Brandon Bochenski and Nigel Dawes.

Upon the retirement of Bochenski following the 2016–17 season, Boyd opted to leave Barys as a free agent but continue in the KHL in securing a two-year deal with Dynamo Moscow on July 19, 2017.

During the final year of his contract with Dynamo in the 2018–19 season, Boyd was scoreless in 5 appearances before leaving the club and returning to Barys Astana for the remainder of the campaign on September 27, 2018.

== International play ==
Medal record

Representing Canada

Ice hockey

World Junior Championships
Gold medal – first place	2006 Canada	

Boyd was also a member of the Canadian gold-medal-winning team in the 2006 World Junior Ice Hockey Championships.

On March 24, 2016, the IIHF announced it had approved a request to allow Boyd, Brandon Bochenski and Nigel Dawes to play for Kazakhstan at the 2016 IIHF World Championship.

== Personal life ==
Born and raised in Winnipeg, Manitoba, Boyd graduated from Westwood Collegiate in 2004.

== Career statistics ==
=== Regular season and playoffs ===
			Regular season					Playoffs
Season	Team	League	GP	G	A	Pts	PIM	GP	G	A	Pts	PIM
2002–03	Moose Jaw Warriors	WHL	63	11	17	28	15	13	0	3	3	2
2003–04	Moose Jaw Warriors	WHL	72	18	20	38	40	10	2	2	4	8
2004–05	Moose Jaw Warriors	WHL	66	26	35	61	57	5	1	2	3	2
2005–06	Moose Jaw Warriors	WHL	64	48	42	90	34	22	7	11	18	10
2006–07	Omaha Ak–Sar–Ben Knights	AHL	66	27	33	60	34	6	1	1	2	0
2006–07	Calgary Flames	NHL	13	2	2	4	4	—	—	—	—	—
2007–08	Quad City Flames	AHL	18	2	7	9	4	—	—	—	—	—
2007–08	Calgary Flames	NHL	48	7	5	12	6	—	—	—	—	—
2008–09	Calgary Flames	NHL	71	11	11	22	10	5	1	0	1	0
2008–09	Quad City Flames	AHL	5	2	0	2	2	—	—	—	—	—
2009–10	Calgary Flames	NHL	60	8	11	19	15	—	—	—	—	—
2009–10	Nashville Predators	NHL	18	3	2	5	4	4	0	0	0	0
2010–11	Montreal Canadiens	NHL	10	1	0	1	2	—	—	—	—	—
2010–11	Hamilton Bulldogs	AHL	47	20	9	29	22	20	5	11	16	10
2011–12	Barys Astana	KHL	53	18	15	33	16	6	3	2	5	0
2012–13	Barys Astana	KHL	51	15	16	31	10	7	1	5	6	2
2013–14	Barys Astana	KHL	49	18	20	38	41	10	2	3	5	4
2014–15	Barys Astana	KHL	58	19	34	53	24	7	2	3	5	0
2015–16	Barys Astana	KHL	51	20	21	41	45	—	—	—	—	—
2016–17	Barys Astana	KHL	30	8	6	14	6	10	5	1	6	10
2017–18	Dynamo Moscow	KHL	48	8	11	19	14	—	—	—	—	—
2018–19	Dynamo Moscow	KHL	5	0	0	0	4	—	—	—	—	—
2018–19	Barys Astana	KHL	51	6	9	15	26	12	2	2	4	4
2019–20	Barys Nur–Sultan	KHL	51	12	8	20	12	5	1	1	2	2
NHL totals			210	31	31	62	39	9	1	0	1	0
KHL totals			447	124	140	264	198	57	16	17	33	22

=== International ===
Year	Team	Event	Result	GP	G	A	Pts	PIM
2006	Canada	WJC	1st place, gold medalist(s)	6	4	2	6	0
2016	Kazakhstan	WC	16th	7	2	3	5	2
2017	Kazakhstan	WC D1A	19th	5	0	3	3	2
2019	Kazakhstan	WC D1A	17th	5	1	1	2	0
2020	Kazakhstan	OGQ	DNQ	3	2	1	3	0
Junior totals				6	4	2	6	0
Senior totals				20	5	8	13	4

== Awards and honours ==
Award	Year
WHL
East First All-Star Team	2006
