= KK Olimpas =

- Leagues: National Basketball League (Lithuania)
- Founded: 1989
- History: Olimpas (1989–1997); Olimpas Žemaitija (1997–1998); Olimpas (1998–1999); Plungė-SM (1999–2011); Olimpas (2011–present)
- Arena: Plungė Arena
- Capacity: 1,500
- Location: Plungė, Lithuania
- Team colors: Green, yellow and white
- President: Mindaugas Tamušauskas
- Head coach: Alidas Žukauskas
- Championships: List: 1 LKL silver medal winners (1997); 1 LKL bronze medal winners (1996); 2 RKL champions (2012, 2024); 2 RKL silver medal winners (2010, 2011); 1 RKL B division champions (2016)
Home	Away

KK Olimpas is a basketball team based in Plungė, Lithuania. The team currently competes in the second-tier National Basketball League (NKL). The club previously competed in the first-tier Lithuanian Basketball League (LKL) and second-tier National Basketball League (NKL).

== History ==
The team was founded in 1989. In 1993, the club competed in the Lithuanian Basketball League (LKL), falling to BC Lavera in the quarterfinals. The team was led by Augenijus Vaškys, who averaged the highest number of points per game for that season – 22.9. The next season, the team signed two Americans – Patrick Jones and Tim Brooks. The team finished in seventh place in the group stage, upsetting Žalgiris Kaunas and Atletas Kaunas in the last few group stage games to secure a ticket to the LKL playoffs. However, the team again lost in the quarterfinals, this time to the star–studded BC Atletas 2–1.

Patrick Jones, who was second in the league in points per game with 24.4, left the team before the start of the 1995–1996 season. He was replaced by the Canadian sharpshooter Joey Vickery, who continued the Olimpas tradition of nearly leading the LKL in points per game with 21.7. After a successful run in the group stage, the team finally won the quarterfinal match and advanced to the semifinal, where it lost to Žalgiris in two close matches. The team also participated in the FIBA European Cup Second Qualifying Round that season, losing to Dynamo Moscow.

The team opened a new chapter in its history the following season by merging with the LKKA champion BC Mažeikiai and forming BC Žemaitijos Lokiai, or Žemaitijos Olimpas, as the team was known in the LKL. The team lost many of its leaders; Vickery and Brooks left the team, as well as head coach Rimantas Endrijaitis, who successfully coached Olimpas for two seasons. The team, however, acquired new talent: Latvian Olympian Igors Miglinieks, American center Willie B. Kelly, and former Mažeikiai leader Darius Staugaitis. With those players at the helm, the team won the 1997 Korać Cup qualifying round against Dinamo Tbilisi, but finished third in the preliminary round and did not advance further. Coaching changes in the middle of the season brought Valdemaras Chomičius and Jeremiah Walker into the team, with the former serving as a playing coach. Chomičius' team made it to the LKL finals for the first time in its history, where it lost to Žalgiris Kaunas in three games.

Such success in the LKL guaranteed Žemaitijos Olimpas a spot in the FIBA European Cup for the 1997–1998 season. Although the team lost Miglinieks, Kelly, Walker and Staugaitis, it celebrated Brooks' return, who had spent the year playing in France. Brooks and Vaškys led the team in its efforts to advance to the second round of the European Cup; however, they were not enough as the team finished in fifth place in the group stage with 2 wins and 8 losses. The team's performance in the LKL also waned; the team lost to Lietuvos rytas in the quarterfinals.

In 1998, the team's name was changed back to Olimpas Plungė. Financial difficulties forced the team to forego participation in the LKL, participating in the 1998-1999 season in the second-tier LKAL, and later, participating in minor leagues.

Olimpas was reestablished in 2011 and participated in the third-tier RKL. The very first season, Olimpas finished first in the league and was promoted to the NKL.

== Current roster ==
Olimpas Plungė roster
Players
Coaches

Pos.	No.	Nat.	Name	Ht.	Wt.	Age
SF	2	(Lithuania)	Maziliauskas, Motiejus	2.02 m (6 ft 8 in)	98 kg (216 lb)	21 – 4 November 2004
PF	4	(United States)	Golson Jr., Colin	1.96 m (6 ft 5 in)	100 kg (220 lb)	24 – 17 February 2002
PG	8	(Lithuania)	Jurkaitis, Modestas	1.87 m (6 ft 2 in)	89 kg (196 lb)	31 – 17 April 1995
SG	10	(Lithuania)	Adomauskas, Arijus	1.90 m (6 ft 3 in)	85 kg (187 lb)	24 – 30 August 2001
C	11	(Lithuania)	Budrys, Tadas	2.05 m (6 ft 9 in)	125 kg (276 lb)	23 – 17 June 2002
G	12	(France)	Tsamas, Christopher	1.80 m (5 ft 11 in)	75 kg (165 lb)	24 – 12 April 2002
G/F	13	(Lithuania)	Motužis, Matas	1.86 m (6 ft 1 in)	71 kg (157 lb)	18 – 8 March 2008
SF	18	(Lithuania)	Vaištaras, Arnas	1.98 m (6 ft 6 in)	90 kg (198 lb)	18 – 29 September 2007
C	21	(Lithuania)	Piekus, Petras	2.11 m (6 ft 11 in)	113 kg (249 lb)	25 – 28 August 2000
G	22	(United States)	Miles, Thomas	1.88 m (6 ft 2 in)	85 kg (187 lb)	27 – 18 September 1998
G/F	23	(Lithuania)	Kreišmontas, Rokas	1.95 m (6 ft 5 in)	91 kg (201 lb)	20 – 23 January 2006
G	27	(Lithuania)	Bračkus, Julius	1.92 m (6 ft 4 in)	80 kg (176 lb)	16 – 19 June 2009

Head coach

- (Lithuania) Mindaugas Tamušauskas

Assistant coach(es)

- (Lithuania) Andrius Motužis

Athletic trainer(s)

- (Lithuania) Jogailė Petrokaitė

Legend

- (C) Team captain
- Injured

- Roster
Updated: October 24, 2025

== Season by season ==
Season	Tier	League	Pos.
1993–94	1	LKL	6th
1994–95	1	LKL	7th
1995–96	1	LKL	3rd
1996–97	1	LKL	2nd
1997–98	1	LKL	Quarterfinals
1998–99	2	LKAL	20th
2009–10	3	RKL	2nd
2010–11	3	RKL	2nd
2011–12	3	RKL	1st
2012–13	2	NKL	Quarterfinals
2013–14	2	NKL	15th
2015–16	4	RKL B division	1st
2016–17	3	RKL	Round of 16
2017–18	3	RKL	4th
2018–19	3	RKL	4th
2019–20	3	RKL	—^{1}
2020–21	3	RKL	Quarterfinals
2021–22	3	RKL	Quarterfinals
2022–23	3	RKL	Quarterfinals
2023–24	3	RKL	1st
2024–25	2	NKL	14th

^1 Cancelled due to the COVID-19 pandemic in Europe.

== Notable players ==
- (Lithuania) Augenijus Vaškys (1993–1998)
- (Lithuania) Mindaugas Pranckevičius (1993–1998)
- (Lithuania) Evaldas Jocys (1993–1996; 1997; 2011–2013)
- (Lithuania) Darius Staugaitis (1996–1997)
- (Lithuania) Valdemaras Chomičius (1996–1998)
- (Lithuania) Romanas Brazdauskis (1997–1998)
- (United States) Tim Brooks (1994–1996; 1997–1998)
- (United States) Patrick Jones (1994–1995)
- (United States) Jeremiah Walker (1996–1997)
- (Canada) Joey Vickery (1995–1996)
- (Latvia) Igors Miglinieks (1996–1997)

== Head coaches ==
- Genadijus Glikmanas (1990–1994)
- Rimantas Endrijaitis (1994–1996)
- Henrikas Giedraitis (1996)
- Valdemaras Chomičius (1996–1998)
- Genadijus Glikmanas (1998)
- Alidas Žukauskas (2011–unknown)
- Mindaugas Tamušauskas (2024–present)
