= Jordan Herdman-Reed =

Canadian gridiron football player (born 1994)

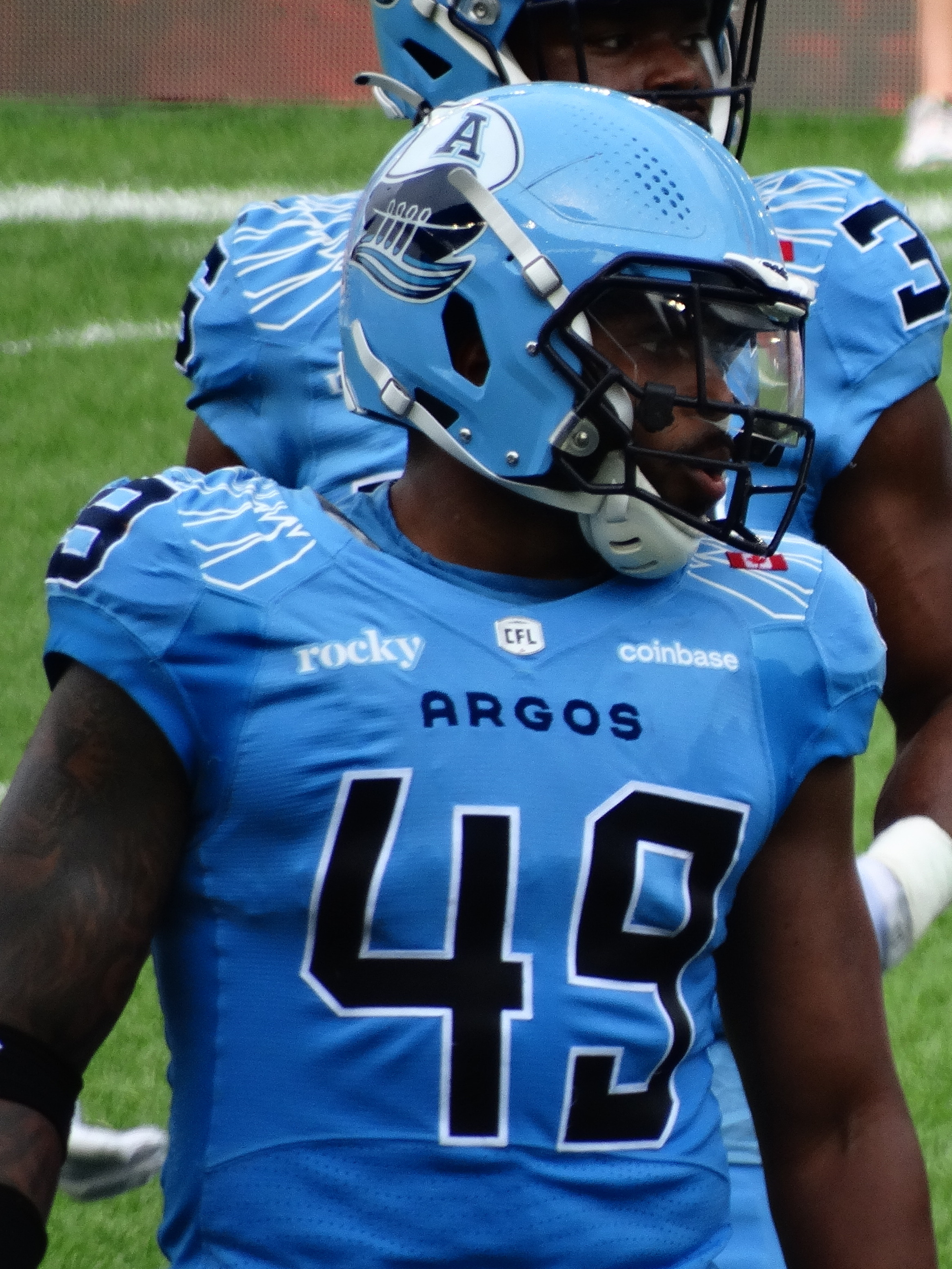
- Herdman-Reed with the Toronto Argonauts in 2025

No. 49 – Toronto Argonauts
- Position: Linebacker
- CFL status: National

Personal information
- Born: July 21, 1994 (age 32); Winnipeg, Manitoba, Canada
- Listed height: 6 ft 0 in (1.83 m)
- Listed weight: 235 lb (107 kg)

Career information
- High school: Sturgeon Heights
- College: Simon Fraser
- CFL draft: 2017: 7th round, 60th overall pick

Career history
- 2017–2020: BC Lions
- 2021–2022: Saskatchewan Roughriders
- 2023: BC Lions*
- 2023: Calgary Stampeders
- 2024: Saskatchewan Roughriders
- 2025–present: Toronto Argonauts
- * Offseason or practice squad member only

Awards and highlights
- 2x GNAC Defensive Player of the Year
- Stats at CFL.ca

Jordan Herdman-Reed (born July 21, 1994) is a Canadian professional football linebacker for the Toronto Argonauts of the Canadian Football League (CFL). He played college football with the Simon Fraser Clan. His twin brother Justin Herdman-Reed also played in the CFL.

== Professional career ==
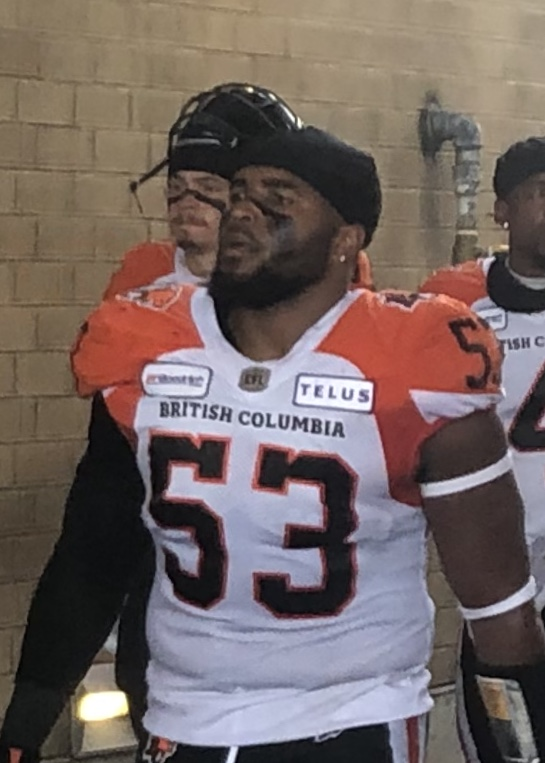
Herdman-Reed with the BC Lions in 2019.

=== BC Lions (first stint) ===
Herdman-Reed was drafted 60th overall in the 2017 CFL draft by the BC Lions and signed with the team on May 23, 2017. He played in his first regular season game in the team's season opener on June 24, 2017 against the Edmonton Eskimos. He played in all 18 games where he recorded two defensive tackles and 19 special teams tackles. In 2018, he again played in 18 regular season games, but featured more prominently on defense as he had 56 defensive tackles, 17 special teams tackles, and two sacks. He also played in his first playoff game on November 11, 2018 where he recorded four defensive tackles in the Lions' loss to the Hamilton Tiger-Cats.

For the 2019 season, Herdman-Reed played in 16 regular season games and had 37 defensive tackles, eight special teams tackles, one sack, and one forced fumble as the team struggled to a 5-13 season. He did not play in 2020 due to the cancellation of the 2020 CFL season and his contract expired in 2021.

=== Saskatchewan Roughriders (first stint) ===
On the first day of free agency in 2021, Herdman-Reed signed with the Saskatchewan Roughriders on February 9, 2021. He played in nine regular season games where he recorded one defensive tackle and two special teams tackles. He became a free agent upon the expiry of his contract on February 8, 2022. After initially remaining unsigned to start the 2022 season, Herdman-Reed re-signed with the Roughriders on August 8, 2022. He played in eight regular season games where he recorded four special teams tackles. He became a free agent upon the expiry of his contract on February 14, 2023.

=== BC Lions (second stint) ===
On February 15, 2023, it was announced that Herdman-Reed had re-signed with the Lions. However, he was released upon the signing of Jonathan Kongbo on May 21, 2023.

=== Calgary Stampeders ===
On May 24, 2023, Herdman-Reed signed with the Calgary Stampeders. He played in 16 regular season games where he recorded ten special teams tackles. He became a free agent upon the expiry of his contract on February 13, 2024.

=== Saskatchewan Roughriders (second stint) ===
On February 13, 2024, Herdman-Reed signed with the Roughriders. He played in 13 regular season games where he had eight special teams tackles. He was with the team in training camp in 2025, but was part of the final cuts on May 31, 2025.

=== Toronto Argonauts ===
On July 29, 2025, it was announced that Herdman-Reed had signed with the Toronto Argonauts. He played in seven regular season games where he recorded five special teams tackles. He re-signed with the team on November 19, 2025.

On May 13, 2026, Herdman-Reed was released by the Argonauts. However, he was re-signed on September 10, 2026.

== Personal life ==
Herdman-Reed's twin brother, Justin Herdman-Reed, who is two minutes younger, also plays professionally as a linebacker. Their father, James Reed, was also a professional linebacker who played for the Philadelphia Eagles, Winnipeg Blue Bombers, Montreal Concordes, New Orleans Breakers, Washington Federals, Saskatchewan Roughriders, and Toronto Argonauts.
