= St. James Collegiate =

St. James Collegiate Institute

Location
- 1900 Portage Ave. Winnipeg, Manitoba, R3J 0J1; Canada; 49.8777°N 97.2201°W

Information
- School type: Public high school
- Motto: Disce ut vivas (Learn that you may live)
- School district: St. James-Assiniboia School Division
- Superintendent: Jenness Moffatt? (acting)
- Principal: Kyle Lizotte
- Grades: 9–12
- Enrollment: 560 (2024)
- Area: St. James-Assiniboia
- Colours: Navy & gold
- Mascot: Jimmie and Jay
- Team name: Jimmies
- Website: https://www.sjasd.ca/school/stjames

St. James Collegiate is a grade 9 to 12 secondary school in Winnipeg, Manitoba. It is part of the St. James-Assiniboia School Division. The school was the first secondary school established in 1951 in the division. It has a focus on academics, technology, applied commerce, anti-racism, science, environmental, land-based, diversity and cultural programming.
