= Mark Stone =

Canadian ice hockey player (born 1992)

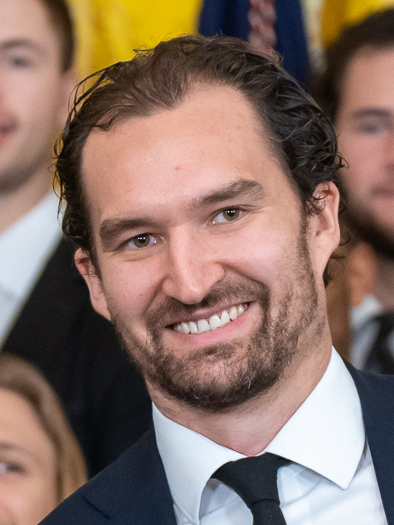
- Stone at the White House in November 2023
- Born: May 13, 1992 (age 34) Winnipeg, Manitoba, Canada
- Height: 6 ft 3 in (191 cm)
- Weight: 210 lb (95 kg; 15 st 0 lb)
- Position: Right wing
- Shoots: Right
- NHL team Former teams: Vegas Golden Knights; Ottawa Senators
- National team: Canada
- NHL draft: 178th overall, 2010; Ottawa Senators
- Playing career: 2012–present

Mark Stone (born May 13, 1992) is a Canadian professional ice hockey player who is a right winger and captain for the Vegas Golden Knights of the National Hockey League (NHL). He was selected by the Ottawa Senators in the sixth round, 178th overall, of the 2010 NHL entry draft.

Stone tied Johnny Gaudreau to lead all NHL rookies in scoring during the 2014–15 season with 64 points and received a nomination for the Calder Memorial Trophy as the NHL's top rookie. Stone is widely recognized as one of the NHL's premier two-way forwards, and has previously been a finalist for the Frank J. Selke Trophy recognizing this play. During the 2018–19 NHL season, he was traded to Vegas, signed a long-term contract with the team, and was named the first captain in team history in 2021.

Stone captained the Golden Knights to their first Stanley Cup championship during the 2022–23 season, notably scoring a hat-trick in the series clinching game five of the 2023 Stanley Cup Final.

== Playing career ==
=== Junior ===
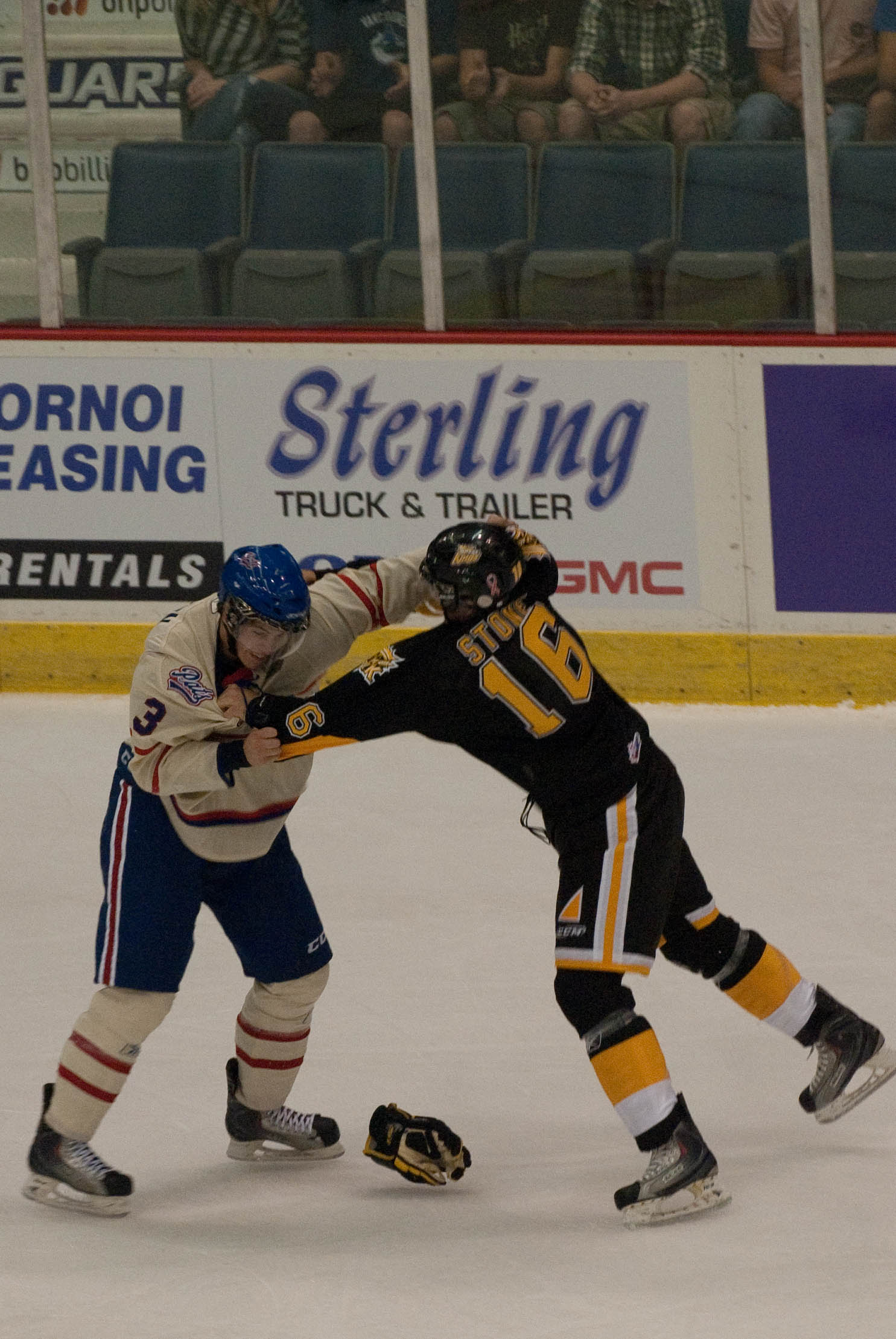
Stone (right) fights with Brandon Davidson of the Regina Pats in September 2010.

After a season with the Winnipeg Thrashers of the Manitoba Midget 'AAA' Hockey League, in which he competed in the 2008 Telus Cup, and won top scorer in the tournament, Stone began his major junior career with the Brandon Wheat Kings of the Western Hockey League (WHL) in 2008–09. He recorded 39 points (17 goals and 22 assists) over 56 games, tying for 12th in WHL rookie scoring. During the 2009 playoffs, he added four points (one goal and three assists) over 12 games. The following season began with Stone ranked in the top 50 on several major scouting lists for the upcoming 2010 NHL entry draft. Suffering a concussion and thumb injury during the season, he was limited to 28 points (11 goals and 17 assists) over 39 games, hindering his final draft ranking among scouts. Healthy during the playoffs, he competed in all the Wheat Kings' 15 contests, recording a goal and three assists. Although the Wheat Kings were eliminated in the WHL Conference Finals, they advanced to the 2010 Memorial Cup by way of having been chosen as the host team at the beginning of the year. Playing in the semi-final against the Calgary Hitmen, Stone competed opposite his older brother, Michael. The Wheat Kings beat the Hitmen in dramatic fashion to advance to the Memorial Cup Final, which they lost to the Windsor Spitfires; Stone had no points in five tournament games. During the off-season, he was selected in the sixth round, 178th overall, by the Ottawa Senators in the 2010 NHL Entry Draft. Stone was scouted as a power forward with weak skating.

Stone appeared in his first NHL training camp in September 2010 and was returned to junior for the subsequent season. Playing in his third WHL campaign, Stone emerged with 106 points (37 goals and 69 assists) over 71 games, first on his team and third in WHL scoring. His performance earned him a spot on the WHL East First All-Star Team at the end of the year. During the post-season, Stone recorded ten points over six games as the Wheat Kings were eliminated in the first round. Returning to the Senators' training camp for the second year, he was signed to a three-year, entry-level contract before being sent back to the Wheat Kings for the 2011–12 season. Back in junior, Stone was named Brandon's new team captain, replacing Shayne Wiebe, who had turned professional. Cory Clouston, the Senators' head coach from Stone's first training camp with the team, had been fired and became the Wheat Kings' new coach. He praised Stone as an intelligent hockey player and for improving his core strength from the previous year. During the season, he was selected to compete for Team WHL against the Russian under-20 select squad in the 2011 Subway Super Series. He recorded a goal and an assist in one of the contests on November 17, 2011, to be named the player of the game. In December 2011, Stone was chosen as one of 16 nominees for the 54th annual H. L. (Krug) Crawford Memorial Award for sporting excellence in southwestern Manitoba.

Stone concluded his junior career following the 2011–12 season by being named the winner of the Brad Hornung Trophy as the WHL's most sportsmanlike player, after finishing the season as the WHL's second-leading scorer with 123 points and being named an Eastern Conference First Team All-Star.

=== Professional ===
==== Ottawa Senators (2012–2019) ====
On April 20, 2012, the Ottawa Senators announced Stone would be joining the team and would likely make his NHL debut for the Senators on April 21 in game five of their first round playoff series against the New York Rangers. Stone did indeed play, recording an assist on the winning goal scored by Jason Spezza.

Stone made his NHL regular season debut nearly one year later, on March 6, 2013, against the Toronto Maple Leafs.

He scored his first NHL goal on January 4, 2014, against Carey Price of the Montreal Canadiens. Stone split the 2013–14 season between Ottawa and their American Hockey League (AHL) affiliate, the Binghamton Senators, recording four goals and eight points in 19 NHL games.

Stone made the Senators' opening night line-up for the 2014–15 season and subsequently enjoyed success on the all-rookie "Kid Line" alongside Mike Hoffman and Curtis Lazar. That offensive success resulted in the Senators announcing on November 7, 2014, that Stone would be staying with the NHL club for the remainder of the season. As the season progressed, Stone became one of Ottawa's top-six forwards, scoring 16 goals and 43 points in his first 62 games and receiving mention as a Calder Memorial Trophy candidate as the NHL's top rookie. He led all NHL players in scoring after the 2015 all-star break. Stone ended the 2014–15 season tied for the rookie scoring lead with the Calgary Flames' Johnny Gaudreau, with 64 points (26 goals, 38 assists) in 80 games, along with leading the NHL in takeaways (98). However, on April 15, Stone suffered a fractured wrist from a slash by Montreal player P. K. Subban. Subban was assessed a five-minute major and game misconduct as a result. Despite the injury, Stone appeared in all of the Senators' post-season games against the Canadiens, achieving four assists in six games, although the Senators ultimately lost the series.

On April 23, 2015, Stone was nominated for the Calder Memorial Trophy, though he ultimately finished second in voting to Florida Panthers' defenceman Aaron Ekblad. On June 25, 2015, Stone signed a three-year contract extension with the Senators worth an average annual value of $3.5 million, with former Senators general manager Bryan Murray calling Stone "one of [the team's] better players, if not one of the best".

Stone appeared in most of the Senators' games during the 2015–16 season, scoring 61 points across 75 games. He led the NHL in takeaways for the second-straight season and was one of the best-performing players after the All-Star Game break. On a March 30 game against the Winnipeg Jets, Dustin Byfuglien delivered a devastating bodycheck to Stone that forced Stone to immediately leave the ice for concussion tests. Though Stone returned to the ice later that game, he would not appear in the remaining games of the season.

During the 2016–17 season, Stone would score 54 points across 71 games and led the NHL in takeaways for the third-straight season with 96, surpassing second-placed Nick Schmaltz by 13.

Despite missing much of the 2017–18 season with injuries, Stone had a successful year production-wise with 62 points in 58 games. However, unable to come to terms with the Senators on a new contract, Stone filed for arbitration and was ultimately awarded a one-year extension that would make him an unrestricted free agent the following offseason.

Although there was prolonged speculation that he would not remain with the Ottawa Senators after he did not come to terms on a contract extension, Senators general manager Pierre Dorion revealed in a podcast interview in 2023 that Stone was willing to stay with the Senators and Dorion was prepared to sign him to an eight-year contract, but Senators owner Eugene Melnyk ultimately vetoed the potential signing.

==== Vegas Golden Knights (2019–present) ====
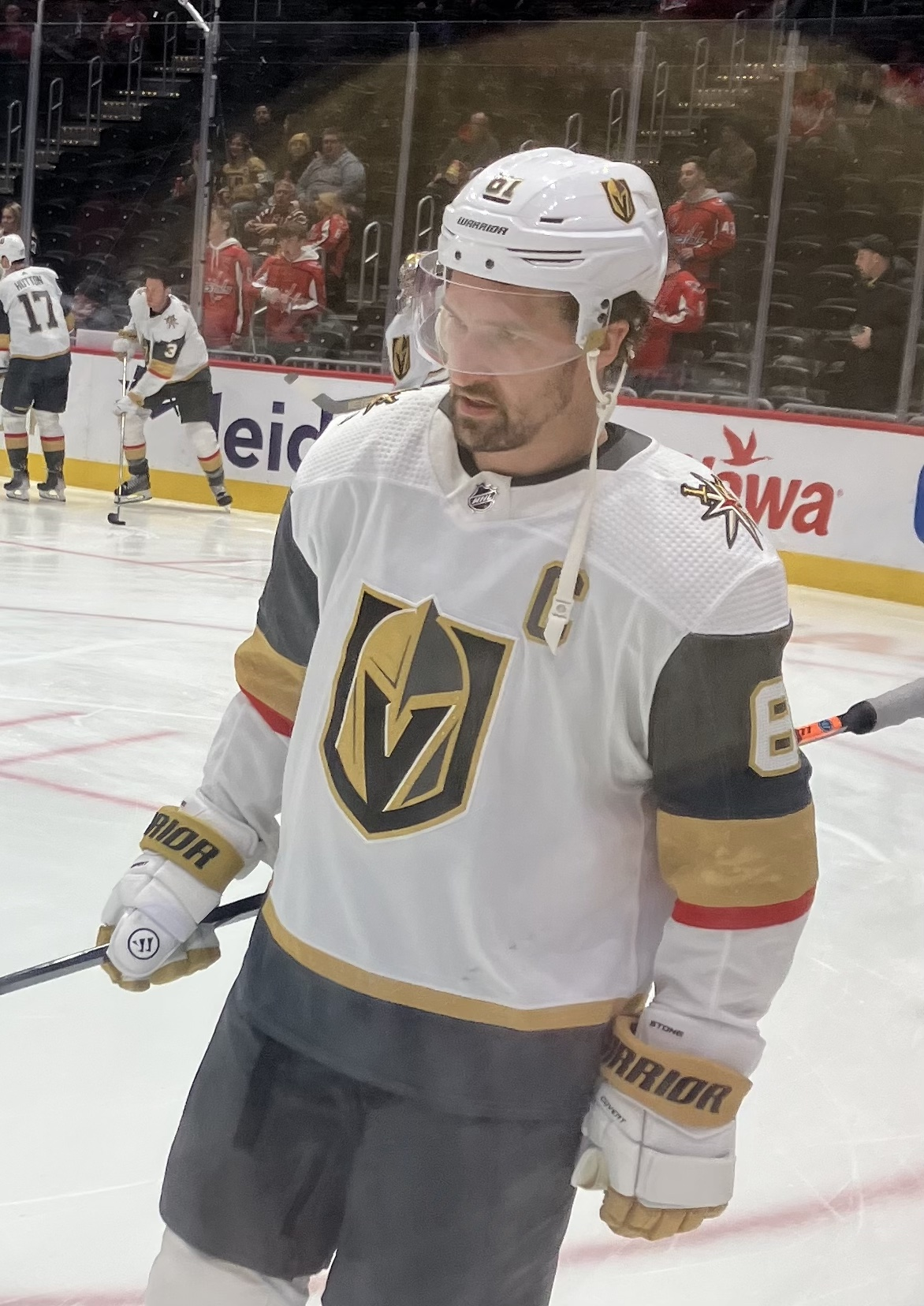
Stone with the Vegas Golden Knights in 2023

At the 2019 trade deadline, Stone was traded to the Vegas Golden Knights, along with Tobias Lindberg, in exchange for Erik Brännström, Oscar Lindberg and a 2020 second-round pick. On March 8, 2019, he officially signed an eight-year, US$76 million contract extension to remain in Vegas. Stone finished the season as the league leader in takeaways with 122. For his excellent two-way play during the regular season, Stone was a finalist for the Frank J. Selke Trophy as the league's best defensive forward on April 17, along with Patrice Bergeron of the Boston Bruins and the St. Louis Blues' Ryan O'Reilly.

On April 14, 2019, Stone recorded his first career hat-trick to power the Golden Knights to a 6–3 victory against the San Jose Sharks in game three of the 2019 Stanley Cup playoffs. In doing so, Stone became the first Golden Knight player to record a hat-trick in the playoffs. The Golden Knights were eliminated by the Sharks in seven games in the first round, with Stone recording twelve total points from six goals and six assists. The following 2019–20 season ended prematurely as a result of the onset of the COVID-19 pandemic, but the NHL subsequently arranged to hold the 2021 Stanley Cup playoffs in a bubble in Edmonton and Toronto. The Golden Knights reached the Western Conference Final, before being eliminated by the Dallas Stars.

Having been one of the team's alternate captains since his arrival in 2019, in advance of the shortened 2020–21 season Stone was named the first captain in Vegas Golden Knights history. General manager Kelly McCrimmon stated "we felt we had the obvious guy and that this was the time to name a captain." The regular season was a major success for the Golden Knights, who finished second in the league, behind the Colorado Avalanche. The postseason ended in disappointment, with the Knights reaching the semi-finals only to be defeated by the Montreal Canadiens in a series in which Vegas had been considered heavy favourites at the outset. Stone's performance in the series was subject to significant criticism, with the Las Vegas Sun remarking that he had "played the worst hockey of his Golden Knights' tenure at the worst time" after he recorded no points in the six-game series. Stone assessed that "I got skunked this series."

Back problems that had begun following the 2021 playoffs plagued Stone through the 2021–22 season, in which he was able to play only 37 games. He returned in the closing stretch as the team attempted to salvage a playoff berth, but this came to naught and the Golden Knights missed the postseason for the first time in franchise history. Subsequent to this, Stone underwent a lumbar discectomy in May 2022.

Stone's lumbar surgery had initial success, and he was able to return to the team lineup for the 2022–23 season. However, on February 12, 2023, he reinjured his back in a game against the Florida Panthers. This required a second surgery within a nine-month span, raising concerns among many that Stone's playing career might be over. He missed the remainder of the regular season, with the Golden Knights placing him on the long-term injured reserve (LTIR) list at the end of February. Vegas then used the additional salary cap space created by Stone's LTIR to improve the team's roster, an action which was controversial to some in light of Stone being reactivated for the beginning of the 2023 Stanley Cup playoffs, when the salary cap no longer applied. Stone proved a key part of the Golden Knights' deep run to the 2023 Stanley Cup Final, where they defeated the Panthers in five games. He scored a hat trick in the Cup-clinching fifth game, becoming only the third NHL player to do so, and the first since Babe Dye of the Toronto St. Patricks in 1922. Stone finished fourth in voting for the Conn Smythe Trophy, awarded to the most valuable player of the postseason.

On September 12, 2026, Stone signed a two-year extension with Vegas, avoiding free agency and keeping him with the team through the 2028–29 season.

== International play ==
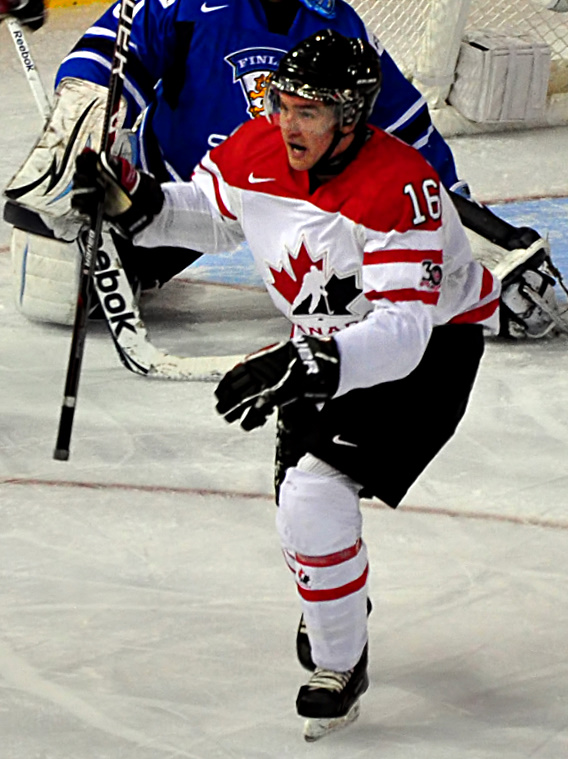
- Stone with Canada at the 2012 World Junior Championships

Medal record

Ice hockey

Representing Canada

Olympic Games
Silver medal – second place	2026 Milano Cortina	

World Championships
Gold medal – first place	2016 Russia	
Silver medal – second place	2019 Slovakia	

4 Nations Face-Off
Winner	2025 Canada/United States	

World Junior Championships
Bronze medal – third place	2012 Canada	

Stone was selected to Canada's junior team for the 2012 World Junior Championships, held in Alberta. He began the tournament with a hat-trick and an assist in the first contest, an 8–1 win against Finland, and consequently was named Canada's player of the game. After losing their semi-final against Russia, Canada defeated Finland to win the bronze medal. Finishing the tournament with a team-leading seven goals and ten points, Stone was named one of Canada's three best players, as selected by the coaches. Stone was named to Team Canada at the 2016 World Championships, which won the gold medal.

On April 29, 2019, Stone was named to the Team Canada roster for the 2019 IIHF World Championship held in Slovakia. On May 10, 2019, he was designated an alternate captain, along with Sean Couturier. He helped Canada progress through to the playoff rounds before losing the final to Finland to finish with the Silver Medal on May 26, 2019. Stone finished the tournament co-leading alongside Anthony Mantha with 14 points in 10 games. He was named the tournament's Most Valuable Player by the media.

On December 31, 2025, he was named to Canada's roster to compete at the 2026 Winter Olympics.

== Personal life ==
Stone was born in Winnipeg, Manitoba, to parents Rob and Jackie. He attended Westwood Collegiate high school. His older brother, Michael, also played in the NHL as a defenceman with the Calgary Flames. The two have competed against each other in the WHL as well as in the 2010 Memorial Cup, as Michael played for the Calgary Hitmen. The two played against each other at the NHL level for the first time on January 31, 2015, when the Senators defeated the Arizona Coyotes 7–2. Stone is the brother in law of Cody Ceci, who currently plays for the Los Angeles Kings; Stone and Ceci are married to sisters Hayley and Jamie, who Stone and Ceci both met when they played for the Ottawa Senators. The Stones have one child, a girl.

== Career statistics ==
=== Regular season and playoffs ===
			Regular season					Playoffs
Season	Team	League	GP	G	A	Pts	PIM	GP	G	A	Pts	PIM
2008–09	Brandon Wheat Kings	WHL	56	17	22	39	27	12	1	3	4	4
2009–10	Brandon Wheat Kings	WHL	39	11	17	28	25	15	1	3	4	4
2010–11	Brandon Wheat Kings	WHL	71	37	69	106	28	6	1	9	10	4
2011–12	Brandon Wheat Kings	WHL	66	41	82	123	22	8	2	4	6	6
2011–12	Ottawa Senators	NHL	—	—	—	—	—	1	0	1	1	0
2012–13	Binghamton Senators	AHL	54	15	23	38	14	3	1	2	3	0
2012–13	Ottawa Senators	NHL	4	0	0	0	2	1	0	0	0	0
2013–14	Binghamton Senators	AHL	37	15	26	41	6	4	1	3	4	0
2013–14	Ottawa Senators	NHL	19	4	4	8	4	—	—	—	—	—
2014–15	Ottawa Senators	NHL	80	26	38	64	14	6	0	4	4	2
2015–16	Ottawa Senators	NHL	75	23	38	61	38	—	—	—	—	—
2016–17	Ottawa Senators	NHL	71	22	32	54	25	19	5	3	8	20
2017–18	Ottawa Senators	NHL	58	20	42	62	10	—	—	—	—	—
2018–19	Ottawa Senators	NHL	59	28	34	62	22	—	—	—	—	—
2018–19	Vegas Golden Knights	NHL	18	5	6	11	5	7	6	6	12	2
2019–20	Vegas Golden Knights	NHL	65	21	42	63	27	20	7	10	17	6
2020–21	Vegas Golden Knights	NHL	55	21	40	61	28	19	5	3	8	0
2021–22	Vegas Golden Knights	NHL	37	9	21	30	8	—	—	—	—	—
2022–23	Vegas Golden Knights	NHL	43	17	21	38	10	22	11	13	24	8
2023–24	Vegas Golden Knights	NHL	56	16	37	53	22	7	3	0	3	2
2024–25	Vegas Golden Knights	NHL	66	19	48	67	14	10	4	4	8	0
2025–26	Vegas Golden Knights	NHL	60	28	45	73	9	17	7	5	12	10
NHL totals			766	259	448	707	238	129	48	49	97	50

=== International ===
Year	Team	Event	Result	GP	G	A	Pts	PIM
2009	Canada Western	U17	4th	6	2	5	7	0
2012	Canada	WJC	3rd place, bronze medalist(s)	6	7	3	10	2
2016	Canada	WC	1st place, gold medalist(s)	10	4	6	10	6
2019	Canada	WC	2nd place, silver medalist(s)	10	8	6	14	0
2025	Canada	4NF	1st place, gold medalist(s)	4	1	0	1	0
2026	Canada	OG	2nd place, silver medalist(s)	6	2	2	4	0
Junior totals				12	9	8	17	2
Senior totals				30	15	14	29	6

== Awards and honours ==
Award	Year	Ref
CHL / WHL
WHL East First All-Star Team	2011, 2012	
Brad Hornung Trophy	2012	
CHL Sportsman of the Year	2012	
NHL
NHL All-Rookie Team	2015	
NHL All-Star Game	2022	
Stanley Cup champion	2023	
International
World Championship MVP	2019	
World Championship All-Star Team	2019	

Sporting positions
Preceded by Position created	Vegas Golden Knights captain 2021–present	Incumbent
