= Joey Vickery =

Canadian basketball player

Personal information
- Born: June 9, 1967 (age 59) Winnipeg, Canada
- Listed height: 5 ft 10 in (1.78 m)
- Listed weight: 189 lb (86 kg)

Career information
- High school: Westwood (Winnipeg)
- College: Brandon (1985–1991)
- NBA draft: 1989: undrafted
- Playing career: 1995–2017
- Position: Point guard

Career history
- 1992: Winnipeg Thunder
- 1995–1996: Olimpas Plungė
- 1996–1997: CB Ciudad de Huelva
- 1997–2000: Poissy Chatou Basket
- 2000–2001: CB Ciudad de Algeciras
- 2001–2002: Mattersburg 49ers
- 2002–2003: CB Ciudad de Huelva
- 2003–2004: Jamtland Basket KFUM
- 2004–2005: Club Melilla Baloncesto
- 2005–2006: Mattersburg 49ers
- 2005–2008: Traiskirchen Lions
- 2008–2017: Mattersburg Rocks

Joey David Vickery (born 9 June 1967) is a Canadian former professional basketball player. At a height of 1.78 m (5 ft 10 in) tall, he played at the point guard position. He was the Lithuanian Basketball League's LKL All-Star Game Three-point Shootout Champion, in 1995. He last played for the Austrian basketball club Mattersburg Rocks.

== College career ==
Born in Winnipeg, Manitoba, Canada, Vickery graduated Westwood Collegiate in 1985, and played for the Brandon University Bobcats, for three seasons. After a successful debut, in which Brandon University won the Canadian National Championship in 1989, Vickery was named the Jack Donahue MVP award winner. Vickery was also named a 1st team All-Canadian, at Brandon University, in 1990 and 1991.

== Professional career ==
After college, Vickery moved to Europe, and he played for the now defunct Olimpas Plungė of Lithuania. He averaged 23.4 points and 3.3 rebounds per game. He also played for various clubs in Spain, like Huelva, Algeciras, and Melilla, and then moved to the Austrian club Mattersburg 49ers. After yet another successful season, he moved to Sweden's Jamtland Basket KFUM. In 2005, he returned to Austria, and signed a contract with his previous team.

== Clubs ==
- (Canada) Winnipeg Thunder (1992)
- (Canada) The Rogues, SIT, Scobey, MT 1995
- (Lithuania) Olimpas Plungė (1995–1996)
- Ciudad de Huelva, Spain (1996–1997)
- (France) Poissy Chatou Basket (1997–2000)
- Algeciras, Spain (2000–2001)
- (Austria) Mattersburg 49ers (2001–2002)
- Ciudad de Huelva, Spain (2002–2003)
- (Sweden) Jamtland Basket KFUM (2003–2004)
- Melilla, Spain (2004–2005)
- (Austria) Mattersburg 49ers (2005–2006)
- (Austria) Arkadia Traiskirchen Lions (2005–2008)
- Mattersburg Rocks, Austria (2008–2017)

== National team ==
=== Canadian university national team ===
Vickery played on two world university teams for Canada, first at the 1989 Duisburg, Germany Games, and in 1991, at the Sheffield, England Games. Canada finished 4th at the 1989 Duisburg Games, and won a silver medal at the games in Sheffield, England.

=== Canadian senior national team ===
Vickery was a member of the senior Canada national men's basketball team, at the 1995 Tournament of the Americas, and the 1997 Tournament of the Americas. He also appeared internationally in the 1994 FIBA World Championship, in Toronto, and the 1998 FIBA World Championship, in Athens. In 1994, Vickery was named the MVP of the Berlin Cup friendly tournament, after making 17 out of 20 three point field goal attempts during the tournament. The participating teams at the tournament were Canada, Russia, Germany, and Italy.
