= Lietuvos krepšinio lyga =

Lithuanian men's basketball league

Lietuvos krepšinio lyga (LKL)
- Founded: April 22, 1993; 33 years ago
- First season: 1993–94
- Country: Lithuania
- Confederation: FIBA Europe
- Number of teams: 10
- Level on pyramid: 1
- Relegation to: NKL
- Domestic cup: King Mindaugas Cup
- International cup(s): EuroLeague; EuroCup; Champions League; FIBA Europe Cup
- Current champions: Žalgiris (26th title) (2025–26)
- Most championships: Žalgiris (26 titles)
- President: Remigijus Milašius
- TV partners: BTV, Telia Play
- Website: en.lkl.lt
- 2026–27 season

Headquarters in Vilnius

Lietuvos krepšinio lyga (LKL; English: Lithuanian Basketball League), marketed as Betsson-LKL for sponsorship reasons, is the premier men's professional club basketball league in Lithuania. It is composed of 10 teams, and it is a member of the Lithuanian Basketball Federation. The best LKL clubs are also annual participants of the top European-wide basketball competitions, including the top-tier level EuroLeague.

On April 22, 1993, the Lietuvos krepšinio asociacija (LKA; English: Lithuanian Basketball Association) was founded. It was the first professional sports organisation in Lithuania. Lietuvos krepšinio lyga was built on the foundation of the LKA. Former basketball player Šarūnas Marčiulionis is named as the founder of the league. He was the first president of the LKL and served from 1993 to 2002. Remigijus Milašius is the current president of the league since 2013. The league's headquarters is located in Vilnius.

A total of 28 teams have competed in the LKL since its inception. Only two teams have been crowned champions, with Žalgiris Kaunas winning the title a record 24 times and Rytas Vilnius seven times.

The league is sponsored by Betsson, the Swedish online sportsbook and casino company, which also sponsors four teams in the league. The league was previously sponsored by the company's subsidiary Betsafe until it was renamed to "Betsson-LKL" in August 2025 after a sponsorship change.

== Competition format ==
The competition format follows a quadruple round-robin format, which means that during the course of a regular season, which lasts from late September to May, each club plays every other club four times, twice at home and twice away, for a total of 44 games. Teams receive one point for a win, and no points for a loss. Teams are ranked by total points, with the eight highest-ranked clubs at the end of the season plays the playoffs and the winner of the playoffs is crowned a champion.

=== Promotion and relegation ===
A system of promotion and relegation exists between the LKL and the NKL. The lowest placed team in LKL is relegated to the NKL, and the top team from the NKL promoted to LKL. However, the process of promotion and relegation rarely works since teams from NKL are unable to meet the league requirements. In the 2021–22 LKL season, for the first time since 2014–15 LKL season, 11 teams played in the league, NKL winner BC Jonava joined the existing 10 teams, while in the following 2022-23 LKL season, 12 teams played for the first time since 2013 because winners of NKL, BC Gargždai, got promoted. After bankruptcies hit some of the teams, league was left with 9 teams to start the 2025-26 LKL season Below is a complete record of how many teams played in each season throughout the league's history:

Number of clubs in LKL throughout the years
Period (in years)	No. of clubs
1993–1994	10 clubs
1994–1995	11 clubs
1995–1999	10 clubs
1999–2002	9 clubs
2002–2004	10 clubs
2004–2005	9 clubs
2005–2006	8 clubs
2006–2007	9 clubs
2007–2008	10 clubs
2008–2009	11 clubs
2009–2011	13 clubs
2011–2013	12 clubs
2013–2015	11 clubs
2015–2021	10 clubs
2021–2022	11 clubs
2022–2024	12 clubs
2024–2025	10 clubs
2025–present	9 clubs

=== Qualifying for European competitions ===
Žalgiris directly enters the EuroLeague as a licensed club. The highest-placed team, apart from licensed club Zalgiris, gets an invite to play in the EuroCup. The second and third highest-placed teams, apart from licensed club, get an invite to play in the Basketball Champions League.

In the 2025–26 season:

- Žalgiris competed in the EuroLeague. Qualified for playoffs but lost series 1–3 against Fenerbahçe Beko
- Lietkabelis and Neptūnas competed in the EuroCup
- Rytas competed in the Basketball Champions League and for the first time became Basketball Champions League champions
- Juventus competed in the Basketball Champions League Qualifying tournament. In the first qualifying match, they beat Karhu Kauhajoki and advanced to the next round, but lost there to UCAM Murcia.

== Community programs ==
In 2016, LKL started LKL Academy, a program offering students an opportunity to intern with LKL projects in marketing, communication and event organisation to gain experience working in the sports industry. Students are also awarded scholarships and many go on to work in the sports industry.

== History ==
=== Foundation and Žalgiris dominance ===
The Lithuanian Basketball Association was founded on 22 April 1993, when eight of the strongest Lithuanian basketball clubs' officials met with representatives of the Šarūnas Marčiulionis basketball fund in Vilnius. The original eight teams were: Žalgiris Kaunas, Atletas Kaunas, Drobė Kaunas, Statyba Vilnius, Olimpas Plungė, BC Šilutė, Lietkabelis Panevėžys and Neptūnas Klaipėda. This association would soon be renamed to Lietuvos krepšinio lyga (LKL) due to legal issues, also announcing there that would start in the upcoming fall. By the end of spring, before the season started, the LKA and their new league accepted two more teams – Lavera Kaunas and NECA Kaunas.

Following the 1993–94 season, the finalists of last season's LKAL, Sakalai Vilnius & BC Šiauliai joined the league, while Drobė Kaunas decided to withdraw due to financial difficulties. The 1994–95 season saw the league's foreign players emerge as star power, before they were more known to be role players. In the 1995–96 season the league continued to accept the champions of the LKAL to the league, Savy Alytus joined the league. Sharpshooter Joey Vickery became the first foreigner to lead the LKL in scoring for Olimpas. League officials would start pressuring teams to play in better arenas by setting up certain criteria that were necessary to get accepted into the league. That's why no more teams were accepted until 1998 when Olimpas Plungė went bankrupt and was replaced by BC Kraitienė based in Marijampolė. Some of the strongest teams like Šilutė and Atletas faded away to the bottom of the league and left the league.

During this time period, the league had been dominated by Žalgiris. They won the league's championship trophy for six consecutive years, from 1994 through 1999. Their main rival during those years was Atletas Kaunas led by Saulius Štombergas and a young Žydrūnas Ilgauskas acquired from Žalgiris' youth team. Ilgauskas was selected 20th overall in the 1996 NBA draft, making him the first NBA player coming straight from the LKL. In 1999 Žalgiris, led by Tyus Edney, became the first Lithuanian team to win the top European basketball competition, the EuroLeague title.

=== Golden era of Lithuanian basketball ===
In the 1999–2000 season, Lietuvos rytas shocked defending EuroLeague champions Žalgiris by ending their dominant run. That sparked most likely the biggest rivalry in Lithuanian sports, the competitiveness has brought over to politics and society between the two biggest cities in Lithuania.

=== Modern era ===
2010–11 saw Žalgiris reclaim the title, beating Lietuvos rytas 4–1. In the finals of 2012 Žalgiris was the winner again, by sweeping Lietuvos Rytas 3–0. During the 2013–14 season, Žalgiris defeated Neptūnas in the final.

The 2014–2015 season saw the introduction of the 'four wheel system', where all the teams have to play 40 games with no exceptions for teams competing in international competition like in the past. This year Žalgiris was able to finished 1st, but not before a dramatic win against Lietuvos rytas in the last game of the season 82–81.

"...there's no better advertisement for Lithuanian basketball than this match. The season is long, forty games, but everything is settled not only in the last game of the season, but in the last seconds of that game."

— Gintaras Krapikas, head coach of Žalgiris

Žalgiris continued to dominate in the playoffs sweeping rivals Lietuvos rytas once again in the final. Despite a familiar ending, the season was marked by the growing competitiveness of the league, Neptūnas joined Žalgiris and Lietuvos rytas as a powerhouse and this edition saw a couple of upsets and close games from teams such as Pieno žvaigždės and Juventus Utena. Although a strong competitor Prienai had an underwhelming season. However, the final saw a two usual suspects once again - Žalgiris and Lietuvos Rytas. The Greens once again took the trophy back home by beating rivals 4–0. Team from Kaunas was led by all around sharpshooters in James Anderson and Artūras Milaknis who averaged 15.3 and 14.3 points a piece. The latter was named the MVP of the finals.

Six 2015–16 LKL season teams participated in the European tournaments: Žalgiris (EuroLeague), Lietuvos rytas and Neptūnas (EuroCup), Juventus, Pieno žvaigždės, Šiauliai (FIBA Europe Cup). Lietkabelis, Vytautas and Nevėžis competed in the Baltic Basketball League. Dzūkija was the only LKL club not participating in any European or regional tournaments. The off-season moves by teams such as the rebranded Prienai (Vytautas Prienai–Birštonas), Lietkabelis and the continued work from last season's playoff seeds gave fans hope for one of the most competitive seasons in league history. During the season, Žalgiris won 1st place in the regular season, over Lietuvos rytas. In the playoffs, Neptūnas shocked everyone, by beating Rytas in the semifinals, and reaching the finals for the second time in club history. In the finals, Žalgiris beat Neptūnas 4–1 to win again.

The 2016–17 LKL season off-season saw the rise of Lietkabelis, as tensions between FIBA and the EuroLeague resulted into them receiving a wild card as replacement in the EuroCup and greatly improving their roster which included signing the Lavrinovič twins (Darjuš and Kšyštof). A record of 8 Lithuanian teams competed in a European tournament that season, which added to the ever-improving competitiveness of the league. Consequently, the LKL achieved the average attendance record, with more than 2,000 spectators per game, during the regular season. Only Lietkabelis was able to fight defending champion Žalgiris, as Žalgiris easily defeated other top contenders Lietuvos rytas and Neptūnas. In the LKL semifinals, Lietkabelis beat Lietuvos rytas 3–1, to advance to the finals for the first time - they lost to Žalgiris 4–1. Rytas won the third place over Neptūnas.

"Does not matter the strength of the opponent, no matter, if Žalgiris Kaunas or Rytas Vilnius wins, the result does not mater, it is important, that the Lord is with us."

— Pope Francis, during his speech with youngsters at the Cathedral Square in Vilnius, surprised by mentioning two strongest teams of the Lithuanian league.

In the 2018–19 LKL season, Dainius Adomaitis, the coach of the Lithuania men's national basketball team, joined the renamed BC Rytas as the new head coach. During the 2019 FIBA Basketball World Cup qualification, happening during the season, many LKL players debuted in the national team to play the games. BC Vytautas was renamed as BC SkyCop Prienai, signing veteran players like the Lavrinovič twins, Mindaugas Lukauskis and others. The team played improved basketball and reached the playoffs. Rytas won the King Mindaugas Cup, while BC Neptūnas finished the regular season in second place, earning home-court advantage for the semifinals for the first time in club history. Žalgiris once again won 1st place in the regular season. In the playoffs, while Žalgiris and Lietkabelis beat their opponents in sweeps, Rytas struggled against BC Juventus, 2–1, while Neptūnas defeated SkyCop 2–1. In the semifinals, Žalgiris easily swept Lietkabelis 2–0, while Rytas shocked Neptūnas with an even easier 2–0 sweep, even without home-court advantage. Setting up rematches from the previous year, the results remained the same - Neptūnas once again defeated Lietkabelis 3–0 in the 3rd place series, while Žalgiris easily defeated Rytas 3–0 in the finals.

During the 2019–20 season, the LKL board ended the season prematurely due to the coronavirus outbreak and crowned Žalgiris champions.

In the 2020–21 LKL season the LKL has reached a historic agreement - LKL will be broadcast in foreign countries for the first time since its establishment. During the 2020–21 LKL season, it was decided that in the next 2021–22 LKL season, 11 teams will participate in the tournament again after 6 years. BC Jonava joined the other 10 existing LKL teams by winning the 2020–21 NKL season. For the 2022–23 season, the number of teams was further increased to 12, with the addition of the 2021–22 NKL champions Gargždai-SC and the new team Wolves.

During 2022–23 LKL season it was announced that the new team 2022–23 NKL season runner-up Mažeikiai M Basket will join other existing teams in LKL. Mažeikiai M Basket will take place of Labas Gas because they finished in last place in 2022–23 LKL season and were relegated to NKL. However, later it was announced that Labas Gas declared bankruptcy and ceased all operations.

2023–24 LKL season started with 12 teams but on 25 January 2024 one of the LKL team Gargždai-SC declared bankruptcy and during the meeting on 29 January 2024, it was officially confirmed that the team would not play the remaining games of the season, meaning that only 11 teams left in 2023–24 LKL season.

== Teams ==
=== Current LKL teams ===
Lietuvos Krepšinio Lyga teams
Team	Location	Arena	Capacity	Coordinates	Founded	Joined LKL	Head coach
Gargždai	Gargždai	Gargždų Arena	1,000	55.7107°N 21.3833°E	2024	2025	(Lithuania) Paulius Malašauskas
Jonava Hipocredit	Jonava	Jonava Arena	2,200	55.0766°N 24.2735°E	1969	2021	(Lithuania) Steponas Babrauskas
Juventus	Utena	Utena Arena	2,000	55.5041°N 25.5914°E	1999	2009	(Lithuania) Laimonas Eglinskas
Lietkabelis	Panevėžys	Kalnapilio Arena	5,950	55.7333°N 24.3394°E	1964	2007	(Serbia) Nenad Čanak
Neptūnas	Klaipėda	Švyturys Arena	6,200	55.6874°N 21.152°E	1964	1993	(Lithuania) Gediminas Petrauskas
Nevėžis-Paskolų klubas	Kėdainiai	Kėdainiai Arena	2,200	55.2996°N 23.99°E	1992	2002	(Lithuania) Evaldas Beržininkaitis
Rytas	Vilnius	Active Vilnius Arena	2,500	54.716°N 25.279°E	1963	1993	(Lithuania) Nedas Pacevičius
Šiauliai	Šiauliai	Šiauliai Arena	5,700	55.9206°N 23.2823°E	1994		(Lithuania) Darius Songaila
Tauragė	Tauragė	Tauragė Arena	1,800	55.2576°N 22.3030°E	2015	2026	(Lithuania) Tomas Rinkevičius
Žalgiris	Kaunas	Žalgiris Arena	15,552	54.8903°N 23.915°E	1944	1993	(Lithuania) Tomas Masiulis

2026–27 LKL club locations

=== Teams that competed in the LKL ===
Currently competes in 2025–26 LKL season
Currently competes in 2025–26 NKL season
Teams that no longer exist

Team	Founded	Played in the LKL	Seasons
Alita Alytus	1995	1995–2005	10
Alytus	2005	2007–2011	4
Dzūkija Alytus	2012	2013–2022	9
Gargždai (old)	2014	2022–2024	2
Gargždai	2024	2025–present	n/a
Jonava	1999	2021–present	4
Žalgiris Kaunas	1944	1993–present	32
LSU–Atletas Kaunas	1995	2012–2014	2
Kauno Drobė	1938	1993–1994	1
Lavera Kaunas	1991	1993–1995	2
Atletas Kaunas	1962	1993–2007	14
NECA Kaunas	1990	1993–1995	2
Kaunas	2008	2008–2009	1
Baltai Kaunas	2007	2007–2012	5
Nevėžis Kėdainiai	1992	2002–present	23
Neptūnas Klaipėda	1964	1993–present	32
Kraitenė Marijampolė	1990	1998–2001	3
Sūduva Marijampolė	2006	2006–2010	4
Mažeikiai	2005	2014–2015; 2023–2025	3
Nafta Mažeikiai	1996	2001–2004	3
Palanga	2006	2010–2013	3
Lietkabelis Panevėžys	1964	1993–present	32
Pieno žvaigždės Pasvalys	1999	2011–2024	13
Olimpas Plungė	1989	1993–1998	5
Prienai	1994	2009–2023	14
Šiauliai	1984	1994–present	31
Šilutė	1990	1993–1999	6
Juventus Utena	1999	2009–present	16
Rytas Vilnius	1997	1997–present	28
Sakalai Vilnius	1991	1994–2013	19
Statyba Vilnius	1963	1993–1997	4
Perlas Vilnius	2003	2009–2011	2
Wolves	2022	2022–2025	3

== Champions by season ==
Classic LKL logo

- In 1994–95, 1995–96 and 1996–97 seasons no bronze medal game was played and positions were determined by regular season standings of the semifinalists.

Season	Champion	Runner-up	Bronze	Fourth place
1993–94	Žalgiris	Atletas	Statyba	Lavera
1994–95	Žalgiris	Atletas	Lavera	Šiauliai
1995–96	Žalgiris	Atletas	Olimpas	Sakalai
1996–97	Žalgiris	Olimpas	Šilutė	Šiauliai
1997–98	Žalgiris	Atletas	Lietuvos rytas	Sakalai
1998–99	Žalgiris	Lietuvos rytas	Sakalai	Šiauliai
1999–00	Lietuvos rytas	Žalgiris	Šiauliai	Sakalai
2000–01	Žalgiris	Lietuvos rytas	Šiauliai	Alita
2001–02	Lietuvos rytas	Žalgiris	Alita	Šiauliai
2002–03	Žalgiris	Lietuvos rytas	Alita	Šiauliai
2003–04	Žalgiris	Lietuvos rytas	Šiauliai	Sakalai
2004–05	Žalgiris	Lietuvos rytas	Šiauliai	Sakalai
2005–06	Lietuvos rytas	Žalgiris	Šiauliai	Nevėžis
2006–07	Žalgiris	Lietuvos rytas	Šiauliai	Neptūnas
2007–08	Žalgiris	Lietuvos rytas	Šiauliai	Alytus
2008–09	Lietuvos rytas	Žalgiris	Šiauliai	Neptūnas
2009–10	Lietuvos rytas	Žalgiris	Šiauliai	Juventus
2010–11	Žalgiris	Lietuvos rytas	Rūdupis	Juventus
2011–12	Žalgiris	Lietuvos rytas	Rūdupis	Šiauliai
2012–13	Žalgiris	Lietuvos rytas	Neptūnas	Prienai
2013–14	Žalgiris	Neptūnas	Lietuvos rytas	Prienai
2014–15	Žalgiris	Lietuvos rytas	Juventus	Neptūnas
2015–16	Žalgiris	Neptūnas	Lietuvos rytas	Juventus
2016–17	Žalgiris	Lietkabelis	Lietuvos rytas	Neptūnas
2017–18	Žalgiris	Lietuvos rytas	Neptūnas	Lietkabelis
2018–19	Žalgiris	Rytas	Neptūnas	Lietkabelis
2019–20	Žalgiris (Note: Žalgiris declared champion through regular season standings after the premature ending of the league due to the COVID-19 pandemic.)	Rytas	Lietkabelis	Neptūnas
2020–21	Žalgiris	Rytas	Lietkabelis	Juventus
2021–22	Rytas	Lietkabelis	Žalgiris	Šiauliai
2022–23	Žalgiris	Rytas	Lietkabelis	Jonava
2023–24	Rytas	Žalgiris	Lietkabelis	Wolves
2024–25	Žalgiris	Rytas	Lietkabelis	Jonava
2025–26	Žalgiris	Juventus	Neptūnas	Lietkabelis

== Performance by club ==
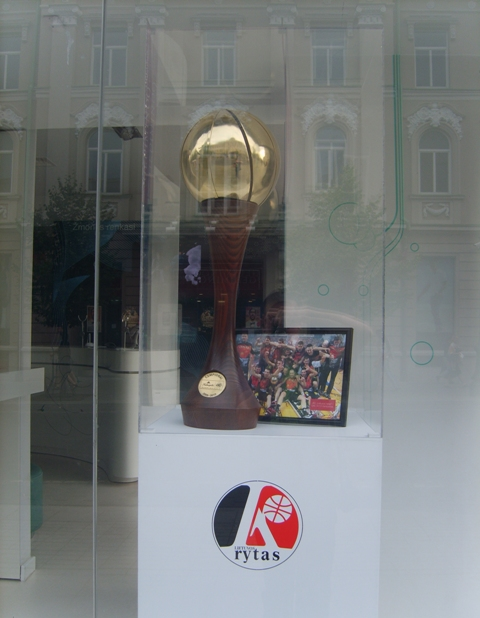
LKL trophy in Vilnius

Team	1st	2nd	3rd	4th	Winning years
Žalgiris	26	6	1	0	1993–94, 1994–95, 1995–96, 1996–97, 1997–98, 1998–99, 2000–01, 2002–03, 2003–04, 2004–05, 2006–07, 2007–08, 2010–11, 2011–12, 2012–13, 2013–14, 2014–15, 2015–16, 2016–17, 2017–18, 2018–19, 2019–20, 2020–21, 2022–23, 2024–25, 2025–26
Lietuvos rytas / Rytas	7	17	4	0	1999–2000, 2001–02, 2005–06, 2008–09, 2009–10, 2021–22, 2023–24
Atletas	0	4	0	0	
Lietkabelis	0	2	5	3	
Neptūnas	0	2	4	5	
Juventus	0	1	1	4	
Olimpas	0	1	1	0	
Šiauliai	0	0	9	7	
Rūdupis/Prienai	0	0	2	2	
Alita	0	0	2	1	
Sakalai	0	0	1	5	
Lavera	0	0	1	1	
Statyba	0	0	1	0	
Šilutė	0	0	1	0	
Jonava	0	0	0	2	
Alytus	0	0	0	1	
Nevėžis	0	0	0	1	
Wolves	0	0	0	1	

== Statistical leaders ==
Indicates player that still plays in the LKL

=== All-time scoring leaders ===
Players	Team(s) represented	Career seasons	Games played	Points
Mindaugas Lukauskis	Career clubs: Dzūkija/Wolves Alytus (2021-2023); Šiauliai (2020-2021); Skycop/Cbet Prienai (2018-2020); Lietkabelis Panevėžys (2016-2017); Lietuvos Rytas Vilnius (2014-2016); TonyBet Prienai (2013-2014); Lietuvos Rytas Vilnius (2003-2009); Dzūkija Alytus (2002-2003); Sakalai Vilnius (2001-2002); Kalnapilis/Sema/Panevėžys Panevėžys (1996-2001)	23	735	6217
Rolandas Matulis	Sakalai Vilnius	13	554	5649
Žydrūnas Urbonas	Career clubs: Juventus Utena (2009-2012); Alytus Alytus (2007-2009); Šiauliai (1999-2001; 2002-2005); Šilutė (1998-1999); Lietkabelis/Kalnapilis Panevėžys (1995-1998); Lavera Kaunas (1994-1995); Lietkabelis Panevėžys (1993-1994)	16	428	5575
Paulius Jankūnas	Žalgiris Kaunas	18	540	5252
Dainius Šalenga	Career clubs: Dzūkija Alytus (2017–2018); Juventus Utena (2016–2017); Vytautas Prienai (2015–2016); Lietkabelis Panevėžys (2014–2015); TonyBet Prienai (2013–2014); Rūdupis Prienai (2011–2012) ( Žalgiris Kaunas (2007–2011; 2000–2005); Sakalai Vilnius (1998–2000)	18	467	5214
Andrius Giedraitis	Career clubs: Lietuvos Rytas Vilnius (2003–2004; 1998–2001); Sakalai Vilnius (1994–1998)	8	243	5065
Virginijus Sirvydis	Career clubs: Panevėžys Panevėžys (2006–2007); Alita Alytus (2001–2002); Sakalai Vilnius (1999–2000); Statyba/Lietuvos Rytas Vilnius (1993–1999)	8	376	5035
Deividas Gailius	Career clubs: Gargždai (2025–present); Neptūnas Klaipėda (2021–2025; 2019–2020; 2014–2015; 2012–2013; 2007–2009); Lietuvos Rytas Vilnius (2015–2017); Šiauliai (2009–2010)	15	427	4912
Mindaugas Girdžiūnas	Career clubs: Neptūnas Klaipėda (2022–present; 2013–2017; 2009–2012); Lietuvos Rytas/Rytas Vilnius (2017–2022); Nevėžis Kėdainiai (2012–2013)	18	554	4911
Artūras Jomantas	Career clubs: M Basket–Delamode Mažeikiai (2023–2024); Dzūkija/Sintek–Dzūkija Alytus (2018–2022; 2014–2015); Lietuvos Rytas Vilnius (2016–2018; 2006–2013); Šiauliai (2015–2016; 2004–2006); Pieno žvaigždės Pasvalys (2013–2014); Nafta Mažeikiai (2001–2004)	23	576	4787

=== All-time rebounding leaders ===
Players	Team(s) represented	Career seasons	Games played	Rebounds
Rolandas Matulis	Sakalai Vilnius	13	554	3301
Paulius Jankūnas	Žalgiris Kaunas	18	540	2919
Artūras Jomantas	Career clubs: M Basket–Delamode Mažeikiai (2023–2024); Dzūkija/Sintek–Dzūkija Alytus (2018–2022; 2014–2015); Lietuvos Rytas Vilnius (2016–2018; 2006–2013); Šiauliai (2015–2016; 2004–2006); Pieno žvaigždės Pasvalys (2013–2014); Nafta Mažeikiai (2001–2004)	23	576	2695
Mindaugas Lukauskis	Career clubs: Dzūkija/Wolves Alytus (2021-2023); Šiauliai (2020-2021); Skycop/Cbet Prienai (2018-2020); Lietkabelis Panevėžys (2016-2017); Lietuvos Rytas Vilnius (2014-2016); TonyBet Prienai (2013-2014); Lietuvos Rytas Vilnius (2003-2009); Dzūkija Alytus (2002-2003); Sakalai Vilnius (2001-2002); Kalnapilis/Sema/Panevėžys Panevėžys (1996-2001)	23	735	2197
Egidijus Dimša	Career clubs: CBet/Vytautas Prienai (2020–2021; 2017–2018); Sintek–Dzūkija/Dzūkija Alytus (2018–2020); Pieno žvaigždės Pasvalys (2016–2017; 2013–2014); Juventus Utena (2015–2016); Lietkabelis Panevėžys (2015); Neptūnas Klaipėda (2014–2015); Triobet/Nevėžis Kėdainiai (2012; 2009–2011); Aisčiai/Aisčiai–Atletas Kaunas (2007–2009)	15	385	2119
Vaidas Čepukaitis	Career clubs: Wolves Alytus (2022); Dzūkija Alytus (2021–2022); Juventus Utena (2021; 2018–2019; 2016–2017; 2014–2015; 2010–2011); Nevėžis–OPTIBET Kėdainiai (2020–2021); CBet Prienai (2019–2020); Lietkabelis Panevėžys (2017–2018); Vytautas Prienai (2015–2016); TonyBet Prienai (2013–2014); Pieno žvaigždės Pasvalys (2012–2013); Baltai Kaunas (2011); Triobet/Aisčiai Kaunas (2008–2010)	16	433	2100
Žydrūnas Urbonas	Career clubs: Juventus Utena (2009-2012); Alytus Alytus (2007-2009); Šiauliai (1999-2001; 2002-2005); Šilutė (1998-1999); Lietkabelis/Kalnapilis Panevėžys (1995-1998); Lavera Kaunas (1994-1995); Lietkabelis Panevėžys (1993-1994)	16	428	2060
Erikas Kučiauskas	Career clubs: Sakalai Vilnius (2002–2007; 1994–1997); Preventa–Malsena/Panevėžys Panevėžys (2000–2002); Alita Alytus (1997–2000)	13	408	2007
Rolandas Vaičiūnas	Career clubs: Šiauliai (1998–2008); Statyba–Lietuvos Rytas/Statyba Vilnius (1993–1998)	15	423	1969
Arnas Butkevičius	Career clubs: Žalgiris Kaunas (2022–present); Lietuvos Rytas/Rytas Vilnius (2017–2022); Neptūnas Klaipėda (2013–2017); Lietkabelis Panevėžys (2012–2013); Sakalai Vilnius (2010–2012)	16	494	1962

=== All-time assists leaders ===
Players	Team(s) represented	Career seasons	Games played	Assists
Žygimantas Janavičius	Career clubs: Neptūnas Klaipėda (2019–2025); Skycop Prienai (2018–2019); Lietkabelis Panevėžys (2016–2017; 2014); Lietuvos Rytas Vilnius (2014–2016); Prienai/TonyBet Prienai (2012–2014); Baltai Kaunas (2011–2012); Šiauliai (2010–2011); Žalgiris Kaunas (2008–2010)	18	473	2095
Mindaugas Lukauskis	Career clubs: Dzūkija/Wolves Alytus (2021-2023); Šiauliai (2020-2021); Skycop/Cbet Prienai (2018-2020); Lietkabelis Panevėžys (2016-2017); Lietuvos Rytas Vilnius (2014-2016); TonyBet Prienai (2013-2014); Lietuvos Rytas Vilnius (2003-2009); Dzūkija Alytus (2002-2003); Sakalai Vilnius (2001-2002); Kalnapilis/Sema/Panevėžys Panevėžys (1996-2001)	23	735	1434
Robertas Giedraitis	Šiauliai	12	397	1351
Artūras Jomantas	Career clubs: M Basket–Delamode Mažeikiai (2023–2024); Dzūkija/Sintek–Dzūkija Alytus (2018–2022; 2014–2015); Lietuvos Rytas Vilnius (2016–2018; 2006–2013); Šiauliai (2015–2016; 2004–2006); Pieno žvaigždės Pasvalys (2013–2014); Nafta Mažeikiai (2001–2004)	23	576	1313
Mindaugas Girdžiūnas	Career clubs: Neptūnas Klaipėda (2022–present; 2013–2017; 2009–2012); Lietuvos Rytas/Rytas Vilnius (2017–2022); Nevėžis Kėdainiai (2012–2013)	18	554	1231
Donatas Sabeckis	Career clubs: Juventus Utena (2025–present); M Basket–Delamode Mažeikiai (2024–2025); 7bet–Lietkabelis Panevėžys (2023); Šiauliai–7bet/Šiauliai (2021–2023); CBet Prienai (2019–2020); Žalgiris Kaunas (2018); Šiauliai (2016–2018)	9	203	1137
Martynas Gecevičius	Career clubs: M Basket–Delamode Mažeikiai (2023–2024); Uniclub Casino Juventus/Juventus Utena (2020–2023); Skycop Prienai (2018–2019); Lietuvos Rytas Vilnius (2013–2015; 2007–2011); Sakalai Vilnius (2004–2007)	14	398	1091
Dovis Bičkauskis	Career clubs: 7bet–Lietkabelis/Lietkabelis Panevėžys (2023–present); CBet Jonava (2022–2023); Rytas Vilnius (2019–2021); Juventus Utena (2016–2019)	8	296	1078
Lukas Lekavičius	Žalgiris Kaunas	10	340	1076
Kristupas Žemaitis	Career clubs: Wolves Alytus/Wolves Twinsbet (2022–2025); Lietkabelis Panevėžys (2021–2022); Dzūkija Alytus (2020–2021); Nevėžis Kėdainiai (2019–2020); Šiauliai (2017–2019); Vytautas Prienai (2017)	9	285	1073

== See also ==
- List of Lithuanian basketball league champions
- King Mindaugas Cup
- King Mindaugas Cup MVP
- LKF Cup
- Basketball in Lithuania
