= BC Lavera =

Lavera Kaunas
- Leagues: Lietuvos krepšinio lyga
- Founded: 1991
- Dissolved: 1995
- History: BC Kelininkas (1991–1993); BC Lavera (1993–1995)
- Arena: Sports hall "Kausta"
- Capacity: 500
- Location: Kaunas, Lithuania
- Team colors: Orange, white and purple
- President: Gintaras Verpetinskas
- Head coach: Henrikas Giedraitis
Home

Basketball club Lavera (Lithuanian: Krepšinio klubas Lavera) was a basketball club located in Kaunas, Lithuania. It was founded in 1991 and participated in the first two seasons of the Lithuanian Basketball League. Despite the club's success, Lavera dissolved in 1995 due to financial issues.

== Season by season ==
Season	League	Pos.	Roster
1993–94	LKL	4th	Ramūnas Cvirka, Ramūnas Inokaitis, Rolandas Spudvilas, Dainius Staugaitis, Arūnas Rozenbergas, Tomas Pačėsas, Singaras Tribė, Rolandas Mačiulaitis, Andrius Vyšniauskas, Gediminas Meiliūnas, Nerijus Rimkevičius, Virginijus Praškevičius
1994–95	LKL	3rd	Ramūnas Cvirka, Dainius Staugaitis, Žydrūnas Urbonas, Gintaras Staniulis, Arūnas Rozenbergas, Tomas Pačėsas, Singaras Tribė, Erikas Bublys, Andrius Vyšniauskas, Gediminas Meiliūnas, Šarūnas Budrys, Virginijus Praškevičius

Detailed information of former rosters and results.
