= Robert Browning School =

Location
- 130 Browning Blvd. Winnipeg, Manitoba; Canada
- Coordinates: 49.87243°N 97.297282°W

Information
- School type: Public Elementary School
- School board: St. James-Assiniboia School Division
- Principal: Bonnie Neil
- Grades: Kindergarten-Grade 5
- Language: French Immersion
- Area: Westwood, Winnipeg
- Colours: Blue and Yellow
- Mascot: Arbie
- Website: robertbrowning.sjsd.net

Robert Browning School is a French-immersion public elementary school in Winnipeg, Manitoba, Canada.

Generally, students from this school passing to grade 6 attend École Ness (the only middle school in the St. James-Assiniboia School Division that has French immersion available) if wishing to continue with French immersion, otherwise they generally attend Lincoln Middle School which does not have French immersion.

== Academics ==
25% of the school day is English and at the grade 5 level, English Language Arts Divisional Test results of Robert Browning's students have consistently been above the Division mean.
