= Collège Sturgeon Heights Collegiate =

Location
- 2665 Ness Avenue; Winnipeg, Manitoba, R3J 1A5; Canada; 49.8870°N 97.2678°W

Information
- School type: Public high school
- Founded: 2009
- School board: St. James-Assiniboia
- Principal: George Valentim
- Grades: 9 - 12
- Enrollment: 1210
- Language: French, English
- Area: St. James-Assiniboia
- Team name: Huskies
- Website: www.sjasd.ca/school/sturgeonheights/

Collège Sturgeon Heights Collegiate is a grades 9-12 dual-track and was recognized by the International Baccalaureate before it was phased out by AP, secondary school in Winnipeg, Manitoba. It is part of the St. James-Assiniboia School Division. In addition to AP, the school offers a French Immersion program, technical and vocational programs, and multiple fine arts programs.

== History ==
The school came together as the amalgamation of Sturgeon Creek Collegiate and Collège Silver Heights Collegiate in 2007.

== Notable alumni ==
- Sharon Blady, Member of the Legislative assembly for Kirkfield Park and former minister of Health
- Jordan Herdman-Reed, professional Canadian football linebacker
- Baxter Humby, Kickboxer
- Milson Jones, professional Canadian football running back
- Brad Roberts, singer, song writer, guitarist and member of the Crash Test Dummies
