= BC Alytus =

- Founded: 2005
- Dissolved: 2011
- Arena: Alytus Arena (capacity: 5500)
- Location: Alytus, Lithuania
- Team colors: White and Green
- Website: bcalytus.lt
Home	Away

BC Alytus (Lithuanian: Krepšinio Klubas Alytus) is the historical basketball club of Alytus, Lithuania. It was founded in 2005, as a successor to BC Alita, and participated in the Lietuvos Krepšinio Lyga (Lithuanian Basketball League) and the Baltic Basketball League for a few seasons. In 2011 BC Alytus changed their name to BC Savanoris, playing in the third-tier RKL, and later becoming BC Dzūkija, was established in Alytus.

== Achievements ==
Year	League	Season	Play-Off	Baltic	Events	European	Events
2005–06	NKL	A-6	1/8	–	–	–	–
2006–07	NKL	B-1	1/4	–	–	–	–
2007–08	LKL	4th	4th	Challenge Cup	8th	–	–
2008–09	LKL	9th	–	Challenge Cup	9th	–	–
2009–10	LKL	11th	–	Challenge Cup	12th	–	–
2010–11	LKL	13th	Relegated	Challenge Cup	6th	–	–

== Notable players ==
- (Lithuania) Saulius Kazevičius
- (Lithuania) Nerijus Varnelis
- (Lithuania) Andrius Aleksandrovas
- (Lithuania) Mindaugas Jaruševičius
- (Lithuania) Žygimantas Janavičius
- (Lithuania) Tadas Klimavičius
- (Lithuania) Darjuš Lavrinovič
- (Lithuania) Kšyštof Lavrinovič
