= 1999 FIBA EuroLeague Final Four =

International basketball tournament

Tournament details
- Arena: Olympiahalle; Munich, Germany
- Dates: April 1999

Final positions
- Champions: (Lithuania) Žalgiris (1st title)
- Runners-up: (Italy) Kinder Bologna
- Third place: (Greece) Olympiacos
- Fourth place: (Italy) Teamsystem Bologna

Awards and statistics
- MVP: (United States) Tyus Edney

The 1999 FIBA EuroLeague Final Four was the 1998–99 season's FIBA EuroLeague Final Four tournament, organized by FIBA Europe.

Žalgiris won its first title after defeating Kinder Bologna in the final game.

== Bracket ==
Semi-finals
(Italy) Teamsystem Bologna	57
(Italy) Kinder Bologna	62
(Lithuania) Žalgiris	87
(Greece) Olympiacos	71

Final
(Italy) Kinder Bologna	74
(Lithuania) Žalgiris	82
Third place
(Italy) Teamsystem Bologna	63
(Greece) Olympiacos	74

== Semifinals ==
=== Teamsystem Bologna – Kinder Bologna ===
April 20
18:30

Boxscore

Teamsystem Bologna (Italy)	57–62	(Italy) Kinder Bologna
Scoring by half: 32–34, 25–28
Pts: Myers 18; Rebs: Betts 5 Asts: none		Pts: Nesterović 16; Rebs: Frosini 10; Asts: Danilović, Sconochini 3

Olympiahalle, Munich
Attendance: 11,500
Referees: Miguel Ángel Betancor (ESP), Iztok Rems (SLO)

=== Žalgiris – Olympiacos ===
April 20
21:00

Boxscore

Žalgiris (Lithuania)	87–71	(Greece) Olympiacos
Scoring by half: 48–33, 39–38
Pts: Bowie 19; Rebs: Zídek 5 Asts: Edney 6		Pts: Tarlać 15; Rebs: Tarlać 9 Asts: Tarlać 2

Olympiahalle, Munich
Attendance: 11,500
Referees: Reuven Virovnik (ISR), Carl Jungebrand (FIN)

== Third Place Game ==
April 22
18:30

Boxscore

Teamsystem Bologna (Italy)	63–74	(Greece) Olympiacos
Scoring by half: 28–43, 35–31
Pts: Jarić 17; Rebs: three players 4 Asts: Karnišovas, Pilutti 4		Pts: Komazec 13; Rebs: Oberto 8 Asts: Tomić 4

Olympiahalle, Munich
Referees: Reuven Virovnik (ISR), Miguel Ángel Betancor (ESP)

== Final ==
April 22
21:00

Boxscore

Kinder Bologna (Italy)	74–82	(Lithuania) Žalgiris
Scoring by half: 30–45, 44–37
Pts: Rigaudeau 27; Rebs: Nesterović 13; Asts: Nesterović, Sconochini 3		Pts: Bowie 17; Rebs: Edney, Zídek 6 Asts: Edney 6

Olympiahalle, Munich
Attendance: 9,000
Referees: Iztok Rems (SLO), Carl Jungebrand (FIN)

Kinder Bologna	Žalgiris

Starters:			P	R	A
PG	14	(France) Antoine Rigaudeau	27	2	1
SG	7	(Italy) Alessandro Abbio	8	5	2
SF	5	(Federal Republic of Yugoslavia) Saša Danilović (C)	7	1	1
PF	12	(Italy) Alessandro Frosini	5	3	0
C	8	(Slovenia) Rašo Nesterović	12	13	3
Reserves:			P	R	A
SG	6	(Italy) Claudio Crippa	0	0	0
SF	10	(Argentina) Hugo Sconochini	15	2	3
C	11	(Italy) Augusto Binelli	0	0	0
PF	13	(Republic of Ireland) Dan O'Sullivan	0	1	0
SF	15	(Italy) Matteo Panichi	DNP		
Head coach:
(Italy) Ettore Messina

1998–99 FIBA EuroLeague
Champions

Žalgiris
1st Title

Starters:			P	R	A
PG	4	(United States) Tyus Edney	14	6	6
SG	14	(United States) Anthony Bowie	17	1	0
SF	7	(Lithuania) Saulius Štombergas	12	2	3
PF	12	(Lithuania) Tomas Masiulis	4	4	1
C	9	(Lithuania) Eurelijus Žukauskas	4	1	1
Reserves:			P	R	A
PF	5	(Lithuania) Mindaugas Žukauskas	11	2	1
C	8	(Czech Republic) Jiří Zídek	12	6	1
SG	10	(Lithuania) Dainius Adomaitis	8	1	2
PG	13	(Lithuania) Darius Maskoliūnas (C)	0	0	0
SF	15	(Lithuania) Kęstutis Šeštokas	DNP		
Head coach:
(Lithuania) Jonas Kazlauskas

== Awards ==
=== FIBA EuroLeague Final Four MVP ===
- (United States) Tyus Edney ( (Lithuania) Žalgiris Kaunas)

=== FIBA EuroLeague Finals Top Scorer ===
- (France) Antoine Rigaudeau (Virtus Bologna)

=== FIBA EuroLeague All-Final Four Team ===
FIBA EuroLeague All-Final Four Team
Player	Team	Ref.
(United States) Tyus Edney (MVP)	Žalgiris Kaunas	
(United States) Anthony Bowie	Žalgiris Kaunas	
(Lithuania) Saulius Štombergas	Žalgiris Kaunas	
(Slovenia) / (Greece) Rašho Nesterović	Virtus Bologna	
(Lithuania) Eurelijus Žukauskas	Žalgiris Kaunas	
