= Darius Songaila =

Lithuanian basketball coach and former player (born 1978)

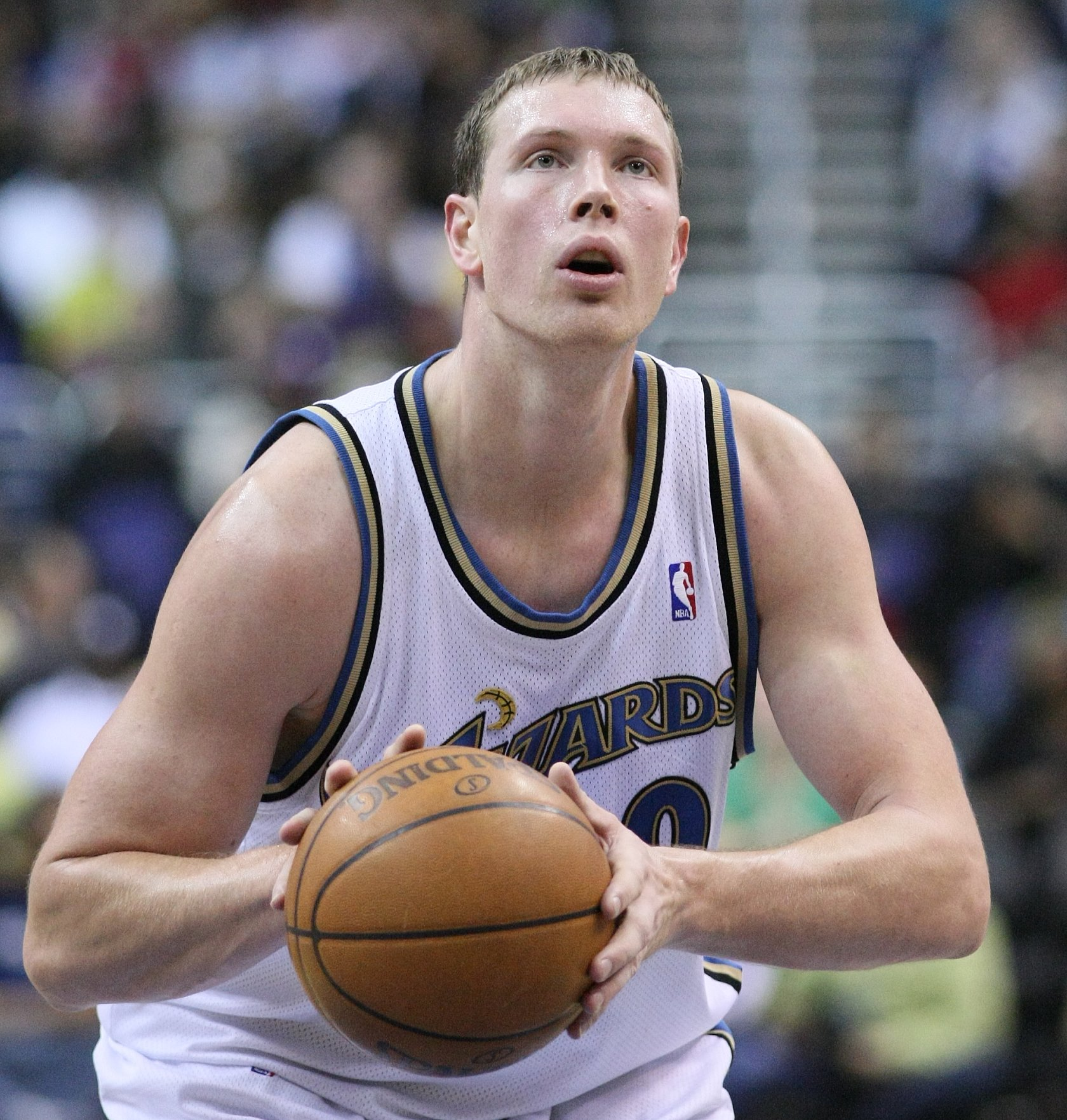
- Songaila playing for the Washington Wizards

BC Šiauliai
- Title: Head coach
- League: LKL; EuroCup

Personal information
- Born: February 14, 1978 (age 48) Kapsukas, Lithuanian SSR, Soviet Union
- Listed height: 6 ft 9 in (2.06 m)
- Listed weight: 248 lb (112 kg)

Career information
- High school: New Hampton School (New Hampton, New Hampshire)
- College: Wake Forest (1998–2002)
- NBA draft: 2002: 2nd round, 50th overall pick
- Drafted by: Boston Celtics
- Playing career: 2002–2015
- Position: Power forward / center
- Number: 25, 9
- Coaching career: 2015–present

Career history

Playing
- 2002–2003: CSKA Moscow
- 2003–2005: Sacramento Kings
- 2005–2006: Chicago Bulls
- 2006–2009: Washington Wizards
- 2009–2010: New Orleans Hornets
- 2010–2011: Philadelphia 76ers
- 2011–2012: Galatasaray
- 2012: Blancos de Rueda Valladolid
- 2012–2013: Donetsk
- 2013–2014: Lietuvos rytas Vilnius
- 2014–2015: Žalgiris Kaunas

Career highlights
- Russian champion (2003); Turkish Super Cup winner (2011); Lithuanian champion (2015); Lithuanian Federation Cup winner (2015); AP honorable mention All-American (2002); Second-team All-ACC (2002); Third-team All-ACC (2000); As assistant coach: 2× King Mindaugas Cup winner (2017, 2018); 3× Lithuanian champion (2016, 2017, 2018)

Career NBA statistics
- Points: 3,415 (6.9 ppg)
- Rebounds: 1,689 (3.4 rpg)
- Assists: 589 (1.2 apg)
- Stats at NBA.com
- Stats at Basketball Reference
Medals
Men's basketball
Representing Lithuania
Summer Olympic Games
Bronze medal – third place	2000 Sydney
EuroBasket
Gold medal – first place	2003 Sweden
Bronze medal – third place	2007 Spain
Head coach for Lithuania
FIBA U20 EuroBasket
Silver medal – second place	2025 Greece	Team

Darius Songaila (born February 14, 1978) is a Lithuanian professional basketball coach and former player who is the head coach for BC Šiauliai of the Lietuvos krepšinio lyga (LKL) and the EuroCup. He has represented the Lithuania national team. He played at the power forward and center positions.

== Early years ==
Songaila started his basketball career with Lietuvos rytas Marijampolė in second-tier Lithuanian league, the LKAL in 1995. In 1997, he moved to the United States where he attended the New Hampton School in New Hampton, New Hampshire. Songaila played the Nike Hoop Summit in 1998. He was also named to the All-European Under-22 Championship Second Team.

== College career ==
Darius Songaila played college basketball at Wake Forest University. He was named Third Team All-ACC in 2000 and Second Team All-ACC in 2002. He was also named Honorable Mention All-American by the Associated Press as a senior.

== Professional career ==
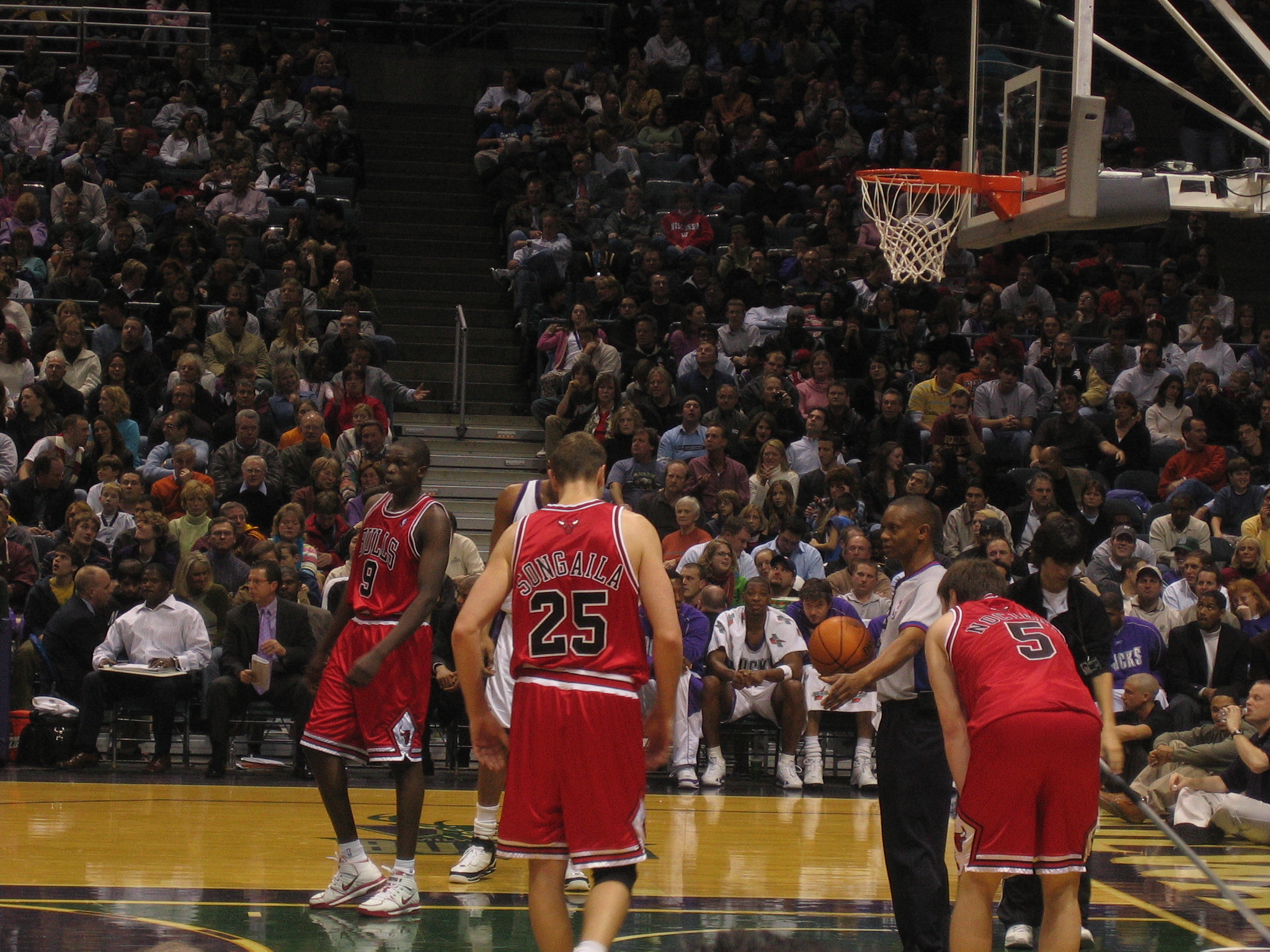
Songaila playing for the Chicago Bulls

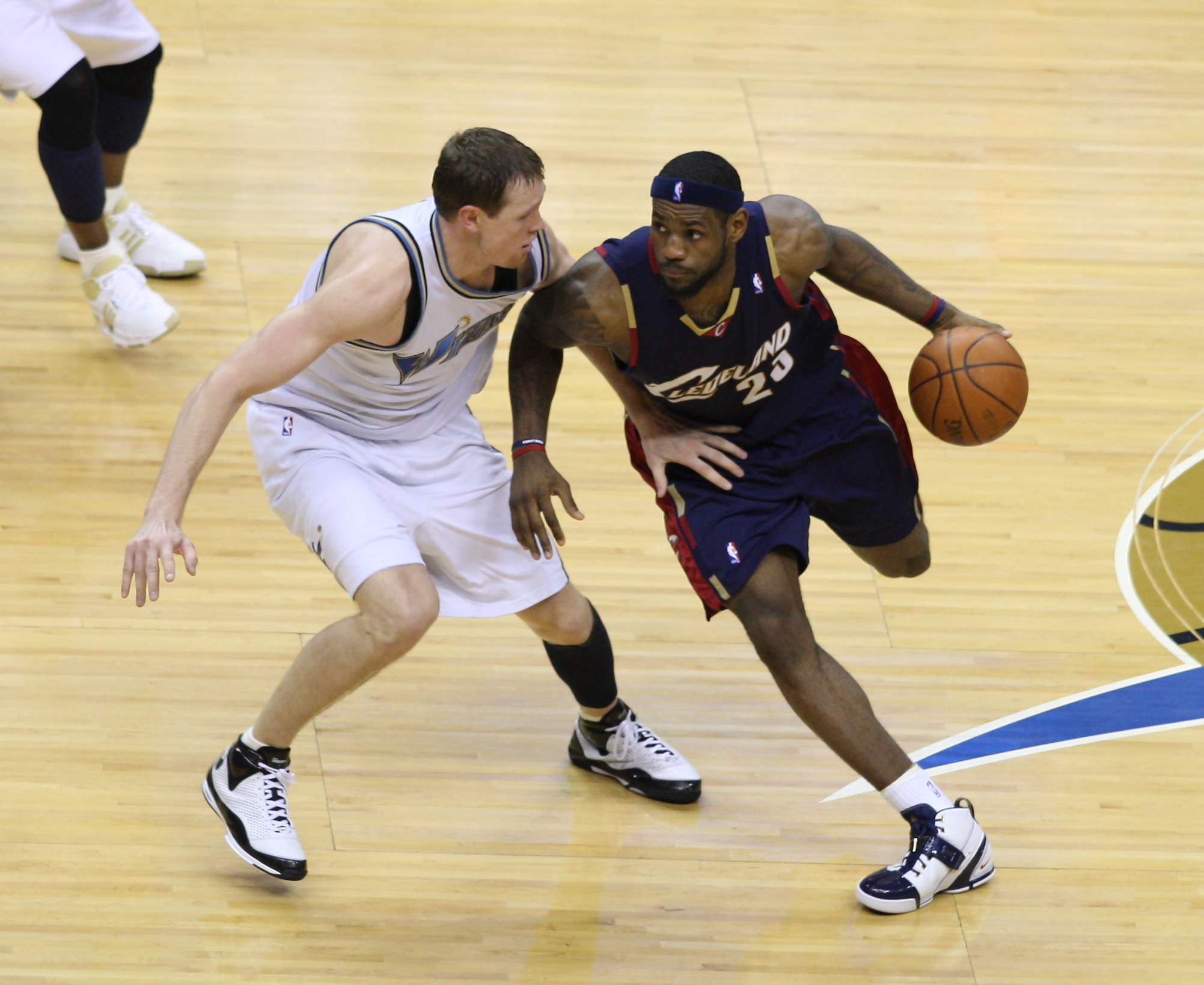
Songaila defending LeBron James

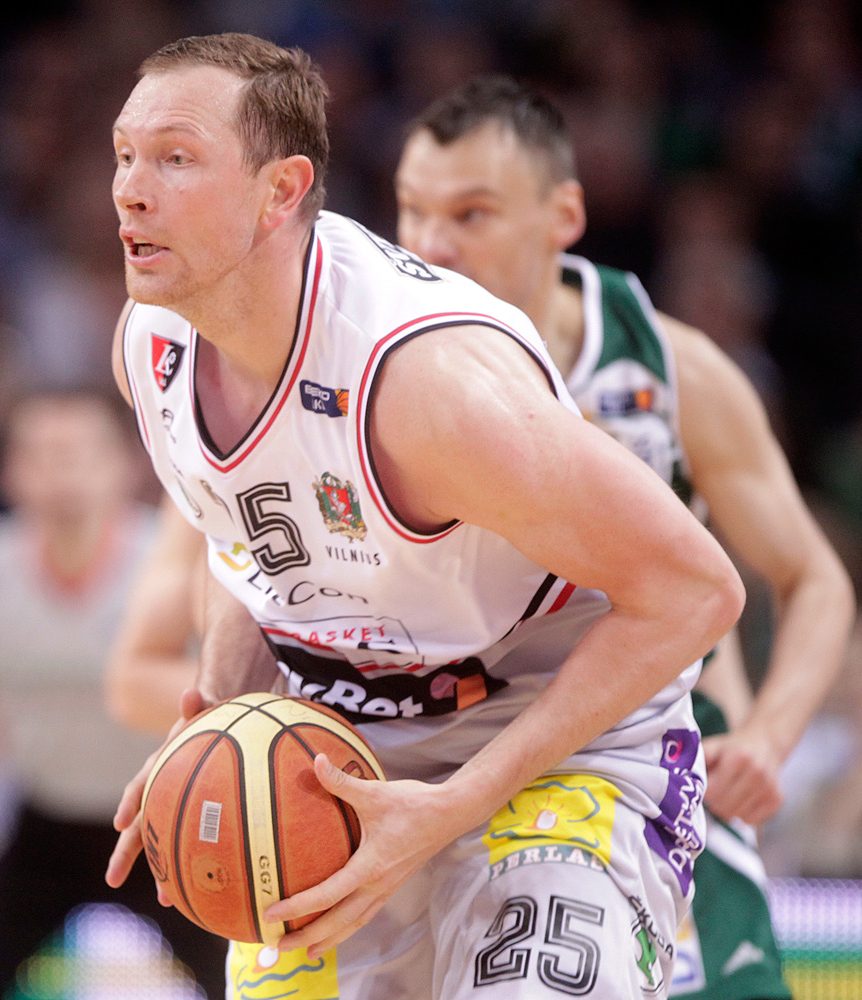
Songaila playing for Lietuvos rytas Vilnius

Songaila was selected with the 50th pick of the 2002 NBA draft by the Boston Celtics, who eventually dealt his rights to the Sacramento Kings.

He joined CSKA Moscow for the 2002–03 season and won the Russian Basketball Super League. He signed with the Kings in June 2003, and averaged 6.1 points and 3.7 rebounds in 154 games (28 starts) over two seasons.

Songaila signed a one-year deal with the Chicago Bulls in September 2005. He had his most successful season yet with the Bulls, averaging 9.2 points and 4.0 rebounds in 62 games (7 starts). However, he suffered an ankle injury in March 2006 and missed the final 20 games.

On July 17, 2006, Songaila signed with the Washington Wizards. The deal reportedly was worth $23 million over five years. He missed the first 45 games after a surgery for a herniated disc and averaged 7.6 points and 3.6 rebounds in 37 games (1 start).

Songaila eventually became a big part of the Wizards' bench and an occasional starter. He averaged 6.2 points and 3.4 rebounds in 2007–08. At the end of the 2008–09 season, Songaila became a starter because of the injuries suffered by teammates Brendan Haywood and Andray Blatche. He started a career-high 29 games and averaged 7.4 points and 2.9 rebounds.

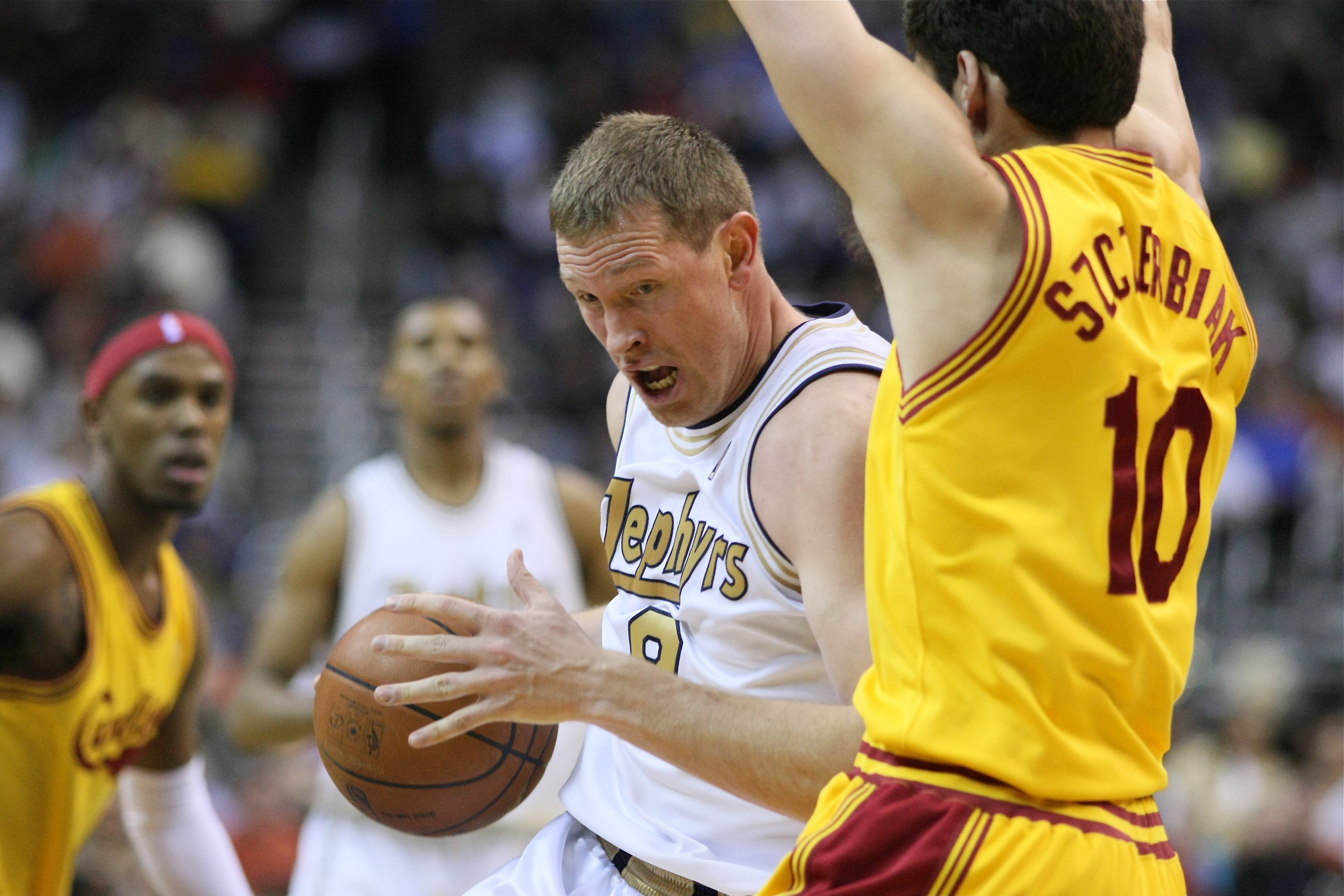
Songalia being defended by Wally Szczerbiak

On June 23, 2009, he was traded to the Minnesota Timberwolves along with Oleksiy Pecherov, Etan Thomas, and a first-round draft pick for Randy Foye and Mike Miller.

On September 9, 2009, he was traded to the New Orleans Hornets along with Bobby Brown in exchange for Antonio Daniels and a 2014 second round pick.

On September 23, 2010, he was traded to the Philadelphia 76ers along with rookie forward Craig Brackins in exchange for Willie Green and Jason Smith. Songaila had career lows with the 76ers, notably in points (1.6 ppg). With the 2010–11 season coming to an end, he became an unrestricted free agent.

In July 2011, he signed a one-year contract with Galatasaray in Turkey worth $1.5 million.

In March 2012, several weeks after leaving Galatasaray, Songaila signed with Blancos de Rueda Valladolid. Later that year, he signed with BC Donetsk.

On October 8, 2013, he signed with Lietuvos rytas Vilnius for one season. On July 22, 2014, he signed a one-year deal with Žalgiris Kaunas.

At the end of the 2014–15 season, he retired from the professional basketball.

== Coaching career ==
Songaila with Žalgiris Kaunas in 2018

On August 5, 2015, Songaila was appointed as an assistant coach for Žalgiris Kaunas.

In August 2018, he became a quality assurance assistant in the video department for the San Antonio Spurs of the National Basketball Association (NBA). In September 2019, Songaila was promoted to a player development assistant. In November 2020, Songaila was promoted to assistant coach.

On November 1, 2024, he signed with Manisa Basket of Basketbol Süper Ligi (BSL), as an assistant coach to Kazys Maksvytis.

In 2025, Songaila was the head coach of the Lithuania under-20 team that won silver medals in the 2025 FIBA U20 EuroBasket.

In July 2025, Songaila signed a one-season contract with BC Šiauliai of the Lithuanian Basketball League and for the first time in his career became the head coach of a professional club. On 16 March 2026, Songaila extended his contract with BC Šiauliai until the end of the 2026–2027 season.

== Career statistics ==
=== NBA ===
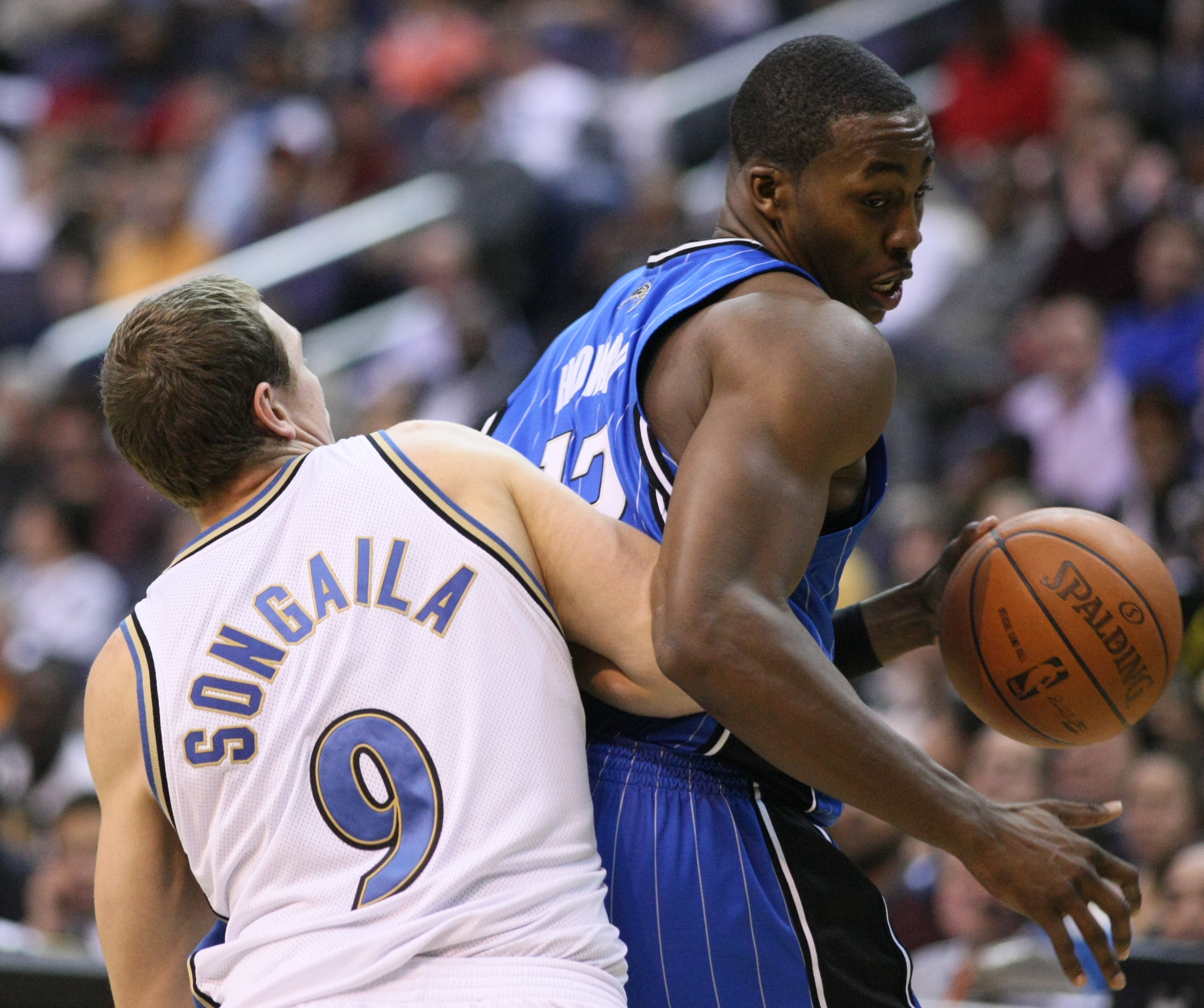
Songaila defending Dwight Howard

==== Regular season ====
Year	Team	GP	GS	MPG	FG%	3P%	FT%	RPG	APG	SPG	BPG	PPG
2003–04	Sacramento	73	7	13.4	.487	.000	.807	3.1	.7	.6	.2	4.6
2004–05	Sacramento	**81**	21	20.6	.527	.000	.847	**4.2**	1.4	.6	.2	7.5
2005–06	Chicago	62	7	**21.4**	.481	**.400**	.817	4.0	1.4	.6	**.3**	**9.2**
2006–07	Washington	37	1	18.9	.524	.000	.852	3.6	1.0	.5	**.3**	7.6
2007–08	Washington	80	13	19.4	.458	.000	**.918**	3.4	**1.7**	.7	.2	6.2
2008–09	Washington	77	**29**	19.8	**.532**	.000	.889	2.9	1.2	**.8**	**.3**	7.4
2009–10	New Orleans	75	1	18.8	.494	.167	.811	3.1	.9	**.8**	.2	7.2
2010–11	Philadelphia	10	0	7.1	.467	.000	.500	1.0	0.2	.0	.0	1.6
Career		495	79	18.6	.499	.158	.844	3.4	1.2	.7	.2	6.9

==== Playoffs ====
Year	Team	GP	GS	MPG	FG%	3P%	FT%	RPG	APG	SPG	BPG	PPG
2004	Sacramento	**7**	0	12.1	**.625**	.000	**1.000**	1.9	.3	.0	.1	3.7
2005	Sacramento	5	0	15.0	.421	.000	.800	2.8	.6	.4	**.2**	4.0
2007	Washington	4	0	**22.5**	.488	.000	**1.000**	**3.3**	**1.0**	**.8**	.0	**10.8**
2008	Washington	5	0	15.4	.421	.000	.867	2.6	.8	.2	.0	5.8
Career		21	0	15.6	.484	.000	.897	2.5	.6	.3	.1	5.6

=== EuroLeague ===
Legend
GP	Games played	GS	Games started	MPG	Minutes per game
FG%	Field-goal percentage	3P%	3-point field-goal percentage	FT%	Free-throw percentage
RPG	Rebounds per game	APG	Assists per game	SPG	Steals per game
BPG	Blocks per game	PPG	Points per game	PIR	Performance index rating
**Bold**	Career high

Year	Team	GP	GS	MPG	FG%	3P%	FT%	RPG	APG	SPG	BPG	PPG	PIR
2002–03	CSKA Moscow	18	**16**	21.6	.475	**.286**	**.847**	3.9	1.1	.6	**.2**	**12.8**	**10.8**
2011–12	Galatasaray	10	10	15.3	.455	.000	.714	2.8	.4	.4	.0	6.5	3.3
2013–14	Lietuvos rytas	10	8	**21.9**	.473	.000	.667	**4.8**	**1.3**	**.7**	.1	8.2	8.0
2014–15	Žalgiris	**24**	2	14.5	**.492**	.000	.778	2.5	.9	.6	.1	5.8	4.5
Career		62	36	17.8	.477	.286	.794	3.3	1.0	.6	.1	8.3	6.7

== State awards ==
- Lithuania: Recipient of the Commander's Cross of the Order of the Lithuanian Grand Duke Gediminas (2001)
- Lithuania: Recipient of the Commander's Grand Cross of the Order for Merits to Lithuania (2003)
- Lithuania: Recipient of the Commander's Grand Cross of the Order of the Lithuanian Grand Duke Gediminas (2007)

== Personal life ==
In May 2026, Songaila was involved in a violet incident. He was walking his family's small dog when a large dog attacked. The owner of the large dog allegedly appeared and struck Songaila with a heavy dog leash chain. The chain hit him in the face, cutting his nose and head and chipped one of his teeth.

== See also ==
- List of European basketball players in the United States
