= Dainius Adomaitis =

Lithuanian basketball player and coach

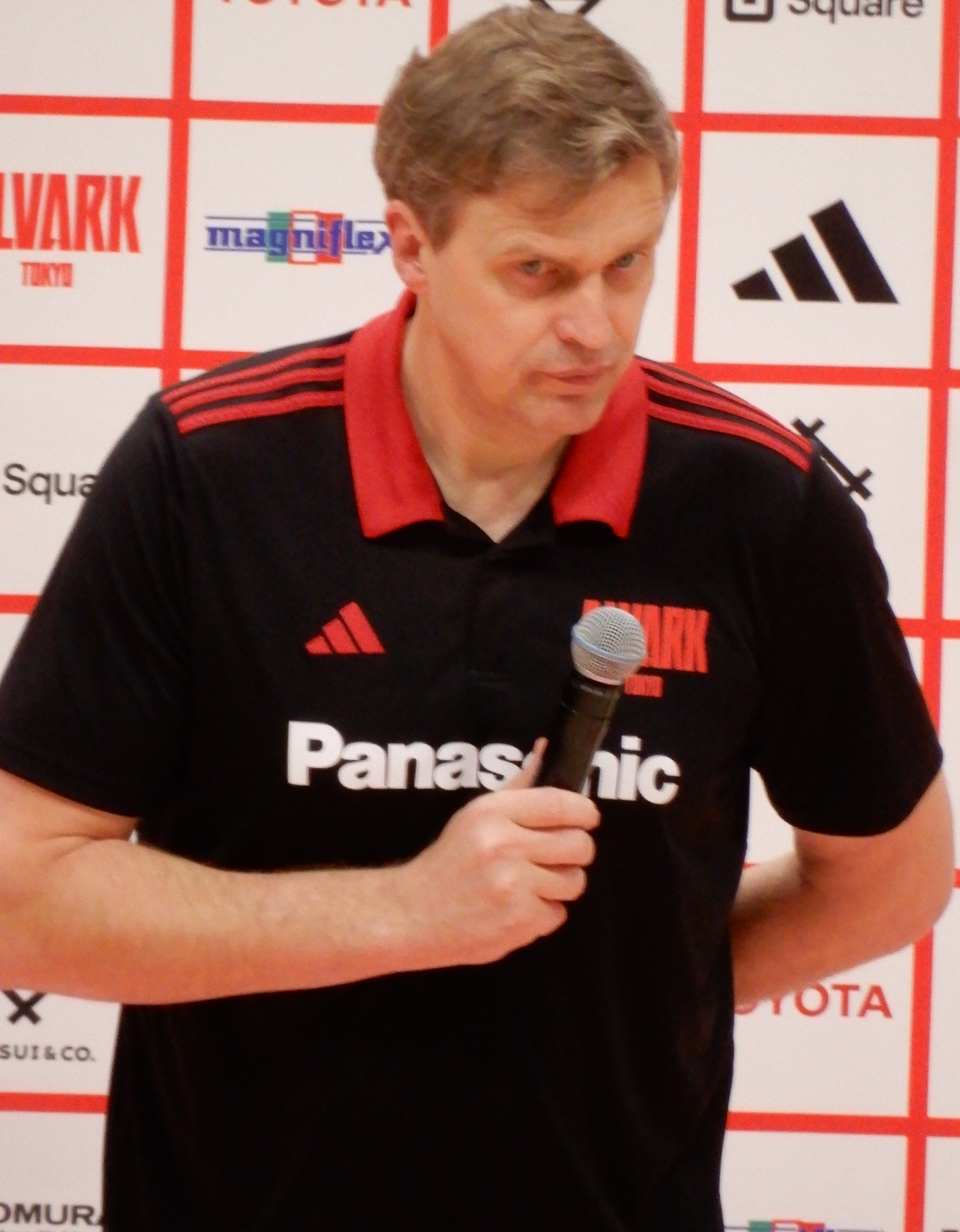
- Adomaitis in January 2024

Lithuania
- Title: Head coach

Personal information
- Born: 19 January 1974 (age 52) Šakiai, Lithuanian SSR, Soviet Union
- Listed height: 2.01 m (6 ft 7 in)
- Listed weight: 98 kg (216 lb)

Career information
- NBA draft: 1996: undrafted
- Playing career: 1993–2009
- Position: Small forward
- Coaching career: 2009–present

Career history

Playing
- 1993–1996: Statyba Vilnius
- 1996–1999: Žalgiris Kaunas
- 1999: Zucchetti Montecatini
- 1999–2000: Anwil Włocławek
- 2000–2003: Śląsk Wrocław
- 2003–2007: BCM Gravelines
- 2007–2009: Barons/LMT Riga

Coaching
- 2009–2010: Czarni Słupsk (assistant)
- 2010–2012: Czarni Słupsk
- 2012: Anwil Włocławek
- 2012–2013: Lietuvos rytas Vilnius (assistant)
- 2013–2014: Lietuvos rytas Vilnius
- 2014–2015: Juventus Utena
- 2015–2017: Neptūnas Klaipėda
- 2016–2019: Lithuania
- 2018–2020: Rytas Vilnius
- 2021: Hapoel Jerusalem
- 2021–2022: Neptūnas Klaipėda
- 2022–2026: Alvark Tokyo
- 2026–present: Lithuania

Career highlights
- As player: EuroLeague champion (1999); FIBA EuroCup champion (1998); 3× Lithuanian LKL champion (1997–1999); 2× Polish League champion (2001, 2002); North European League champion (1999); French Cup winner (2005); Latvian League champion (2008); FIBA EuroCup winner (2008); As head coach: 2× LKL Coach of the Year (2015, 2016); Lithuanian King Mindaugas Cup winner (2019)
Medals
Men's basketball
Representing Lithuania
Olympic Games
Bronze medal – third place	2000 Sydney

Dainius Adomaitis (born 19 January 1974) is a Lithuanian professional basketball coach and former player. He is currently head coach of the Lithuanian national team. As a player, Adomaitis won the EuroLeague in 1999 with Žalgiris.

== Professional career ==
He started his career in Statyba Vilnius. Later he moved to Žalgiris Kaunas and became champion of the EuroLeague. After the successful season in Žalgiris Kaunas he moved to Zucchetti Montecatini, but he did not fit there. Therefore, he moved to Anwil Włocławek, and later to Śląsk Wrocław and finally in 2003 he arrived to BCM Gravelines. He became the captain of this team just a year later. Nevertheless, at the end of 2006–2007 season during the change of coaches, he left to Barons/LMT Riga. In August 2009 he announced the end of his career.

== National team career ==
Adomaitis was a member of the Lithuanian national team, which won the bronze medal at the 2000 Olympic Games.

== Coaching career ==
On 22 August 2009 he was named an assistant coach of the Polish team Czarni Słupsk. On 23 March 2010 he was promoted to be the head coach of the team.

In June 2012, he signed a contract with Anwil Włocławek to be the head coach, but he was fired the same year because of bad team results. On 19 November 2012 he joined the Lithuanian team Lietuvos rytas Vilnius as assistant coach of head coach Darius Maskoliūnas. After shortly performing as the head coach of Lietuvos rytas, he joined Juventus Utena and was named best coach of the 2014–15 LKL season.

In 2015, he joined Neptūnas and was once again named best coach of the LKL season after coaching Neptūnas to the LKL finals.

On 21 June 2018 Adomaitis was hired as head coach by Rytas Vilnius of the Lithuanian Basketball League. On 2 June 2020 Adomaitis and Rytas Vilnius agreed to mutually part ways after both sides could not agree on a contract extension.

On 14 January 2021 Adomaitis signed as head coach with Hapoel Jerusalem of the Israeli Basketball Premier League. On 9 April 2021, he parted ways with the club.

On 18 December 2021 Adomatis signed with Neptūnas Klaipėda for the rest of the season.

On 1 July 2022 it was announced that Adomaitis signed with Alvark Tokyo which competes in Japan's B.League. In June 2026, he parted ways with the club after four seasons.

=== Lithuanian national team (2016–2019) ===
On 25 October 2016 Adomaitis was appointed as head coach for the Lithuanian national basketball team, following the departure of Jonas Kazlauskas shortly after the 2016 Rio Olympics. He left the Lithuanian national team after the 2019 FIBA Basketball World Cup, where the Lithuanian team was eliminated from the quarterfinals.

== Career statistics ==
Legend
GP	Games played	GS	Games started	MPG	Minutes per game
FG%	Field-goal percentage	3P%	3-point field-goal percentage	FT%	Free-throw percentage
RPG	Rebounds per game	APG	Assists per game	SPG	Steals per game
BPG	Blocks per game	PPG	Points per game	PIR	Performance index rating
**Bold**	Career high

=== EuroLeague ===
Year	Team	GP	GS	MPG	FG%	3P%	FT%	RPG	APG	SPG	BPG	PPG	PIR
2001–02	Śląsk Wrocław	14	**9**	**30.4**	**.505**	.475	.692	**4.1**	**1.4**	.4	**.2**	**10.8**	**9.9**
2002–03	Śląsk Wrocław	14	8	28.4	.468	**.533**	**.833**	3.4	1.3	**.9**	.1	8.2	9.6
Career		28	17	29.3	.489	.500	.744	3.8	1.4	.6	.2	9.5	9.7
