= Lithuanian Basketball Cup =

Lithuanian Basketball Cup may refer to:

- LKF Cup - Lithuanian professional men's basketball national cup tournament (1989–1990, 1997–1998, 2007–2015)
- Karaliaus Mindaugo taurė (English: King Mindaugas Cup) - Lithuanian professional men's basketball national cup tournament (2015–present)
