= Darius Maskoliūnas =

Lithuanian basketball player and coach

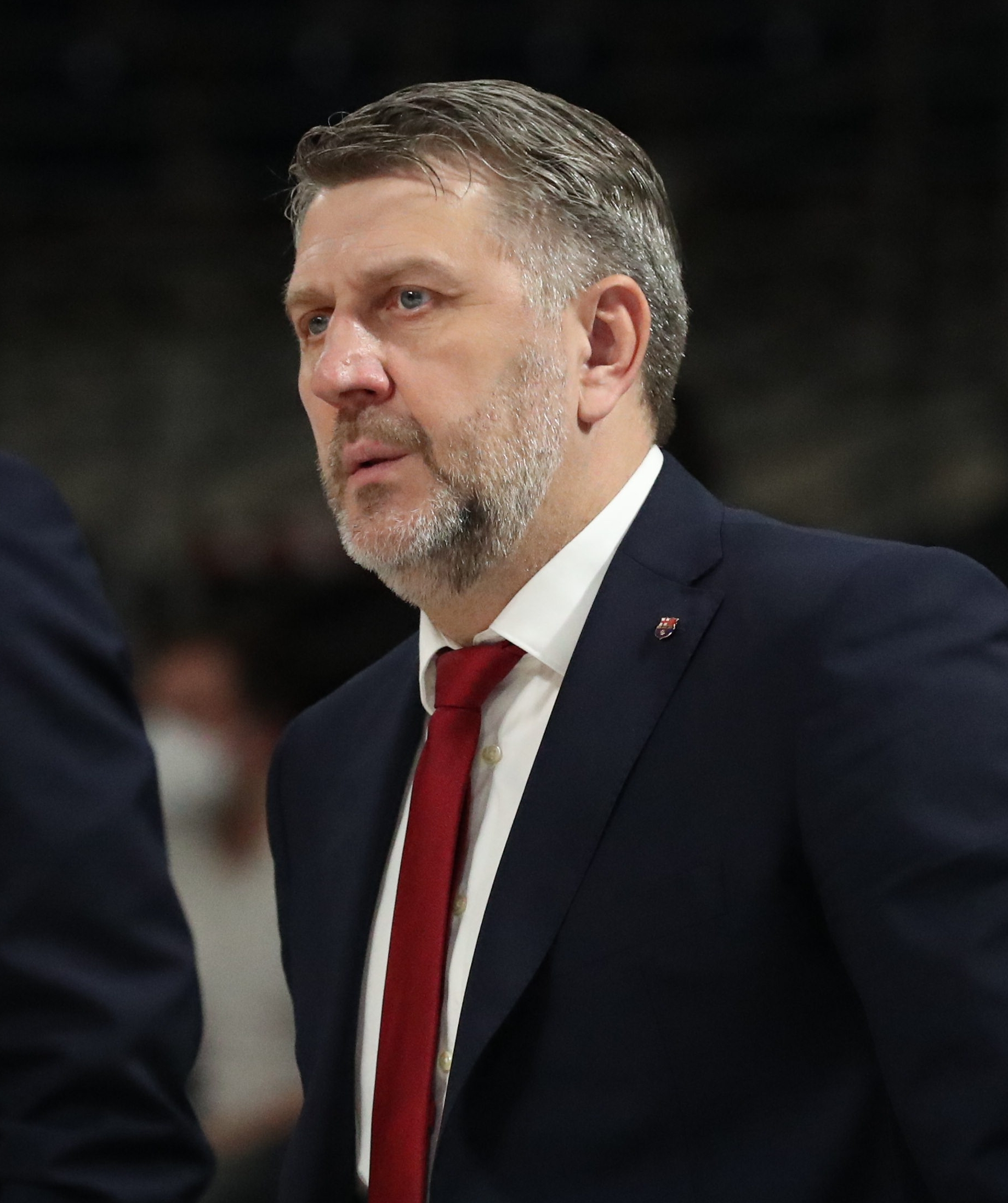
- Maskoliūnas in 2022

Personal information
- Born: 6 January 1971 (age 55) Jonava, Lithuanian SSR, Soviet Union
- Listed height: 6 ft 5 in (1.96 m)
- Listed weight: 198 lb (90 kg)

Career information
- College: Mykolas Romeris University
- Playing career: 1992–2005
- Position: Point guard
- Coaching career: 2007–present

Career history

Playing
- 1992–1999: Žalgiris Kaunas
- 1999–2003: Prokom Trefl Sopot
- 2003: Ilysiakos
- 2003–2005: Prokom Trefl Sopot

Coaching
- 2007–2009: Žalgiris Kaunas (assistant)
- 2009–2010: Žalgiris Kaunas
- 2010: KK Kaunas
- 2010–2011: Lietuvos rytas Vilnius (assistant)
- 2011: Lietuvos rytas Vilnius
- 2011–2012: Lietuvos rytas Vilnius (assistant)
- 2012–2013: Lietuvos rytas Vilnius
- 2013–2015: Trefl Sopot
- 2015–2020: Žalgiris Kaunas (assistant)
- 2019–2021: Lithuania
- 2020–2022: FC Barcelona (assistant)

Career highlights
- As a player: EuroLeague champion (1999); FIBA European Cup champion (1998); 7× Lithuanian Champion: (1993–1999); 2× Polish Cup winner (2000, 2001); Polish Supercup winner (2001); 2× Polish League champion (2004, 2005); North European League champion (1999); As head coach: Baltic League champion (2010); As assistant coach: 2× Spanish Cup winner (2021, 2022); Liga ACB champion (2021); 6× Lithuanian League champion (2008, 2016–2020); 3× King Mindaugas Cup winner (2017, 2018, 2020); Lithuanian Cup champion (2008)
Medals
Men's basketball
Representing Lithuania
Summer Olympics
Bronze medal – third place	2000 Sydney

Darius Maskoliūnas (born 6 January 1971) is a Lithuanian professional basketball coach, former player, and politician.

== Early life ==
Maskoliūnas graduated from the first secondary school, in Jonava.

== Professional career ==
During his pro club playing career, Maskoliūnas won the championship of Europe's secondary level competition, the FIBA European Cup (FIBA Saporta Cup), in the 1997-98 season), and the championship of Europe's primary level competition, the EuroLeague, in the 1998-99 season. He won both championships while a member of the Lithuanian League (LKL) club Žalgiris Kaunas.

== National team career ==
Maskoliūnas was a member of the senior Lithuania men's national basketball team that won the bronze medal at the 2000 Summer Olympic Games. With Lithuania, he also played at the 1997 EuroBasket, the 1998 FIBA World Cup, and the 1999 EuroBasket.

In November 2019, Maskoliūnas was appointed as the head coach of the senior Lithuania men's national basketball team, however following Lithuania's 85–96 loss to the Slovenia national team, led by Luka Dončić, in the final of the 2020 FIBA Men's Olympic Qualifying Tournament in Kaunas, Lithuania he resigned in July 2021.

== Coaching career ==
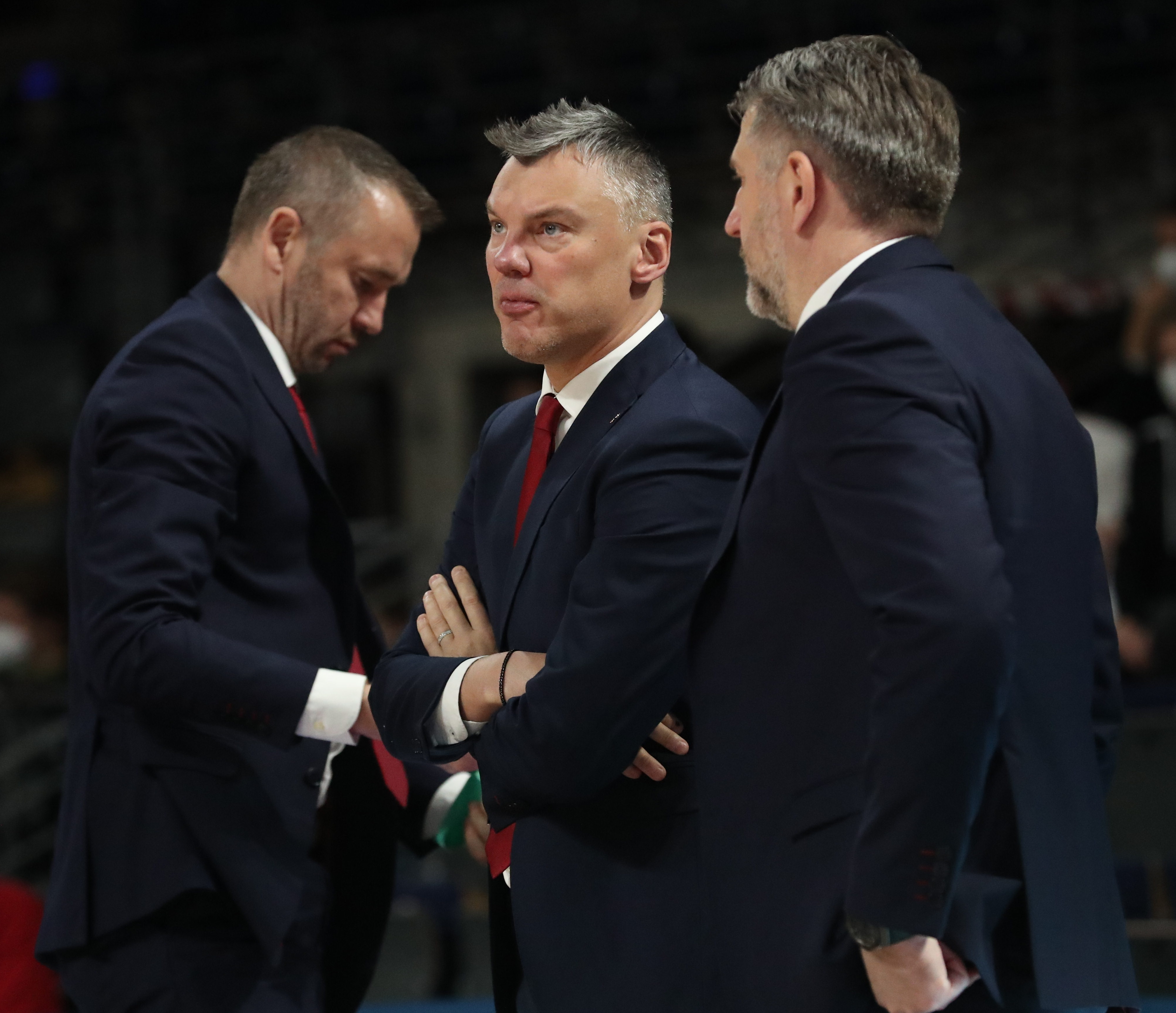
Maskoliūnas with head coach Šarūnas Jasikevičius and another assistant coach Tomas Masiulis coaching FC Barcelona in 2022

After his basketball playing career ended, Maskoliūnas started a career working as a basketball coach. During his coaching career, Maskoliūnas has been the head coach of the Lithuanian League (LKL) club Žalgiris Kaunas. While at Žalgiris, he was replaced under controversy, as he was fired during the 2010 LKL Finals series, by the club's then owner, Vladimir Romanov.

He has also worked as both an assistant and head coach with Žalgiris Kaunas' arch-rivals, Lietuvos rytas Vilnius. He signed with Lietuvos rytas Vilnius the next season, and worked in the club first as an assistant; but he became the club's head coach in April 2011, after its then head coach Aleksandar Trifunović was fired. After the season, he once again became an assistant, that time to Aleksandar Džikić. In October 2012, after Džikić was fired, he became the team's head coach again, but he was then shockingly fired by Lietuvos rytas Vilnius in March 2013.

In 2015–2020, Maskoliūnas worked as an assistant coach of Žalgiris Kaunas. In 2020, he together with Žalgiris' former head coach Šarūnas Jasikevičius departed to the FC Barcelona Bàsquet and worked as an assistant coach of Jasikevičius until the end of the 2021–2022 season.

== Awards and accomplishments ==
=== State awards ===
- Lithuania: Recipient of the Officer's Cross of the Order of the Lithuanian Grand Duke Gediminas (1999)
- Lithuania: Recipient of the Commander's Cross of the Order of the Lithuanian Grand Duke Gediminas (2001)

=== Club playing career ===
- 7× Lithuanian Champion: (1993, 1994, 1995, 1996, 1997, 1998, 1999)
- FIBA European Cup (FIBA Saporta Cup) Champion: (1998)
- North European League (NEBL) Champion: (1999)
- EuroLeague Champion: (1999)
- 2× Polish Cup Winner: (2000, 2001)
- Polish Supercup Winner: (2001)
- 2× Polish League (PLK) Champion: (2004, 2005)

=== Lithuanian senior national team ===
- 2000 Summer Olympic Games: Bronze

=== Coaching career ===
==== Assistant coach ====
- 4× Lithuanian League (LKL) Champion: (2008, 2016, 2017, 2018)
- 2× Lithuanian King Mindaugas Cup Winner: (2017, 2018)
- EuroBasket 2013: Silver
- EuroBasket 2015: Silver

==== Head coach ====
- Baltic League (BBL) Champion: (2010)

== Personal life ==
Darius Maskoliūnas has an old nickname "Švarcas", which he gained during his tenure with Kaunas Žalgiris as a player. When he joined Žalgiris, he was an extremely skinny point guard, and due to his second name Maskoliūnas, which is a little bit similar to the English word "Muscles", he got the nickname of "Švarcas" (Arnold Schwarzenegger). More recently, a growing number of online Lithuanian basketball community members have dubbed him ‘’makaluotojas’’ (Eng. one who beats or does something hurriedly, usually without much regard to quality) after his use of the word in an exhibition game to encourage his players to beat defenders with trick moves.

In 2010, Maskoliūnas graduated from the Faculty of Politics and Management of Mykolas Romeris University.
