= Alvydas Pazdrazdis =

Lithuanian basketball player (born 1972)

New York Knicks
- Title: Scout
- League: NBA

Personal information
- Born: 20 July 1972 (age 54) Kretinga, Lithuanian SSR, Soviet Union
- Listed height: 6 ft 5 in (1.96 m)
- Listed weight: 209 lb (95 kg)

Career information
- College: McNeese State (1993–1997)
- NBA draft: 1997: undrafted
- Playing career: 1991–2000
- Position: Small forward

Career history
- 1991–1992: Statyba Vilnius
- 1997–1999: Neptūnas Klaipėda
- 1999–2000: Sakalai Vilnius
Medals
Men's basketball
Representing Lithuania
Olympic Games
Bronze medal – third place	1992 Barcelona	Team competition

Alvydas Pazdrazdis (born 20 July 1972) is a Lithuanian former basketball player from Kretinga, Lithuania, who won the bronze medal with the Lithuania national basketball team at the 1992 Summer Olympics. He is currently a scout for the New York Knicks. His former clubs include Statyba Vilnius, Neptūnas Klaipėda and Sakalai Vilnius. He retired as a player at the age of 28. In June 2011, he became an NBA champion as a scout with the New York Knicks. He played collegiately at McNeese State University.
