= Jonas Kazlauskas =

Lithuanian professional basketball coach and player

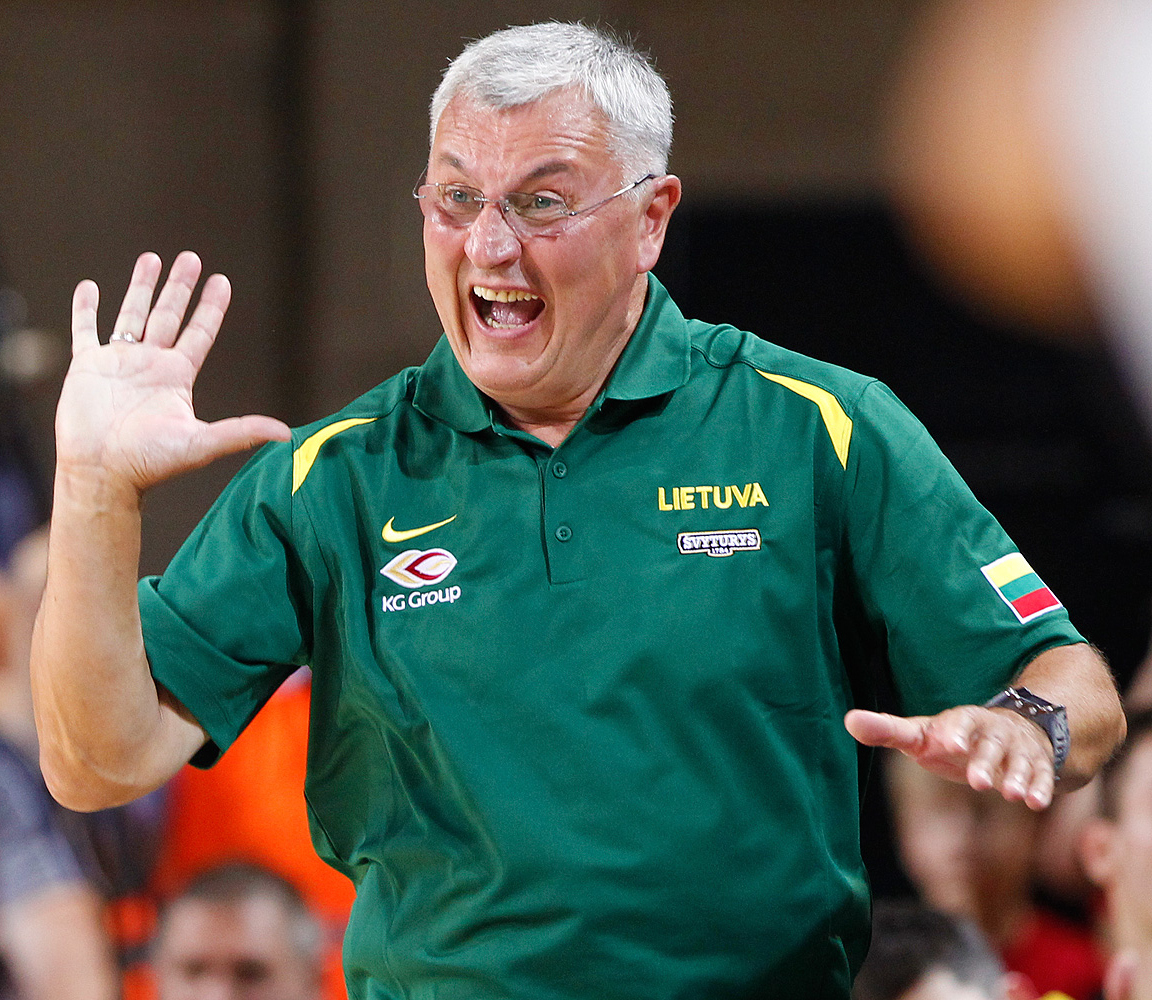
- Kazlauskas coaching the Lithuania men's national basketball team in 2013

Personal information
- Born: 21 November 1954 (age 71) Panevėžys, Lithuania
- Listed height: 6 ft 3 in (1.91 m)
- Listed weight: 210 lb (95 kg)

Career information
- NBA draft: 1976: undrafted
- Playing career: 1973–1985
- Position: Shooting guard
- Coaching career: 1994–present

Career history

Playing
- 1973–1985: Statyba Vilnius

Coaching
- 1994–2000: Žalgiris Kaunas
- 2001–2004: Lietuvos rytas Vilnius
- 2004–2006: Olympiacos Piraeus
- 2011–2012: CSKA Moscow
- 2013–2014 2017–2018: Guangdong Southern Tigers

Career highlights
- As head coach: 6× LKL champion (1995–1999, 2002); FIBA EuroCup winner (1998); EuroLeague champion (1999); 2× NEBL champion (1999, 2002); 2× LKL Coach of the Year (2002, 2003); 2× PBL champion (2011, 2012); PBL Coach of the Year (2012); CBA champion (2013)
Medals
Men's basketball
Representing Lithuania
Summer Olympic Games
Bronze medal – third place	2000 Sydney
EuroBasket
Silver medal – second place	2013 Slovenia
Silver medal – second place	2015 France–Croatia–Germany–Latvia
Representing China
FIBA Asia Cup
Gold medal – first place	2005 Qatar
Representing Greece
EuroBasket
Bronze medal – third place	2009 Poland

Jonas Kazlauskas (born 21 November 1954) is a Lithuanian professional basketball coach and former player. He was most recently the head coach of the Guangdong Southern Tigers in the Chinese Basketball Association (CBA).

== Playing career ==
Kazlauskas played for Statyba Vilnius from 1973 to 1985. He won a bronze medal in the former USSR Supreme League in 1979.

== Coaching career ==
=== Clubs ===
Kazlauskas is considered to be one of the best coaches from Europe. In the past, he has coached Lithuania's top two pro club basketball teams, Žalgiris Kaunas (1994–2000) and Lietuvos rytas Vilnius (2001–2004). In October 2004, he became the head coach of Olympiacos Piraeus, and later moved to CSKA Moscow during the 2010–11 season.

Kazlauskas took a position with the Guangdong Southern Tigers for the latter stage of the 2012–13 Chinese Basketball Association season, serving as "executive coach" to fill the role of experienced mentor for newly appointed head coach Du Feng, and helping guide the team to their record-tying eighth title in the 2013 CBA Finals. He retained his role with Guangdong for the 2013–14 CBA season but the squad lost in the semi-finals of the 2014 CBA Playoffs.

Kazlauskas returned to the Southern Tigers as head coach for the 2017–18 CBA season, while Du was serving as head coach with the "China Blue" version of the country's national team, and led a rebuilding side to third place with 28 wins in 38 regular season games before the youthful squad were eliminated in the semi-finals of the 2018 CBA Playoffs. He handed the head coaching job back to Du after the season.

=== National teams ===
In 1997, Kazlauskas became the head coach of the Lithuanian national team with whom he won bronze medals at 2000 Summer Olympics and held that position until the end of EuroBasket 2001. In 2004, he joined the China national team as the assistant coach to Del Harris, and then served as the head coach from 2005 to 2008, winning the 2005 Asian championship.

From 2009 to 2010, Kazlauskas served as the head coach of the Greek national team and guided them to bronze medals at EuroBasket 2009. In 2012, he returned to Lithuanian national team and guided them to two consecutive silver medals at 2013 and 2015 EuroBasket tournaments. In 2016, Kazlauskas left the team for the second time after his 4-year contract expired after the 2016 Summer Olympics.

== Coaching awards and achievements ==
=== State awards ===
- Lithuania: Recipient of the Commander's Cross of the Order of the Lithuanian Grand Duke Gediminas (1996)
- Lithuania: Recipient of the Commander's Grand Cross of the Order of the Lithuanian Grand Duke Gediminas (1999)
- Lithuania: Recipient of the Grand Cross of the Order for Merits to Lithuania (2013)

=== Club ===
- 6× LKL champion: 1995–1999, 2002
- Baltic Cup winner: 1998
- FIBA EuroCup champion: 1998
- Euroleague champion: 1999
- 2× NEBL champion: 1999, 2002
- 2× PBL champion: 2011, 2012
- CBA champion: 2013
- 2× LKL Coach of the Year: 2002, 2013
- PBL Coach of the Year: 2012

=== National team ===
- Lithuanian national team:
  - Summer Olympic Games Bronze: 2000
  - 2× EuroBasket Silver: 2013, 2015
- China national team:
  - FIBA Asia Cup Gold: 2005
  - Asian Games Gold: 2006
- Greek national team:
  - EuroBasket Bronze: 2009

== Personal life ==
Kazlauskas and his wife have two daughters. He likes tennis, crosswords and computer games.

== Coaching record ==
Legend
G	Games coached	W	Games won	L	Games lost	W–L %	Win-loss %

Note: The EuroLeague is not the only competition in which the team played during the season. He also coached in domestic competition, and regional competition if applicable.

=== EuroLeague ===
Team	Year	G	W	L	W–L%	Result
Žalgiris
Žalgiris	1998–99	22	18	4	.818	Won EuroLeague Championship
Žalgiris	1999-00	16	4	12	.250	Eliminated in qualification round
Olympiacos	2004–05	14	4	10	.286	Eliminated in regular season
Olympiacos	2005–06	23	12	11	.522	Eliminated in quarterfinals
CSKA	2011–12	22	19	3	.864	Lost in the final game
Career		97	57	40	.588	

== See also ==
- List of EuroLeague-winning head coaches
