= BC Statyba =

Lithuanian basketball team

Statyba Vilnius
- Founded: 1963
- Dissolved: 1997 ^{‡}
- History: BC Žalgiris; 1963–1964; BC Plastikas; 1964; BC Statyba; 1964–1997
- Location: Vilnius, Lithuania
- Team colors: Black, white
- Championships: 6 Lithuanian SSR Championships; 5 Lithuanian SSR "Sports" Cups; 2 USSR A class League

BC Statyba was a basketball club from Vilnius, Lithuania. It was renamed to Lietuvos rytas in 1997.

== History ==
In 1963, Vilnius's first basketball club, called Žalgiris, was established. In 1964, the team changed its name to Plastikas, but was renamed to Statyba before the start of the season. In 1965, Statyba became the Žalgiris association champions, and finished third in the Lithuanian cup tournament. The next year they improved and finished in second place in the Lithuanian cup tournament. In 1966, the team made their debut in the USSR A class championship, which was a second-tier championship, where they finished in fourth place. Statyba's most successful season came in 1979, when they finished in third place in the top division – the USSR Premier Basketball League. Over the years, Statyba became one of the biggest rivals for Žalgiris Kaunas. After the leaving the USSR championship, Statyba participated in the Lithuanian championship and the LKF Cup, finishing second in 1991 and 1992. Statyba joined the Lithuanian Basketball League when it was established in the 1993–94 season. Statyba won third place in the inaugural season, but over the next few years, plummeted in the standings, finishing with a disastrous last place finish in the 1996–97 season.

In 1997, the club was purchased by Lietuvos rytas newspaper's owner Gedvydas Vainauskas. He denounced Statyba and its history claiming that his club is not related to Statyba and renamed the club to Statyba-Lietuvos rytas in 1997 and then to Lietuvos rytas in 1998. Many Statyba's players, coaches—present or past—and fans, condemned the actions of new owner and dissociated themselves from the new club.

In 2011, Statyba's fans, players and coaches re-established the club and claimed to be the successors of the old club.

In 2017, under new ownership, Lietuvos rytas took back the history of Statyba.

== Notable players ==
- (Lithuania) Dainius Adomaitis 1993–1996
- (Lithuania) Romanas Brazdauskis 1983–1984, 1986–1988
- (Lithuania) Rimas Girskis 1968–1983
- (Lithuania) Artūras Karnišovas 1987–1990
- (Lithuania) Jonas Kazlauskas 1973–1985
- (Ukraine) Anatolij Kovtun 1986–1987
- (Lithuania) Linas Kvedaravičius 1985–1990
- (Lithuania) Šarūnas Marčiulionis 1981–1989
- (Lithuania) Algimantas Pavilonis 1973–1985
- (Lithuania) Alvydas Pazdrazdis 1991–1992
- (Lithuania) Alfredas Vainauskas 1979–1990, 1993–1995

== Head coaches ==
- (Lithuania) Antanas Paulauskas (1964–1975) (team founder)
- (Lithuania) Rimantas Endrijaitis (1975–1987) (former captain)
- (Lithuania) Rimas Girskis (1988–1990) (former captain)
- (Lithuania) Eduardas Kairys (1990–1992) (former player)
- (Lithuania) Rimantas Endrijaitis (1992–1994) (former captain)
- (Estonia) Heino Lill (1994–1995) (former assistant coach)
- (Lithuania) Alfredas Vainauskas (1995–1997) (former player)

== Achievements ==
- Žalgiris association
  - Champions (1): 1965
- USSR Premier League
  - Third place (1): 1979
- LKF Cup
  - Runners-up (1): 1990
- LKL
  - Third place (1): 1994
- Lithuanian SSR Championship
  - Champions (6): 1972, 1973, 1975, 1977, 1981, 1984
  - Runners-up (13): 1966, 1968, 1970, 1971, 1976, 1978, 1979, 1980, 1983, 1985, 1991, 1992
- Lithuanian "Sports" Cup
  - Champions (5): 1968, 1969, 1981, 1983, 1985
  - Runners-up (2): 1984, 1992
  - Third place (2): 1965, 1982
- USSR A class
  - Champions (2): 1971, 1974
  - Runners-up (1): 1973
  - Third place (2): 1969, 1970
