= Tyus Edney =

American basketball player and coach

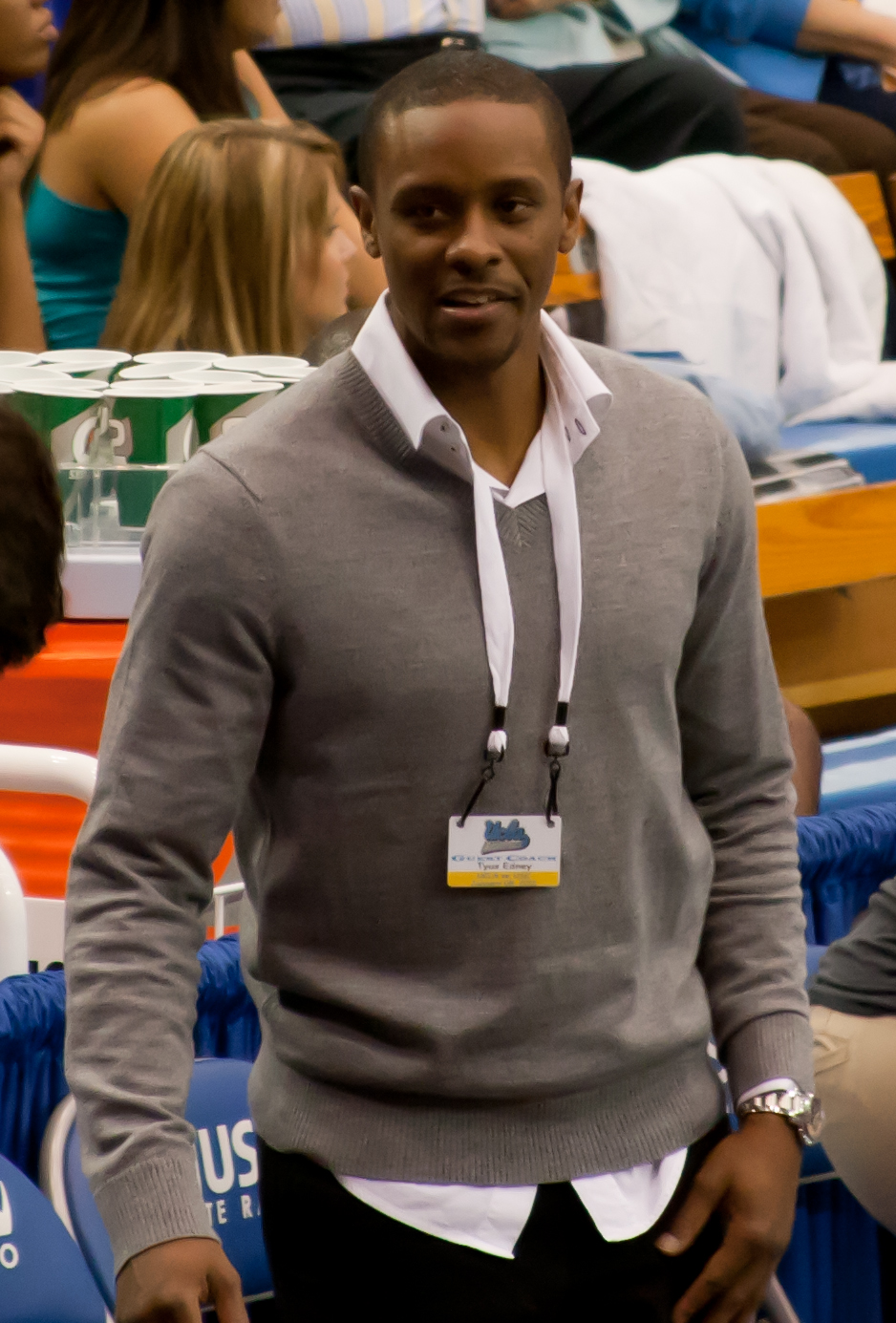
- Edney in 2011

Personal information
- Born: February 14, 1973 (age 53) Gardena, California, U.S.
- Listed height: 5 ft 10 in (1.78 m)
- Listed weight: 195 lb (88 kg)

Career information
- High school: Long Beach Polytechnic (Long Beach, California)
- College: UCLA (1991–1995)
- NBA draft: 1995: 2nd round, 47th overall pick
- Drafted by: Sacramento Kings
- Playing career: 1995–2010
- Position: Point guard
- Number: 5, 20, 2, 4
- Coaching career: 2017–present

Career history

Playing
- 1995–1997: Sacramento Kings
- 1997–1998: Boston Celtics
- 1998–1999: Žalgiris Kaunas
- 1999–2000: Benetton Treviso
- 2000–2001: Indiana Pacers
- 2001–2004: Benetton Treviso
- 2004–2005: Lottomatica Roma
- 2005–2006: Olympiacos
- 2006–2007: Climamio Bologna
- 2007–2008: BC Azovmash
- 2008: Caja San Fernando
- 2009–2010: Turów Zgorzelec

Coaching
- 2017–2019: UCLA (assistant)
- 2022–2024: San Diego (assistant)
- 2024–2026: Pepperdine (assistant)

Career highlights
- NBA All-Rookie Second Team (1996); EuroLeague champion (1999); EuroLeague Final Four MVP (1999); 2× All-EuroLeague First Team (2002, 2003); FIBA EuroStar (1999); FIBA EuroStars MVP (1999); 2× Italian League champion (2002, 2003); 3× Italian Cup winner (2000, 2003, 2004); 2× Italian Supercup winner (2001, 2002); Italian Cup MVP (2003); 2× Italian Supercup MVP (2001, 2002); Italian League All-Star (2003); Greek League All-Star (2006); Lithuanian League champion (1999); North European League champion (1999); Ukrainian League champion (2008); Ukrainian Cup winner (2008); NCAA champion (1995); 3× First-team All-Pac-10 (1993–1995); Frances Pomeroy Naismith Award (1995); UCLA Athletics Hall of Fame (2009); Pac-12 Conference Hall of Honor (2014)

Career NBA statistics
- Points: 1,728 (7.6 ppg)
- Assists: 910 (4.0 apg)
- Steals: 217 (1.0 spg)
- Stats at NBA.com
- Stats at Basketball Reference
Medals
Men's basketball
Representing United States
Goodwill Games
Bronze medal – third place	1994 St. Petersburg

Tyus Dwayne Edney Sr. (born February 14, 1973) is an American basketball coach and former player. Listed at 5 feet 10 inches (1.78 m), he played point guard. He played college basketball for the UCLA Bruins from 1991 to 1995, leading them to the 1995 NCAA national championship. His game-winning shot for UCLA in the second round of the 1995 NCAA Tournament is considered one of the most famous plays in NCAA Tournament history. A two-time All-EuroLeague First Team selection, he led Žalgiris Kaunas to the 1999 EuroLeague title and was named the EuroLeague Final Four MVP. He became an assistant coach for UCLA, the San Diego Toreros and Pepperdine Waves.

== College career ==
In his freshman season at UCLA in 1992, Edney was named the most valuable freshman player on his team. In his sophomore season, Edney was voted the team's most valuable player (MVP), and he was named to the first-team All-Pacific-10 (Pac-10) Conference team. He was again named to the first-team All-Pac-10 conference team in 1994. As a senior in 1994–95, Edney set personal bests in total points (456), steals (74), and assists (216). He was named the team's co-MVP along with Ed O'Bannon, the team's most outstanding defensive player, first-team All-Pac-10 for the third consecutive year, and won the Frances Pomeroy Naismith Award as the nation's best player under 6 feet (1.8 m) tall.

Edney was inducted into the UCLA Athletics Hall of Fame in 2009, as well as the Pac-12 Conference Hall of Honor in 2014. He ranks second in the school's history in career assists (652) and third in steals (224).

=== 1995 NCAA Tournament ===
Edney's late-game heroics in the 1995 Men's Division I Basketball Tournament earned him a spot in NCAA Tournament lore. His UCLA squad had played well in the 1994–1995 season, earning a No. 1 seed in the tournament's West Region. Favored in their second-round match against eighth seed Missouri, UCLA fell behind 74–73 with 4.8 seconds remaining. Bruins coach Jim Harrick called a timeout, then called a play for point guard Edney, rather than star player Ed O'Bannon.

Cameron Dollar inbounded the ball to Edney, who caught it in stride and ran up the left sideline. A Missouri defender picked him up near the top of the key, but loosely, to avoid fouling. At midcourt, another defender attempted to trap, but Edney used a behind-the-back dribble to evade the pressure. After Edney reached the Missouri key, 6'9" Missouri forward Derek Grimm slid over to stop him. Edney adjusted his shot around Grimm, and banked the shot in as the game-ending red light blazed. UCLA won the game, 75–74.

Two games later against the Connecticut Huskies, Edney had another chance at a full-court run before the half, and drained a 30-foot 3-pointer en route to a 102–96 victory. UCLA went on to win its 11th NCAA basketball championship, defeating the defending champion Arkansas Razorbacks 89–78 in a game that Edney, who injured a wrist in the semi-final win vs. Oklahoma State, mostly watched from the bench.

Edney was named to the Tournament Western Regional All-Tournament team.

== Professional playing career ==
=== NBA ===
Edney was selected by the Sacramento Kings in the second round of the 1995 NBA draft with the 47th overall pick. He was named to the NBA All-Rookie Second Team and played with the Kings for two seasons (1995–1997). He spent the 1997–1998 season with the Boston Celtics. After playing in Europe for two years (Lithuania, 1998–1999; and Italy, 1999–2000), he returned to the NBA and played with the Indiana Pacers, in the 2000–2001 season.

In total, he played in four NBA seasons, scoring a total of 491. His best season, as measured by his average of 10.8 points per game, was his rookie year with the Kings.

=== Europe ===
In the 1998–1999 season, Edney won the EuroLeague championship with the Lithuanian club Žalgiris Kaunas, earning the EuroLeague Final Four MVP award in the process. He and teammate George Zidek, who also won a title with Edney at UCLA, became the first players to win both an NCAA and EuroLeague championship.

Edney played in Italy, during the 1999–2000 season, with Benetton Treviso (losing in the Italian League finals, and winning the Italian Cup title). After that season, he spent the next season (2000–2001) playing in the NBA.

After his departure from the NBA in 2001, Edney bounced around several European teams. During a 2001–2004 stint with Benetton Treviso, he won the Italian league in 2002 and 2003, the Italian Cup in 2003 and 2004, and the Italian Supercup in 2001 and 2002; he also played in the 2003 EuroLeague Final. He played with Lottomatica Roma in the 2004–2005 season.

George Garbolas brought Edney to Olympiacos to help rebuild the team, but he only played there for one season, in 2005–2006. In the 2006–2007 season, he returned to Italy, to play with Climamio Bologna. He started the 2008–2009 season in the Spanish club Cajasol Sevilla, and then (January 2009) moved to the Polish club Turów Zgorzelec.

In a 2005 profile in the Los Angeles Times, former UCLA Bruin teammate Ed O'Bannon, said that Edney was hugely popular in Europe, saying, "his style, his size, the fact that his teams always win; he's somewhat of a novelty, a celebrity. When my teammates overseas found out that I played with him, it would be like someone in the States finding out that you played with Michael Jordan."

== Later years ==
On August 2, 2010, UCLA head coach Ben Howland announced that Edney had joined the Bruins as director of men's basketball operations. He held the job for seven years, during which UCLA made it to the NCAA Tournament five times.

On April 21, 2017, UCLA announced that Edney had been promoted to a full assistant on head coach Steve Alford's staff, replacing Ed Schilling, who left to join Archie Miller's staff at Indiana. Alford was fired midseason in 2018–19. After the season, Edney was not retained by new head coach Mick Cronin. In August 2019, Edney was named the director of engagement for the UCLA athletic department.

Edney joined the San Diego Toreros men's team in 2022 to serve as an assistant under head coach Steve Lavin, who was an assistant coach at UCLA during Edney's college playing career. Edney joined the Pepperdine Waves men's team in April 2024 to serve as an assistant coach.

== Career statistics ==
Legend
GP	Games played	GS	Games started	MPG	Minutes per game
FG%	Field-goal percentage	3P%	3-point field-goal percentage	FT%	Free-throw percentage
RPG	Rebounds per game	APG	Assists per game	SPG	Steals per game
BPG	Blocks per game	PPG	Points per game	PIR	Performance index rating
**Bold**	Career high

=== NBA ===
==== Regular season ====
Year	Team	GP	GS	MPG	FG%	3P%	FT%	RPG	APG	SPG	BPG	PPG
1995–96	Sacramento	**80**	**60**	**31.0**	.412	**.368**	.782	**2.5**	**6.1**	**1.1**	.0	**10.8**
1996–97	Sacramento	70	20	19.7	.384	.190	.823	1.6	3.2	0.9	.0	6.9
1997–98	Boston	52	7	12.0	**.431**	.300	.793	1.1	2.7	1.0	.0	5.3
2000–01	Indiana	24	0	11.0	.385	.167	**.897**	1.0	2.3	.7	.0	4.4
Career		226	87	21.0	.405	.322	.806	1.7	4.0	1.0	.0	7.6

==== Playoffs ====
Year	Team	GP	GS	MPG	FG%	3P%	FT%	RPG	APG	SPG	BPG	PPG
1996	Sacramento	**4**	**4**	**30.3**	**.429**	**.250**	**.833**	**3.0**	**2.8**	**2.0**	.0	**12.0**
2001	Indiana	2	0	5.0	.286	.000	.000	.0	1.5	.5	.0	2.0
Career		6	4	21.8	.408	.222	.769	2.0	2.3	1.5	.0	8.7

=== EuroLeague ===
Year	Team	GP	GS	MPG	FG%	3P%	FT%	RPG	APG	SPG	BPG	PPG	PIR
1998–99 (FIBA)	Žalgiris	22	—	27.4	.505	.360	.757	2.6	**6.1**	1.8	0.0	12.5	—
1999–00 (FIBA)	Benetton	14	—	**33.6**	.497	.412	.800	**3.8**	3.4	**2.2**	0.0	16.9	—
2001–02	Benetton	19	16	30.3	**.513**	.418	.786	3.6	3.8	2.1	**.1**	**17.9**	**20.3**
2002–03	Benetton	18	17	28.7	.509	**.524**	**.843**	2.4	4.3	1.6	**.1**	16.5	18.2
2003–04	Benetton	18	17	30.1	.458	.333	.840	1.9	4.6	1.3	**.1**	15.2	16.9
2005–06	Olympiacos	**23**	**23**	30.6	.474	.343	.776	3.0	4.5	1.1	.0	13.3	15.2
2006–07	Climamio Bologna	12	10	30.1	.471	.263	.814	2.5	4.1	1.0	.0	12.7	13.9
Career		126	83	30.0	.490	.392	.796	2.9	4.5	1.6	.1	14.9	17.0

== Personal life ==
Edney married his first wife, Buffy, shortly after graduating from UCLA. They have two daughters, Kennedi and Kolbi-Rae. Edney met his Italian-Brazilian second wife, Aiñoa Da Silva, in Treviso, and they have a son Tyus Jr. Edney's daughter Kennedi is a college gymnast for the LSU Tigers, a winner of the vault title at the 2019 NCAA Women's Gymnastics Championship.

== See also ==
- List of NCAA Division I men's basketball players with 11 or more steals in a game
