= George Zidek =

Czech basketball player (born 1973)

Personal information
- Born: 2 August 1973 (age 53) Gottwaldov, Czechoslovakia
- Listed height: 7 ft 0 in (2.13 m)
- Listed weight: 250 lb (113 kg)

Career information
- High school: Arabska Secondary
- College: UCLA (1991–1995)
- NBA draft: 1995: 1st round, 22nd overall pick
- Drafted by: Charlotte Hornets
- Playing career: 1995–2005
- Position: Center
- Number: 25, 52

Career history
- 1995–1997: Charlotte Hornets
- 1997–1998: Denver Nuggets
- 1998: Seattle SuperSonics
- 1998–2000: Žalgiris
- 2000: Ülker
- 2000–2001: Real Madrid
- 2001–2002: Alba Berlin
- 2002–2003: Prokom Trefl Sopot
- 2003–2005: ČEZ Nymburk

Career highlights
- EuroLeague champion (1999); FIBA EuroStar (1999); NCAA champion (1995)

Career NBA statistics
- Points: 453 (3.4 ppg)
- Rebounds: 286 (2.1 rpg)
- Stats at NBA.com
- Stats at Basketball Reference

Jiří "George" Zídek Jr. (born 2 August 1973), is a Czech former professional basketball player who is a sports commentator. He played college basketball in the United States for the UCLA Bruins from 1991 to 1995. He then became the first Czech player ever drafted into the National Basketball Association (NBA), when he was selected by the Charlotte Hornets in the first round of the 1995 NBA draft. He played in the NBA for a total of three seasons and then played professionally in Europe, before retiring in 2006.

== Early life ==
Zídek was born in Gottwaldov, Czechoslovakia (now Zlín, Czech Republic). His father, Jiří Zídek Sr., was a star for USK Slavia Prague in the 1960s and 1970s, leading them to victory in the European 2nd-tier level 1968–69 season's European Cup Winners' Cup (one of the predecessor league's to today's EuroCup). The Zideks are the first (and as of 2010, the only) father and son ever to reach a EuroLeague Finals game.

== College career ==
In 1991, Zídek relocated to the United States, to attend the University of California, Los Angeles, where he played on the UCLA Bruins men's basketball team from 1991 to 1995. While in America, he became known as George. Zídek was the starting center of UCLA's 1995 NCAA championship team.

== Professional career ==
The 7-foot Zídek was selected by the Charlotte Hornets in the first round of the 1995 NBA draft, with the 22nd overall pick. He was the first Czech player ever drafted by an NBA team, and was then followed by Jiří Welsch, who was drafted in 2002. Zidek spent three seasons in the NBA, playing for the Hornets, the Denver Nuggets, and the Seattle SuperSonics, averaging 3.4 points per game in his NBA career.

In 1998, he returned to Europe, joining former UCLA teammate Tyus Edney on the roster of the Lithuanian power Žalgiris. His first season back in Europe saw him lift the EuroLeague championship trophy with Žalgiris, which was the first time a Lithuanian team won the EuroLeague title. He and Edney became the first players to win both an NCAA and a EuroLeague championship. Zidek's European career took him to several other teams before he returned to the Czech Republic, where he helped ČEZ Nymburk to Czech national league titles in 2004 and 2005. He took the 2005–06 season off to recuperate from knee surgery, and served at the end of the season as a EuroLeague TV commentator for the EuroLeague Final Four, which was held in Prague. However, due to ongoing health problems, Zídek never returned to the court as a player, and in 2006 he announced his retirement from playing basketball. He subsequently became a sports commentator for the EuroLeague, working for EuroLeague TV.

== Personal ==
He is from a basketball family. His father Jiří Zídek Sr. and his son Jan Zídek also play or played basketball professionally.

== See also ==
- 1994–95 UCLA Bruins men's basketball team
