= List of Lithuanian basketball league champions =

The List of Lithuanian basketball league champions is composed of the top-tier level national domestic men's basketball league champions of each year, in the country of Lithuania. Including from before, during, and after the era of the former Soviet republic of the Lithuania SSR.

== Lithuanian League champions (1924–1941) ==
- 1924 LFLS Kaunas
- 1925 Kovas Kaunas
- 1926 LFLS Kaunas
- 1927 LFLS Kaunas
- 1928 LFLS Kaunas
- 1933 LGSF Kaunas
- 1934 LGSF Kaunas
- 1934–35 LFLS Kaunas
- 1935–36 LFLS Kaunas
- 1936–37 CJSO Kaunas
- 1937–38 CJSO Kaunas
- 1938–39 (Note: Not finished) CJSO Kaunas
- 1939–40 CJSO Kaunas
- 1941 Perkūnas Kaunas

== Lithuanian SSR League champions (1945–1990) ==
- 1945 ASK Kaunas
- 1946 Žalgiris Kaunas
- 1947 KKI Kaunas
- 1948 KKI Kaunas
- 1949 KKI Kaunas
- 1950 Žalgiris Kaunas
- 1951 KKI Kaunas
- 1952 Žalgiris Kaunas
- 1953 Žalgiris Kaunas
- 1954 Žalgiris Kaunas
- 1955 Žalgiris Kaunas
- 1956 Kaunas
- 1957–58 Žalgiris Kaunas
- 1958 Žalgiris Kaunas
- 1958–59 KPI Kaunas
- 1959–60 LŽŪA Kaunas
- 1960–61 LŽŪA Kaunas
- 1961–62 Maistas Klaipėda
- 1963 Kaunas
- 1963–64 Drobė Kaunas
- 1964–65 Politechnika Kaunas
- 1966 Politechnika Kaunas
- 1967 Kaunas
- 1968 Atletas Kaunas
- 1969 Drobė Kaunas
- 1970 Drobė Kaunas
- 1971 Banga Kaunas
- 1972 Statyba Vilnius
- 1973 Statyba Vilnius
- 1974 Kaunas
- 1975 Statyba Vilnius
- 1976 Drobė Kaunas
- 1977 Statyba Vilnius
- 1977–78 Drobė Kaunas
- 1979 Drobė Kaunas
- 1979–80 Drobė Kaunas
- 1981 Statyba Vilnius
- 1982 Atletas Kaunas
- 1983 Atletas Kaunas
- 1984 Statyba Vilnius
- 1985 Lietkabelis Panevėžys
- 1985–86 Drobė Kaunas
- 1987 Drobė Kaunas
- 1987–88 Lietkabelis Panevėžys
- 1988–89 Atletas Kaunas
- 1989–90 Atletas Kaunas

== Lithuanian League champions (1990–1993) ==
- 1990–91 Žalgiris Kaunas
- 1991–92 Žalgiris Kaunas
- 1992–93 Žalgiris Kaunas

== Lithuanian LKL League champions (1993–present) ==
The champions of the Lithuanian Basketball League LKL Finals:

- 1993–94 Žalgiris Kaunas
- 1994–95 Žalgiris Kaunas
- 1995–96 Žalgiris Kaunas
- 1996–97 Žalgiris Kaunas
- 1997–98 Žalgiris Kaunas
- 1998–99 Žalgiris Kaunas
- 1999–2000 Lietuvos rytas Vilnius
- 2000–01 Žalgiris Kaunas
- 2001–02 Lietuvos rytas Vilnius
- 2002–03 Žalgiris Kaunas
- 2003–04 Žalgiris Kaunas
- 2004–05 Žalgiris Kaunas
- 2005–06 Lietuvos rytas Vilnius
- 2006–07 Žalgiris Kaunas
- 2007–08 Žalgiris Kaunas
- 2008–09 Lietuvos rytas Vilnius
- 2009–10 Lietuvos rytas Vilnius
- 2010–11 Žalgiris Kaunas
- 2011–12 Žalgiris Kaunas
- 2012–13 Žalgiris Kaunas
- 2013–14 Žalgiris Kaunas
- 2014–15 Žalgiris Kaunas
- 2015–16 Žalgiris Kaunas
- 2016–17 Žalgiris Kaunas
- 2017–18 Žalgiris Kaunas
- 2018–19 Žalgiris Kaunas
- 2019–20 (Note: Žalgiris declared champion through regular season standings after the premature ending of the league due to the coronavirus pandemic.) Žalgiris Kaunas
- 2020–21 Žalgiris Kaunas
- 2021–22 Rytas Vilnius
- 2022–23 Žalgiris Kaunas
- 2023–24 Rytas Vilnius
- 2024–25 Žalgiris Kaunas
- 2025–26 Žalgiris Kaunas

== Titles by club ==
Club	Trophies	Winning years
Žalgiris Kaunas	37	1946, 1950, 1952, 1953, 1954, 1955, 1958, 1958, 1991, 1992, 1993, 1994, 1995, 1996, 1997, 1998, 1999, 2001, 2003, 2004, 2005, 2007, 2008, 2011, 2012, 2013, 2014, 2015, 2016, 2017, 2018, 2019, 2020, 2021, 2023, 2025, 2026
Drobė Kaunas	9	1964, 1969, 1970, 1976, 1978, 1979, 1980, 1986, 1987
Lietuvos rytas /Rytas Vilnius	7	2000, 2002, 2006, 2009, 2010, 2022, 2024
LFLS Kaunas	6	1924, 1926, 1927, 1928, 1935, 1936
Statyba Vilnius	6	1972, 1973, 1975, 1977, 1981, 1984
Atletas Kaunas	5	1968, 1982, 1983, 1989, 1990
KKI Kaunas	4	1947, 1948, 1949, 1951
Spartakiada Kaunas	4	1956, 1963, 1967, 1974
CJSO Kaunas	3	1937, 1938, 1940
LGSF Kaunas	2	1933, 1934
LŽŪA Kaunas	2	1960, 1961
Politechnika Kaunas	2	1965, 1966
Lietkabelis	2	1985, 1988
Kovas Kaunas	1	1925
Perkūnas Kaunas	1	1941
ASK Kaunas	1	1945
KPI Kaunas	1	1959
Maistas Klaipėda	1	1962
Banga Kaunas	1	1971

== Lithuanian clubs in USSR League ==
Club	Participations	Seasons in USSR League
SKIF/Žalgiris Kaunas	38	1947, 1948, 1949, 1950, 1951, 1952, 1953, 1954, 1955, 1957, 1958, 1960, 1961, 1962, 1964, 1964–65, 1965–66, 1967–68, 1968–69, 1969–70, 1970–71, 1971–72, 1972-1973, 1973–74, 1974–75, 1975–76, 1976–77, 1977–78, 1978–79, 1979-1980, 1980–81, 1981–82, 1982–83, 1983–84, 1984-1985, 1985–86, 1986–87, 1987–88, 1988–89, 1989-90
Statyba Vilnius	18	1964 (as Plastikas Vilnius), 1971–72, 1974–75, 1975–76, 1976–77, 1977–78, 1978–79, 1979-1980, 1980–81, 1981–82, 1982–83, 1983–84, 1984-1985, 1985–86, 1986–87, 1987–88, 1988–89, 1989–90
ASK Kaunas	1	1945
Zalgiris Klaipeda	1	1954
Spartak Vilnius	1	1961

== See also ==
- Lithuanian Basketball League
- Lithuanian League Finals
- Lithuanian King Mindaugas Cup
- Lithuanian LKF Cup
- Lithuanian Basketball League awards
- LKL All-Star Day
- Basketball in Lithuania
