= LKF Cup =

Men's basketball tournament in Lithuania

- Sport: Basketball
- Founded: 2007
- Folded: 2015
- No. of teams: 8
- Country: Lithuania
- Continent: Europe
- Last champions: (Lithuania) Žalgiris Kaunas (5th title)
- Most titles: (Lithuania) Žalgiris Kaunas (5 titles)
- Website: musukrepsinis.lt/lt/index

The LKF Cup was an annual national domestic cup competition for Lithuanian professional basketball teams. It was organised by the Lithuanian Basketball Federation (Lietuvos Krepšinio Federacija - LKF). The competition's full name was Lietuvos Krepšinio Federacija Taurė (English: Lithuanian Basketball Federation Cup). Before 2007, the LKF Cup wasn't held regularly, but after that, its finals were organised every January, February, or March.

Between 2007 and 2014, the competition was played between teams from the LKL, the NKL, and the RKL. In 2015, the LKF decided to change the competition format, and it was then played between the top eight qualified teams of the LKL, after the first half of the season.

Only three teams, (Žalgiris, Lietuvos rytas, and Prienai) won the cup.

The competition was replaced in 2016, by the King Mindaugas Cup.

== Winners ==
=== Before 2007 ===
Season	Champion	Score	Runner-up	Third
1989–90	Žalgiris	81:80; 89:77; 73:86; 84:76	BC Statyba	
1997–98	Statyba-Lietuvos Rytas		Šiauliai	Šilutė

=== Since 2007 ===
Season	Host	Champion	Score	Runner-up	Third	Score	Fourth	Dates
Final Four format
2007	Klaipėda	Žalgiris	84–65	Lietuvos Rytas	Nevėžis	80–78	Šiauliai	6–7 February 2007
2008	Šiauliai	Žalgiris	83–72	Lietuvos Rytas	Šiauliai	111–92	Neptūnas	5–6 February 2008
2009	Panevėžys	Lietuvos Rytas	84–82	Žalgiris	Šiauliai	97–89	Aisčiai	23–24 January 2009
2010	Vilnius	Lietuvos Rytas	77–65	Žalgiris	Šiauliai	79–76	Nevėžis	19–20 February 2010
2010–11	Alytus	Žalgiris	81–69	Lietuvos Rytas	Prienai	98–74	Neptūnas	12–13 February 2011
2011–12	Kaunas	Žalgiris	99–62	Pieno žvaigždės	Kėdainiai Triobet	69–65	Rudūpis	17–18 February 2012
2012–13	Pasvalys/ Prienai	Prienai	77–75; 81–60	Pieno žvaigždės	Nevėžis and Šiauliai (No 3rd place match)			15–28 March 2013 (Finals)
2013–14	Panevėžys	Prienai	92–91	Lietuvos rytas	Žalgiris	91–67	Neptūnas	29–30 March 2014
Final Eight format
2015	Kaunas	Žalgiris	82–76	Lietuvos rytas	Šiauliai	77–62	Juventus	20–22 February 2015
Renamed as King Mindaugas Cup
2016	Vilnius	Lietuvos Rytas	67–57	Žalgiris	No third place match			21 February 2016
2017	Kaunas	Žalgiris	84–63	Lietkabelis	No third place match			19 February 2017

=== Absences ===
Team	Seasons absent
Lietuvos Rytas	2011–12, 2012–13
Žalgiris	2012–13

== Performance by club (since 2007) ==
Team	Winners	Runners-up	Bronzes	Winning years
Žalgiris	5	3	1	2006–07, 2007–08, 2010–11, 2011–12, 2015
Lietuvos Rytas	3	5	0	2008–09, 2009–10, 2016
Prienai	2	0	1	2012–13, 2013–14
Pieno žvaigždės	0	2	0	
Šiauliai	0	0	4	
Nevėžis	0	0	2	

== Lithuanian Supercup (2012–2013 season) ==
In the 2012–13 season, Lietuvos Rytas and Žalgiris organized a separate competition, called the Lithuanian Supercup. Two games were played in September 2012: the first one, in Kaunas, was won by Žalgiris, 89–71, and in the second leg, in Vilnius, both teams tied 87–87. Žalgiris won the Supercup by an overall aggregate score of 176–158.

== See also ==
- LKL
- LKL MVP
- LKL Finals
- LKL Finals MVP
- King Mindaugas Cup
- King Mindaugas Cup MVP
- List of Lithuanian basketball league champions
- Basketball in Lithuania
