= 1998–99 FIBA EuroLeague =

Sports season

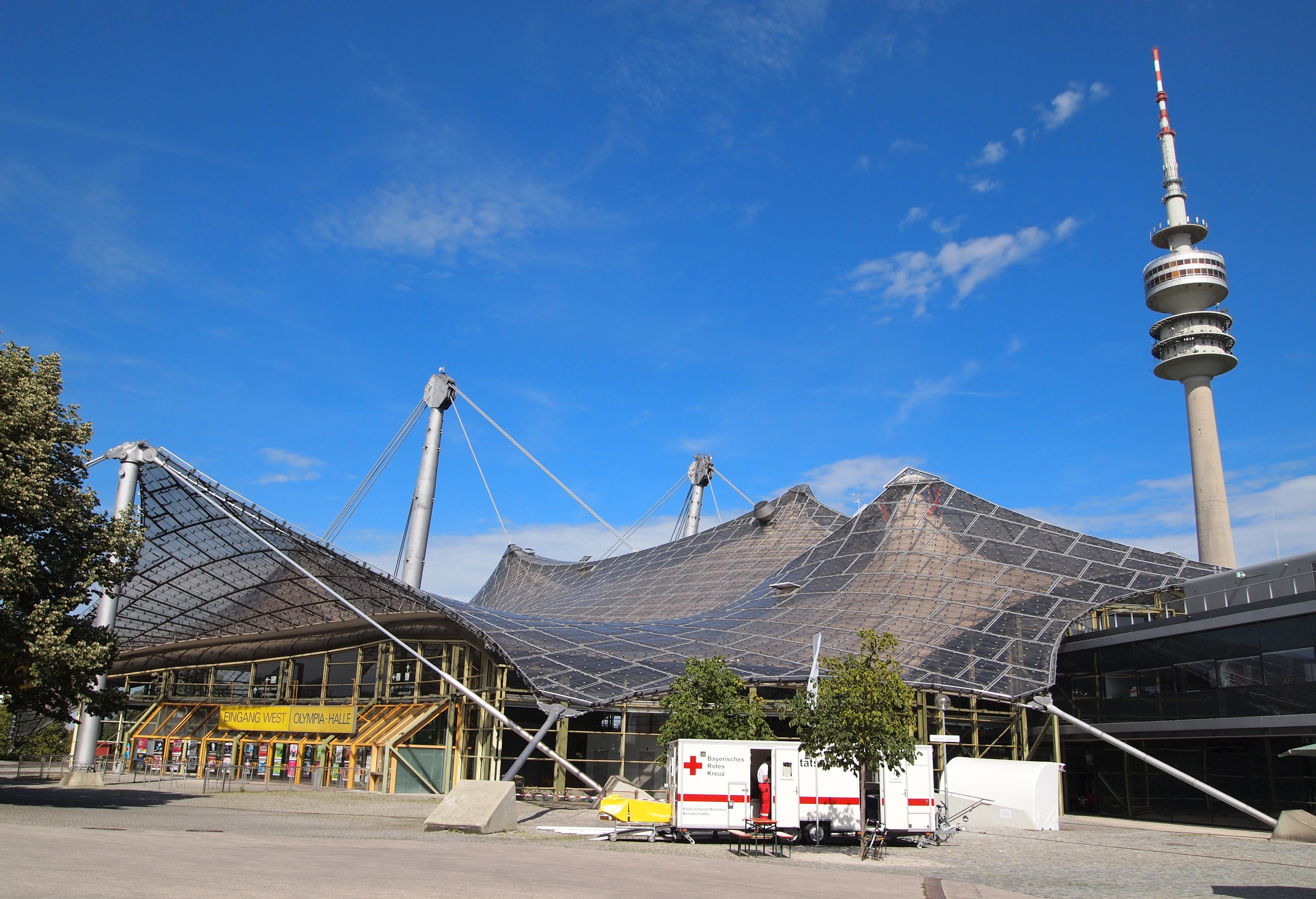
- The Final Four was hosted at the Olympiahalle in Munich
- Season: 1998–99
- Duration: 23 September 1998 – 22 April 1999
- Teams: 24

Finals
- Champions: (Lithuania) Žalgiris (1st title)
- Runners-up: (Italy) Kinder Bologna
- Third place: (Greece) Olympiacos
- Fourth place: (Italy) Teamsystem Bologna
- Final Four MVP: (United States) Tyus Edney

Statistical leaders
| Points | (Turkey) İbrahim Kutluay | 21.4 |
| Rebounds | (Croatia) Žan Tabak | 10.0 |
| Assists | (United States) Tyus Edney | 6.1 |

The 1998–99 FIBA EuroLeague was the 42nd installment of the European top-tier level professional club competition for basketball clubs (now called simply EuroLeague). It began on September 23, 1998, and ended on April 22, 1999. The competition's Final Four was held at Olympiahalle, Munich, with Žalgiris defeating Kinder Bologna in the EuroLeague Final, in front of 9,000 spectators.

== Competition system ==
- 24 teams (the national domestic league champions from the best leagues, and a variable number of other clubs from the most important national domestic leagues). The competition culminated in a Final Four.

== Country ranking ==
For the 1998–1999 EuroLeague, the countries are allocated places according to their place on the FIBA country rankings, which takes into account their performance in European competitions from 1995–96 to 1997–98.

Country ranking for 1998–1999 FIBA EuroLeague

| Rank | Country | Points | Teams | Notes |
|---|---|---|---|---|
| 1 | Greece | 237.000 | 3 | |
| 2 | Italy | 222.833 | 3 | |
| 3 | Spain | 194.500 | 3 | |
| 4 | Turkey | 92.833 | 3 | |
| 5 | France | 88.667 | 2 | ASVEL replaced Limoges |
| 6 | Russia | 67.732 | 2 | +1, Samara got wild card |
| 7 | FR Yugoslavia | 46.333 | 2 | -1, FMP Železnik withdrew |
| 8 | Germany | 38.500 | 2 | -1, Ulm withdrew |
| 9 | Croatia | 35.542 | 1 | +1, Zadar got wild card |
| 10 | Lithuania | 34.667 | 1 | |
| 11 | Slovenia | 33.714 | 1 | |
| 12 | Israel | 31.902 | 1 | |
| 13 | Poland | 21.524 | 0 | |
| 14 | Portugal | 19.794 | 0 | |
| 15 | Belgium | 15.929 | 0 | |
| 16 | Ukraine | 8.905 | 0 | |
| 17 | Macedonia | 6.542 | 0 | |
| 18 | Hungary | 6.429 | 0 | |
| 19 | Austria | 5.417 | 0 | |

| Rank | Country | Points | Teams | Notes |
|---|---|---|---|---|
| 20 | Czech Republic | 4.187 | 0 | |
| 21 | Cyprus | 4.083 | 0 | |
| 22 | Slovakia | 3.944 | 0 | |
| 23 | Sweden | 3.667 | 0 | |
| 24 | England | 3.611 | 0 | |
| 25 | Bulgaria | 3.361 | 0 | |
| 26 | Finland | 2.361 | 0 | |
| 27 | Netherlands | 1.889 | 0 | |
| 28 | Bosnia and Herzegovina | 1.722 | 0 | |
| 29 | Latvia | 1.445 | 0 | |
| 30 | Estonia | 1.333 | 0 | |
| 31 | Romania | 1.056 | 0 | |
| 32 | Luxembourg | 0.889 | 0 | |
| 33 | Albania | 0.694 | 0 | |
| 34 | Georgia | 0.416 | 0 | |
| 35 | Switzerland | 0.278 | 0 | |
| 36 | Denmark | 0.111 | 0 | |
| 37 | Belarus | 0.056 | 0 | |
| 38 | Moldova | 0.056 | 0 | |

== Team allocation ==
The labels in the parentheses show how each team qualified for the place of its starting round:

- 1st, 2nd, 3rd, etc.: League position after Playoffs
- WC: Wild card

Regular season
| (Greece) Panathinaikos (1st) | (Spain) TDK Manresa (1st) | (Russia) CSKA Moscow (1st) | (Croatia) Cibona (1st) |
| (Greece) PAOK (2nd) | (Spain) Tau Cerámica (2nd) | (Russia) Avtodor Saratov (2nd) | (Croatia) Zadar (WC) |
| (Greece) Olympiacos (3rd) | (Spain) Real Madrid Teka (3rd) | (Russia) Samara (WC) | (Germany) Alba Berlin (1st) |
| (Italy) Kinder Bologna (1st) | (Turkey) Ülker (1st) | (France) Pau-Orthez (1st) | (Lithuania) Žalgiris (1st) |
| (Italy) Teamsystem Bologna (2nd) | (Turkey) Efes Pilsen (2nd) | (France) ASVEL (3rd) | (Slovenia) Union Olimpija (1st) |
| (Italy) Varese Roosters (3rd) | (Turkey) Fenerbahçe (3rd) | (Federal Republic of Yugoslavia) Crvena zvezda (1st) | (Israel) Maccabi Elite Tel Aviv (1st) |

== Preliminary round ==
=== Group A ===
| Pos | Team | Pld | W | L | PF | PA | PD | Pts | Qualification | ŽAL | FEN | PAU | TAU | VAR | AVT |
|---|---|---|---|---|---|---|---|---|---|---|---|---|---|---|---|
| 1 | (Lithuania) Žalgiris | 10 | 8 | 2 | 801 | 753 | +48 | 18 | Advance to Group E | — | 64–59 | 70–67 | 80–76 | 97–81 | 77–62 |
| 2 | (Turkey) Fenerbahçe | 10 | 6 | 4 | 777 | 756 | +21 | 16 | Advance to Group E | 99–84 | — | 78–71 | 96–75 | 94–75 | 80–76 |
| 3 | (France) Pau-Orthez | 10 | 5 | 5 | 751 | 731 | +20 | 15 | Advance to Group E | 56–66 | 73–48 | — | 81–71 | 82–67 | 74–71 |
| 4 | (Spain) Tau Cerámica | 10 | 5 | 5 | 778 | 777 | +1 | 15 | Advance to Group F | 91–97 | 63–57 | 88–84 | — | 75–72 | 80–60 |
| 5 | (Italy) Varese Roosters | 10 | 4 | 6 | 802 | 811 | −9 | 14 | Advance to Group F | 75–84 | 92–78 | 89–77 | 86–78 | — | 95–73 |
| 6 | (Russia) Avtodor Saratov | 10 | 2 | 8 | 732 | 813 | −81 | 12 | Advance to Group F | 87–82 | 83–88 | 83–86 | 64–81 | 73–70 | — |

Source: FIBA Europe
Legend: Blue = home team win; Red = away team win.

=== Group B ===
| Pos | Team | Pld | W | L | PF | PA | PD | Pts | Qualification | PAN | EFE | MAC | CIB | TDK | CZV |
|---|---|---|---|---|---|---|---|---|---|---|---|---|---|---|---|
| 1 | (Greece) Panathinaikos | 10 | 10 | 0 | 750 | 628 | +122 | 20 | Advance to Group F | — | 77–63 | 67–58 | 83–70 | 74–58 | 77–71 |
| 2 | (Turkey) Efes Pilsen | 10 | 7 | 3 | 710 | 702 | +8 | 17 | Advance to Group F | 53–80 | — | 81–74 | 80–57 | 82–74 | 73–60 |
| 3 | (Israel) Maccabi Elite Tel Aviv | 10 | 4 | 6 | 690 | 688 | +2 | 14 | Advance to Group F | 62–84 | 66–68 | — | 76–57 | 81–55 | 78–59 |
| 4 | (Croatia) Cibona | 10 | 4 | 6 | 678 | 712 | −34 | 14 | Advance to Group E | 61–69 | 76–70 | 78–60 | — | 54–61 | 77–80 |
| 5 | (Spain) TDK Manresa | 10 | 3 | 7 | 646 | 713 | −67 | 13 | Advance to Group E | 58–63 | 67–68 | 72–65 | 67–79 | — | 74–59 |
| 6 | (Federal Republic of Yugoslavia) Crvena zvezda | 10 | 2 | 8 | 695 | 726 | −31 | 12 | Advance to Group E | 74–76 | 71–72 | 67–70 | 66–69 | 88–60 | — |

Source: FIBA Europe
Legend: Blue = home team win; Red = away team win.

=== Group C ===
| Pos | Team | Pld | W | L | PF | PA | PD | Pts | Qualification | OLY | KIN | CSK | ÜLK | ZAD | ALB |
|---|---|---|---|---|---|---|---|---|---|---|---|---|---|---|---|
| 1 | (Greece) Olympiacos | 10 | 8 | 2 | 746 | 677 | +69 | 18 | Advance to Group G | — | 55–50 | 74–76 | 58–72 | 71–55 | 94–65 |
| 2 | (Italy) Kinder Bologna | 10 | 7 | 3 | 676 | 587 | +89 | 17 | Advance to Group G | 67–72 | — | 86–65 | 66–49 | 62–53 | 78–52 |
| 3 | (Russia) CSKA Moscow | 10 | 5 | 5 | 752 | 739 | +13 | 15 | Advance to Group G | 75–81 | 62–70 | — | 82–76 | 66–68 | 86–75 |
| 4 | (Turkey) Ülker | 10 | 4 | 6 | 675 | 726 | −51 | 14 | Advance to Group H | 79–89 | 49–60 | 64–91 | — | 62–55 | 76–65 |
| 5 | (Croatia) Zadar | 10 | 3 | 7 | 660 | 717 | −57 | 13 | Advance to Group H | 55–67 | 55–65 | 82–79 | 73–85 | — | 79–82 |
| 6 | (Germany) Alba Berlin | 10 | 3 | 7 | 725 | 788 | −63 | 13 | Advance to Group H | 83–85 | 75–72 | 63–70 | 87–63 | 78–85 | — |

Source: FIBA Europe
Legend: Blue = home team win; Red = away team win.

=== Group D ===
| Pos | Team | Pld | W | L | PF | PA | PD | Pts | Qualification | UOL | ASV | RMA | TEA | PAO | SAM |
|---|---|---|---|---|---|---|---|---|---|---|---|---|---|---|---|
| 1 | (Slovenia) Union Olimpija | 10 | 7 | 3 | 702 | 649 | +53 | 17 | Advance to Group H | — | 64–54 | 76–84 | 57–45 | 84–68 | 84–55 |
| 2 | (France) ASVEL | 10 | 7 | 3 | 729 | 700 | +29 | 17 | Advance to Group H | 77–68 | — | 77–73 | 71–66 | 80–66 | 92–69 |
| 3 | (Spain) Real Madrid Teka | 10 | 6 | 4 | 795 | 742 | +53 | 16 | Advance to Group H | 67–68 | 71–70 | — | 65–69 | 77–69 | 101–72 |
| 4 | (Italy) Teamsystem Bologna | 10 | 5 | 5 | 676 | 639 | +37 | 15 | Advance to Group G | 63–66 | 84–61 | 66–73 | — | 76–61 | 77–58 |
| 5 | (Greece) PAOK | 10 | 4 | 6 | 722 | 738 | −16 | 14 | Advance to Group G | 76–68 | 65–69 | 87–75 | 68–59 | — | 85–66 |
| 6 | (Russia) Samara | 10 | 1 | 9 | 685 | 841 | −156 | 11 | Advance to Group G | 60–67 | 74–78 | 88–109 | 59–71 | 84–77 | — |

Source: FIBA Europe
Legend: Blue = home team win; Red = away team win.

== Qualification round ==
(The individual scores and standings of the First round are accumulated in the Second round)

If one or more clubs are level on won-lost record, tiebreakers are applied in the following order:

1. Head-to-head record in matches between the tied clubs
2. Overall point difference in games between the tied clubs
3. Overall point difference in all group matches (first tiebreaker if tied clubs are not in the same group)
4. Points scored in all group matches
5. Sum of quotients of points scored and points allowed in each group match

=== Group E ===
| Pos | Team | Pld | W | L | PF | PA | PD | Pts | Qualification | ŽAL | FEN | CIB | PAU | TDK | CZV |
|---|---|---|---|---|---|---|---|---|---|---|---|---|---|---|---|
| 1 | (Lithuania) Žalgiris | 16 | 12 | 4 | 1259 | 1184 | +75 | 28 | Advance to Play Offs | — | | 64–74 | | 75–66 | 91–65 |
| 2 | (Turkey) Fenerbahçe | 16 | 9 | 7 | 1209 | 1188 | +21 | 25 | Advance to Play Offs | | — | 66–61 | | 76–66 | 78–61 |
| 3 | (Croatia) Cibona | 16 | 8 | 8 | 1114 | 1137 | −23 | 24 | Advance to Play Offs | 71–79 | 85–84 | — | 66–56 | | |
| 4 | (France) Pau-Orthez | 16 | 8 | 8 | 1173 | 1132 | +41 | 24 | Advance to Play Offs | | | 76–79 | — | 66–69 | 70–61 |
| 5 | (Spain) TDK Manresa | 16 | 5 | 11 | 1047 | 1141 | −94 | 21 | | 78–80 | 71–62 | | 51–69 | — | |
| 6 | (Federal Republic of Yugoslavia) Crvena zvezda | 16 | 4 | 12 | 1122 | 1185 | −63 | 20 | | 77–69 | 88–66 | | 75–85 | | — |

Source: FIBA Europe
Legend: Blue = home team win; Red = away team win.

=== Group F ===
| Pos | Team | Pld | W | L | PF | PA | PD | Pts | Qualification | PAN | EFE | MAC | VAR | TAU | AVT |
|---|---|---|---|---|---|---|---|---|---|---|---|---|---|---|---|
| 1 | (Greece) Panathinaikos | 16 | 15 | 1 | 1211 | 1048 | +163 | 31 | Advance to Play Offs | — | | | 82–71 | 86–63 | 86–76 |
| 2 | (Turkey) Efes Pilsen | 16 | 11 | 5 | 1166 | 1148 | +18 | 27 | Advance to Play Offs | | — | | 83–72 | 71–67 | 107–91 |
| 3 | (Israel) Maccabi Elite Tel Aviv | 16 | 7 | 9 | 1225 | 1161 | +64 | 23 | Advance to Play Offs | | | — | 94–78 | 104–64 | 92–69 |
| 4 | (Italy) Varese Roosters | 16 | 7 | 9 | 1253 | 1277 | −24 | 23 | Advance to Play Offs | 63–54 | 67–57 | 100–96 | — | | |
| 5 | (Spain) Tau Cerámica | 16 | 7 | 9 | 1208 | 1252 | −44 | 23 | | 74–77 | 83–61 | 79–76 | | — | |
| 6 | (Russia) Avtodor Saratov | 16 | 3 | 13 | 1190 | 1324 | −134 | 19 | | 73–76 | 66–77 | 83–73 | | | — |

Source: FIBA Europe
Legend: Blue = home team win; Red = away team win.

=== Group G ===
| Pos | Team | Pld | W | L | PF | PA | PD | Pts | Qualification | OLY | KIN | CSK | TEA | PAO | SAM |
|---|---|---|---|---|---|---|---|---|---|---|---|---|---|---|---|
| 1 | (Greece) Olympiacos | 16 | 11 | 5 | 1160 | 1086 | +74 | 27 | Advance to Play Offs | — | | | 62–73 | 57–71 | 85–63 |
| 2 | (Italy) Kinder Bologna | 16 | 10 | 6 | 1099 | 974 | +125 | 26 | Advance to Play Offs | | — | | 72–74 | 78–56 | 80–58 |
| 3 | (Russia) CSKA Moscow | 16 | 10 | 6 | 1206 | 1155 | +51 | 26 | Advance to Play Offs | | | — | 69–67 | 77–67 | 79–68 |
| 4 | (Italy) Teamsystem Bologna | 16 | 9 | 7 | 1100 | 1039 | +61 | 25 | Advance to Play Offs | 60–63 | 67–65 | 83–69 | — | | |
| 5 | (Greece) PAOK | 16 | 7 | 9 | 1128 | 1144 | −16 | 23 | | 72–66 | 71–57 | 69–71 | | — | |
| 6 | (Russia) Samara | 16 | 1 | 15 | 1067 | 1326 | −259 | 17 | | 70–81 | 61–71 | 62–89 | | | — |

Source: FIBA Europe
Legend: Blue = home team win; Red = away team win.

=== Group H ===
| Pos | Team | Pld | W | L | PF | PA | PD | Pts | Qualification | UOL | ASV | RMA | ÜLK | ALB | ZAD |
|---|---|---|---|---|---|---|---|---|---|---|---|---|---|---|---|
| 1 | (Slovenia) Union Olimpija | 16 | 13 | 3 | 1142 | 1014 | +128 | 29 | Advance to Play Offs | — | | | 80–62 | 66–59 | 76–65 |
| 2 | (France) ASVEL | 16 | 9 | 7 | 1193 | 1167 | +26 | 25 | Advance to Play Offs | | — | | 72–56 | 82–88 | 69–61 |
| 3 | (Spain) Real Madrid Teka | 16 | 9 | 7 | 1247 | 1197 | +50 | 25 | Advance to Play Offs | | | — | 72–85 | 74–63 | 86–75 |
| 4 | (Turkey) Ülker | 16 | 7 | 9 | 1110 | 1168 | −58 | 23 | Advance to Play Offs | 61–71 | 86–64 | 85–83 | — | | |
| 5 | (Germany) Alba Berlin | 16 | 6 | 10 | 1144 | 1220 | −76 | 22 | | 57–75 | 73–71 | 79–64 | | — | |
| 6 | (Croatia) Zadar | 16 | 4 | 12 | 1064 | 1149 | −85 | 20 | | 61–72 | 74–56 | 68–73 | | | — |

Source: FIBA Europe
Legend: Blue = home team win; Red = away team win.

== Playoffs ==
=== Bracket ===
Teams in bold advanced to the next round. The numbers to the left of each team indicate the team's seeding, the numbers to the right indicate the result of games including result in bold of the team that won in that game, and the numbers furthest to the right indicate the number of games the team won in that round.

Eight-Finals
**E1** | **(Lithuania) Žalgiris** | **76** | **93** | **2**
H4 | (Turkey) Ülker | 62 | 82 | 0
**F2** | **(Turkey) Efes Pilsen** | **73** | **105** | **2**
G3 | (Russia) CSKA Moscow | 58 | 98 | 0
**G1** | **(Greece) Olympiacos** | **78** | **83** | **2**
F4 | (Italy) Varese Roosters | 66 | 77 | 0
**H2** | **(France) ASVEL** | **95** | 68 | **74** | **2**
E3 | (Croatia) Cibona | 63 | **79** | 70 | 1
F1 | (Greece) Panathinaikos | 58 | 64 | 0
**G4** | **(Italy) Teamsystem Bologna** | **63** | **88** | **2**
E2 | (Turkey) Fenerbahçe | 81 | 74 | 0
**H3** | **(Spain) Real Madrid Teka** | **89** | **85** | **2**
H1 | (Slovenia) Union Olimpija | **72** | 57 | 57 | 1
**E4** | **(France) Pau-Orthez** | 63 | **74** | **64** | **2**
**G2** | **(Italy) Kinder Bologna** | **78** | **70** | **2**
F3 | (Israel) Maccabi Elite Tel Aviv | 57 | 55 | 0

Quarter-Finals
**(Lithuania) Žalgiris** | **69** | **84** | **2**
(Turkey) Efes Pilsen | 68 | 70 | 0
**(Greece) Olympiacos** | **70** | **81** | **2**
(France) ASVEL | 57 | 77 | 0
**(Italy) Teamsystem Bologna** | **90** | **76** | **2**
(Spain) Real Madrid Teka | 63 | 65 | 0
(France) Pau-Orthez | **67** | 75 | 54 | 1
**(Italy) Kinder Bologna** | 59 | **93** | **70** | **2**

Semi-Finals
**(Lithuania) Žalgiris** | **87**
(Greece) Olympiacos | 71
(Italy) Teamsystem Bologna | 57
**(Italy) Kinder Bologna** | **62**

Final
**(Lithuania) Žalgiris** | **82**
(Italy) Kinder Bologna | 74
Third Place
**(Greece) Olympiacos** | **74**
(Italy) Teamsystem Bologna | 63

=== Eight-Finals ===
| Team 1 | Agg. | Team 2 | 1st leg | 2nd leg | 3rd leg |
|---|---|---|---|---|---|
| Efes Pilsen (Turkey) | 2–0 | (Russia) CSKA Moscow | 73–58 | 105–98 | |
| Žalgiris (Lithuania) | 2–0 | (Turkey) Ülker | 76–62 | 93–82 | |
| ASVEL (France) | 2–1 | (Croatia) Cibona | 95–63 | 68–79 | 74–70 |
| Olympiacos (Greece) | 2–0 | (Italy) Varese Roosters | 78–66 | 83–77 | |
| Fenerbahçe (Turkey) | 0–2 | (Spain) Real Madrid Teka | 81–89 | 74–85 | |
| Panathinaikos (Greece) | 0–2 | (Italy) Teamsystem Bologna | 58–63 | 64–88 | |
| Kinder Bologna (Italy) | 2–0 | (Israel) Maccabi Elite Tel Aviv | 78–57 | 70–55 | |
| Union Olimpija (Slovenia) | 1–2 | (France) Pau-Orthez | 72–63 | 57–74 | 57–64 |

=== Quarter-Finals ===
| Team 1 | Agg. | Team 2 | 1st leg | 2nd leg | 3rd leg |
|---|---|---|---|---|---|
| Žalgiris (Lithuania) | 2–0 | (Turkey) Efes Pilsen | 69–68 | 84–70 | |
| Olympiacos (Greece) | 2–0 | (France) ASVEL | 70–57 | 81–77 | |
| Teamsystem Bologna (Italy) | 2–0 | (Spain) Real Madrid Teka | 90–63 | 76–65 | |
| Pau-Orthez (France) | 1–2 | (Italy) Kinder Bologna | 67–59 | 75–93 | 54–70 |

== Final four ==
=== Semifinals ===
April 20, Olympiahalle, Munich

| Team 1 | Score | Team 2 |
|---|---|---|
| Žalgiris (Lithuania) | 87–71 | (Greece) Olympiacos |
| Teamsystem Bologna (Italy) | 57–62 | (Italy) Kinder Bologna |

=== 3rd place game ===
April 22, Olympiahalle, Munich

| Team 1 | Score | Team 2 |
|---|---|---|
| Olympiacos (Greece) | 74–63 | (Italy) Teamsystem Bologna |

=== Final ===
April 22, Olympiahalle, Munich

| Team 1 | Score | Team 2 |
|---|---|---|
| Žalgiris (Lithuania) | 82–74 | (Italy) Kinder Bologna |

1998–99 FIBA EuroLeague Champions

Žalgiris
1st Title

=== Final standings ===
| | Team |
|---|---|
| | (Lithuania) Žalgiris |
| Silver medal | (Italy) Kinder Bologna |
| Bronze medal | (Greece) Olympiacos |
| | (Italy) Teamsystem Bologna |

== Awards ==
All official awards of the 1998–99 FIBA EuroLeague.

=== FIBA EuroLeague Final Four MVP ===
- (United States) Tyus Edney ( (Lithuania) Žalgiris)

=== FIBA EuroLeague All-Final Four Team ===
First Team
| (United States) Tyus Edney (MVP) | (Lithuania) Žalgiris |
| (United States) Anthony Bowie | (Lithuania) Žalgiris |
| (Lithuania) Saulius Štombergas | (Lithuania) Žalgiris |
| (Slovenia) Rašho Nesterović | (Italy) Kinder Bologna |
| (Lithuania) Eurelijus Žukauskas | (Lithuania) Žalgiris |

=== FIBA EuroLeague Top Scorer ===
- (Turkey) İbrahim Kutluay ( (Turkey) Fenerbahçe)

=== FIBA EuroLeague Finals Top Scorer ===
- (France) Antoine Rigaudeau ( (Italy) Virtus Bologna)

== Statistics ==
=== Individual statistics ===
==== Points ====
| Rank | Name | Team | Games | Points | PPG |
|---|---|---|---|---|---|
| 1. | (Turkey) İbrahim Kutluay | (Turkey) Fenerbahçe | 17 | 364 | 21.4 |
| 2. | (Federal Republic of Yugoslavia) Dejan Bodiroga | (Greece) Panathinaikos | 17 | 344 | 20.2 |
| 3. | (Turkey) Harun Erdenay | (Turkey) Ülker | 18 | 362 | 20.1 |

Source: FIBAEurope

==== Rebounds ====
| Rank | Name | Team | Games | Rebounds | RPG |
|---|---|---|---|---|---|
| 1. | (Croatia) Žan Tabak | (Turkey) Fenerbahçe | 18 | 180 | 10.0 |
| 2. | (Turkey) Hüseyin Beşok | (Turkey) Efes Pilsen | 20 | 192 | 9.6 |
| 3. | (United States) Victor Alexander | (Israel) Maccabi Elite Tel Aviv | 18 | 161 | 8.9 |

Source: FIBAEurope

==== Assists ====
| Rank | Name | Team | Games | Assists | APG |
|---|---|---|---|---|---|
| 1. | (United States) Tyus Edney | (Lithuania) Žalgiris | 22 | 135 | 6.1 |
| 2. | (United States) Delaney Rudd | (France) ASVEL | 21 | 124 | 5.9 |
| 3. | (North Macedonia) Petar Naumoski | (Turkey) Efes Pilsen | 19 | 110 | 5.8 |

Source: FIBAEurope

==== Other statistics ====
| Category | Player | Team | Games | Average |
|---|---|---|---|---|
| Steals | (United States) Gerald Lewis | (Croatia) Zadar | 15 | 2.5 |
| Turnovers | (United States) Frankie King | (Greece) PAOK | 15 | 3.5 |
| Minutes | (North Macedonia) Petar Naumoski | (Turkey) Efes Pilsen | 19 | 39.1 |
| FT % | (Lithuania) Artūras Karnišovas | (Italy) Teamsystem Bologna | 20 | 89.6% |
| 2-Point % | (Federal Republic of Yugoslavia) Milenko Topić | (Federal Republic of Yugoslavia) Crvena zvezda | 16 | 64.1% |
| 3-Point % | (Russia) Valeriy Dayneko | (Russia) CSKA Moscow | 18 | 57.9% |

=== Individual game highs ===
| Category | Player | Team | Statistic | Opponent |
|---|---|---|---|---|
| Points | (Turkey) İbrahim Kutluay | (Turkey) Fenerbahçe | 41 | (Croatia) Cibona (Feb 10, 1999) |
| Rebounds | (Turkey) Hüseyin Beşok | (Turkey) Efes Pilsen | 21 | (Italy) Varese Roosters (Jan 7, 1999) |
| Rebounds | (Croatia) Nikola Prkačin | (Croatia) Cibona | 21 | (France) Pau-Orthez (Jan 7, 1999) |
| Assists | (United States) Elmer Bennett | (Spain) Tau Cerámica | 17 | (Lithuania) Žalgiris (Dec 10, 1998) |
| Steals | (Lithuania) Saulius Štombergas | (Lithuania) Žalgiris | 9 | (Croatia) Cibona (Feb 18, 1999) |

=== Team statistics ===
| Category | Team | Average |
|---|---|---|
| Points | (Lithuania) Žalgiris | 79.5 |
| Rebounds | (Russia) Avtodor Saratov | 32.3 |
| Assists | (Lithuania) Žalgiris | 17.1 |
| Steals | (Croatia) Zadar | 12.4 |
| Turnovers | (Russia) Samara | 17.6 |
| FT % | (Russia) Samara | 76.1% |
| 2-Point % | (Greece) Panathinaikos | 57.4% |
| 3-Point % | (Lithuania) Žalgiris | 43.4% |

== See also ==
- 1998–99 FIBA Saporta Cup
- 1998–99 FIBA Korać Cup

== Sources ==
- 98-99 season and budgets
