= Commemorative coins of Lithuania =

The commemorative coins of Lithuania are minted by the Lithuanian Mint (Lithuanian: Lietuvos monetų kalykla), headquartered in Vilnius, Lithuania.

== Commemorative coins issued 1993–2014 ==
Reverse	Obverse	Denomination	Year issued	Dedication
		10 litas	2014	Cinema
		50 litas	2014	25th anniversary of reestablishment of Vytautas Magnus University
		50 litas	2014	500th anniversary of the Battle of Orsha
		50 litas	2014	25th anniversary of Baltic Way
		50 litas	2014	300th birth anniversary of Kristijonas Donelaitis
		10 litas (gold)	2014	Lithuanian science
		50 litas	2013	150th anniversary of the January Uprising
		50 litas	2013	25th anniversary of Sąjūdis
		50 litas	2013	600th anniversary of baptism of Samogitia
		100 litas	2013	400th anniversary of the first map of the Grand Duchy of Lithuania
		50 litas	2013	Lithuanian Presidency of the Council of the European Union
		50 litas	2012	200th anniversary of Baubliai by Dionizas Poška
		50 litas	2012	150th birth anniversary of Maironis
		10 litas (gold)	2012	Lithuanian science
		10 litas	2012	Fine art
		50 litas	2012	Lithuanian nature
		50 litas	2011	150th birth anniversary of writer Gabrielė Petkevičaitė-Bitė
		50 litas (gold)	2011	FIBA EuroBasket 2011
		10 litas	2011	Theater
		50 litas	2011	2012 Summer Olympics
		50 litas	2011	Vilnius Upper Castle
		50 litas	2010	Lithuanian nature
		50 litas	2010	Biržai Castle
		10 litas	2010	Music
		500 litas (gold)	2010	600th anniversary of the Battle of Grunwald
		50 litas	2010	600th anniversary of the Battle of Grunwald
		50 litas	2009	Lithuanian nature
		50 litas	2009	Tytuvėnai architectural ensemble
		100 litas (gold)	2009	1000th anniversary of the name of Lithuania
		50 litas	2009	Vilnius–European Capital of Culture 2009
		50 litas	2008	Lithuanian nature
		100 litas (gold)	2008	1000th anniversary of the name of Lithuania
		50 litas	2008	Silver Coin programme „Europe. European Cultural Heritage“
		50 litas	2008	Kaunas Castle (from the series "Historical and Architectural Monuments of Lithuania")
		50 litas	2008	550th birth anniversary of St. Casimir
		50 litas	2007	2008 Summer Olympics
		100 litas (gold)	2007	1000th anniversary of the name of Lithuania
		50 litas	2007	Panemunė Castle (from the series "Historical and Architectural Monuments of Lithuania")
		10 litas (gold)	2007	International programme "The Smallest Gold Coins of the World. History of Gold"
		50 litas	2006	Uprising of 1831 and the 200th birth anniversary of its heroine Emilija Pliaterytė
		50 litas	2006	Medininkai Castle (from the series "Historical and Architectural Monuments of Lithuania")
		50 litas	2006	Lithuanian nature
		50 litas	2005	The 100th Anniversary of the Great Seimas of Vilnius
		500 litas (gold)	2005	Reconstruction of the Royal Palace of Lithuania
		50 litas	2005	Cardinal Vincentas Sladkevičius (1920–2000)
		50 litas	2005	The 150th anniversary of the National Museum of Lithuania
		50 litas	2005	Kernavė (from the series "Historical and Architectural Monuments of Lithuania")
		50 litas	2004	The Curonian spit (UNESCO World Heritage)
		50 litas	2004	The 475th anniversary of the First Statute of Lithuania
		50 litas	2004	Pažaislis Monastery (from the series "Historical and Architectural monuments of Lithuania")
		50 litas	2004	The 425th anniversary of Vilnius University
		200 litas	2003	The 750th anniversary of the coronation of Mindaugas (see also: Seal of Mindaugas)
		50 litas	2003	Vilnius Cathedral (from the series "Historical and Architectural Monuments of Lithuania")
		50 litas	2003	2004 Summer Olympics
		10 litas	2002	Klaipėda (from the series "Cities of Lithuania")
		5 litas	2002	Lithuanian nature (within the International coin program "Endangered Wildlife")
		50 litas	2002	Trakai Island Castle (from the series "Historical and Architectural Monuments of Lithuania")
		50 litas	2001	The 200th birth anniversary of Motiejus Valančius (1801-1875)
		50 litas	2001	150th birth anniversary of Jonas Basanavičius (1851-1927)
		50 litas	2000	New Millennium
		100 litas (gold)	2000	Vytautas the Great, the Grand Duke of Lithuania (from the series "Rulers of Lithuania")
		50 litas	2000	Vytautas the Great, the Grand Duke of Lithuania (from the series "Rulers of Lithuania")
		50 litas	2000	2000 Summer Olympics
		50 litas	2000	10th anniversary of the reestablishment of independence
		50 litas	2000	350th anniversary of publication "The Great Art of Artillery" by Kazimierz Siemienowicz
		10 litas (gold)	1999	International programme "The Smallest Gold Coins of the World. History of Gold"
		50 litas	1999	Kęstutis, the Grand Duke of Lithuania (from the series "Rulers of Lithuania")
		50 litas	1999	The 10th anniversary of the Baltic Way
		50 litas	1999	Vincas Kudirka (1858-1899)
		10 litas	1999	Kaunas (from the series "Cities of Lithuania")
		5 litas	1998	United Nations Children's Fund (UNICEF) coin program "Children of the World"
		50 litas	1998	Algirdas, the Grand Duke of Lithuania (from the series "Rulers of Lithuania")
		10 litas	1998	Vilnius (from the series "Cities of Lithuania")
		50 litas	1998	200th birth anniversary of Adam Mickiewicz
		1 litas (gold)	1997	The 75th anniversary of the Bank of Lithuania and the litas
		50 litas	1997	The 600th anniversary of the settling down of Karaims and Tatars in Lithuania
		50 litas	1997	The 450th anniversary of Catechism, the first Lithuanian book by Martynas Mažvydas
		50 litas	1996	Gediminas, the Grand Duke of Lithuania (from the series "Rulers of Lithuania")
		50 litas	1996	Mindaugas, the King of Lithuania (from the series "Rulers of Lithuania")
		50 litas	1996	1996 Summer Olympics
		50 litas	1996	January Events of 1991
		50 litas	1995	The 120th birth anniversary of Mikalojus Konstantinas Čiurlionis
		10 litas	1995	The 5th World Lithuanians Sport Games
		50 litas	1995	The 5th anniversary of the reestablishment of independence
		10 litas	1994	World Lithuanians Song Festival
		10 litas	1993	Visit of Pope John Paul II to Lithuania
		10 litas	1993	60th anniversary of the flight across the Atlantic Ocean by Steponas Darius and Stasys Girenas

== Commemorative circulation coins issued 1997–2014 ==
Averse and reverse	Denomination	Year issued	Dedication
	2 litai	2013	Creations of nature and man – Kurenkahn, Puntukas, Stelmužė Oak, Distaff
	1 litas	2013	Presidency of the Council of the European Union
	2 litai	2012	Lithuanian resorts – Birštonas, Druskininkai, Neringa, Palanga
	1 litas	2011	EuroBasket 2011 in Lithuania
	1 litas	2010	600 years for Battle of Grunwald
	1 litas	2009	Vilnius – European Capital of Culture
	1 litas	2005	Reconstruction of the Royal Palace of Lithuania
	1 litas	2004	The 425th anniversary of Vilnius University
	1 litas	1999	The 10th anniversary of the Baltic Way
	1 litas	1997	The 75th anniversary of the Bank of Lithuania and the litas
