= Air Lituanica =

Lithuanian airline

IATA	ICAO	Call sign
LT	LTU	LITUANICA
- Founded: May 2013
- Ceased operations: 22 May 2015
- Hubs: Vilnius Airport
- Fleet size: 4
- Destinations: 10
- Parent company: Start Vilnius (68.7%)
- Headquarters: Vilnius, Lithuania
- Key people: Kęstutis Binkauskas, Chairman; Gytis Gumuliauskas, CEO
- Revenue: €6.8 million (2023)
- Website: airlituanica.com

Air Lituanica was a Lithuanian airline headquartered in Vilnius and based at Vilnius Airport. It ceased operations in May 2015.

== History ==
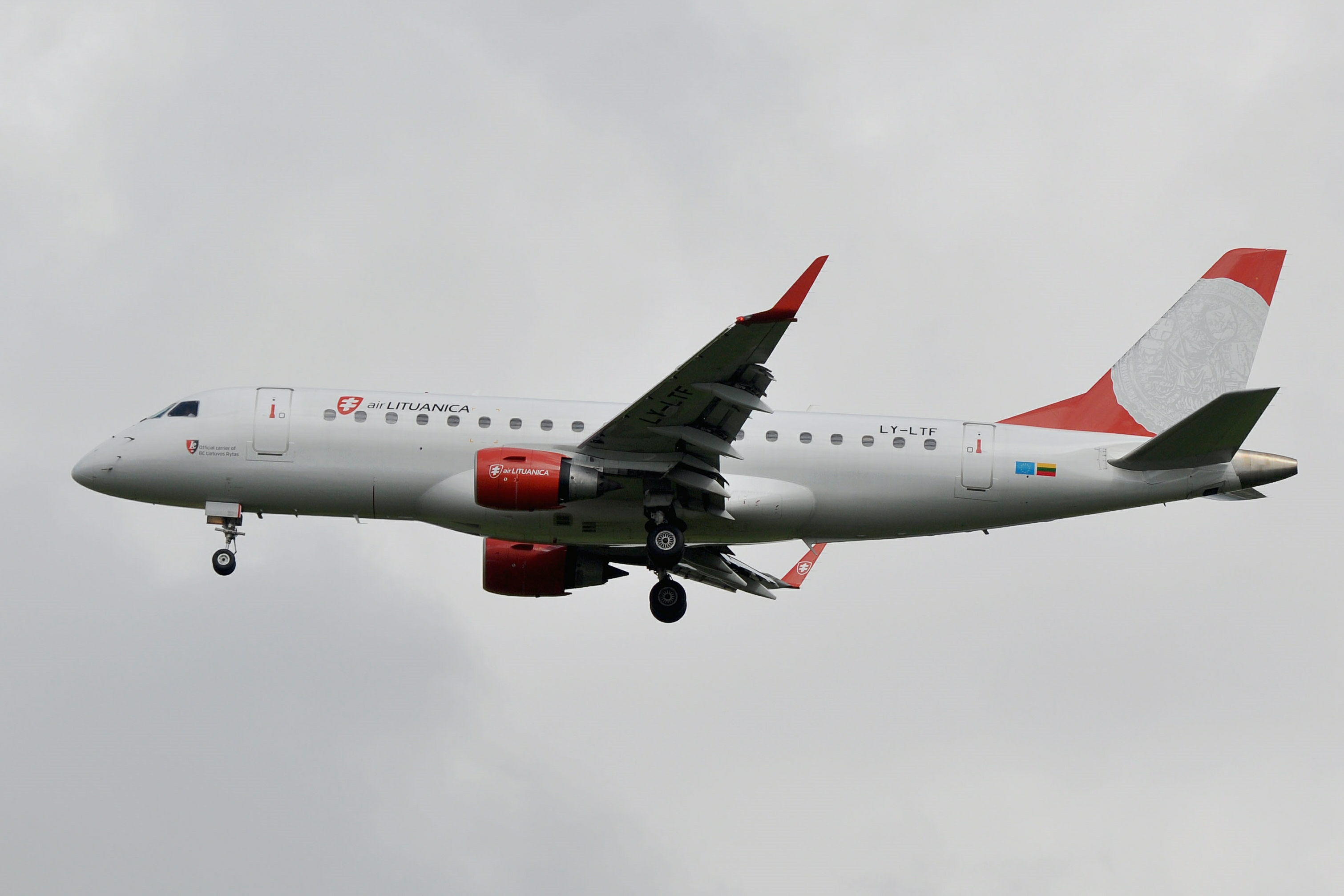
An Embraer 170 in Air Lituanica markings. The carrier deployed an aircraft of the type on the first route served, Vilnius–Brussels.

Air Lituanica was registered in late May 2012. It was named after Lituanica, an aircraft commanded by Steponas Darius and Stasys Girenas, two pioneer Lithuanian pilots that flew it on a transatlantic flight in 1933. The carrier's sole owner, Air Vilnius Group, had an initial investment of LTL0.5 million. Air Vilnius Group was in turn owned by Šiaurės miestelis, which had been registered on 21 May 2012 as a subsidiary of the Vilnius City Municipality. Plans were to collect LTL43.5 million (EUR14 million) from a number of investors for the establishment of the new airline.

Air Lituanica was established in May 2013. The activation of the company was partly accelerated by the fact that Lithuania would take position in the Presidency of the Council of the European Union from 1 July 2013 to 31 December 2013. In May 2013 - when the airline's air operator's certificate had not yet been granted but it already had 27 employees – Air Lituanica announced Brussels as its first destination, with services to start on 30 June 2013.

Air Lituanica launched ticket sales in early June 2013 using Estonian Air's booking channels. Also in early June 2013, the airline signed a contract for the lease through 2015 of an Embraer E-170 from Estonian Air. Air Lituanica received its air operator's certificate on 26 June 2013; and started flight operations four days later, on 30 June 2013, serving the Vilnius–Brussels route with the leased Embraer E-170. Air Lituanica thus became the first Lithuanian scheduled airline to operate since FlyLAL-Lithuanian Airlines and Star1 Airlines ceased operations in 2009 and 2010, respectively.

An 86-seater Embraer E-175 leased from ECC Leasing Company, an Embraer subsidiary, entered Air Lituanica's fleet in July 2013; Embraer handed the aircraft over to Air Lituanica two months later than planned. The carrier started flying its second route, Vilnius–Amsterdam–Vilnius, on 8 July; with its first two routes, the airline contributed 2 percent of the international airline capacity in Lithuania, and at July 2013, the company ranked 9th in terms of available seats to and from Lithuania. It added Berlin Tegel Airport in Berlin, Prague, and Munich to its route network on 5 August, 20 September and 21 September 2013, respectively.

Following allegations of missed payments from both parties, Estonian Air unilaterally terminated its leasing agreement with Air Lituanica for the Embraer E-170 in November 2013 which forced Air Lituanica to end service to Amsterdam and Berlin, the routes on which it used the E-170. Service to Amsterdam ceased on 27 November 2013.

In April 2014, Air Lituanica announced that it would begin flights to Gothenburg and Malmö, Sweden, to be served on a seasonal basis between June and August 2014, and that it would resume flights to Amsterdam.

Air Lituanica ceased flight operations on 22 May 2015. It filed for bankruptcy on 8 June 2015.

== Destinations ==
Air Lituanica served the following destinations:

Country	City	Airport	Begin	End	Refs
Belgium	Brussels	Brussels Airport	30 June 2013	22 May 2015	
Czech Republic	Prague	Prague Václav Havel Airport	20 September 2013	22 May 2015	
Denmark	Billund	Billund Airport	16 June 2014	22 May 2015	
Estonia	Tallinn	Lennart Meri Tallinn Airport	12 March 2014	22 May 2015	
France	Paris	Charles de Gaulle Airport	14 February 2014	22 May 2015	
Germany	Berlin	Berlin Tegel Airport	5 August 2013	22 May 2015	
Germany	Hamburg	Hamburg Airport	30 April 2015	22 May 2015	
Germany	Munich	Munich Airport	21 September 2013	22 May 2015	
Lithuania	Vilnius	Vilnius Airport ^{Hub}	—	—	
Netherlands	Amsterdam	Amsterdam Airport Schiphol	31 August 2014	22 May 2015	
Sweden	Gothenburg	Göteborg Landvetter Airport	16 June 2014	22 May 2015	
Sweden	Malmö	Malmö Airport	17 June 2014	22 May 2015	
Sweden	Stockholm	Bromma Airport	26 January 2015	22 May 2015	

== Fleet ==
At February 2015 the Air Lituanica fleet consisted of a single Embraer 175.

== See also ==
- Transportation in Lithuania
