= Barstyčiai stone =

Biggest erratic stone in Lithuania

Coordinates: 56.192°N 21.8964°E

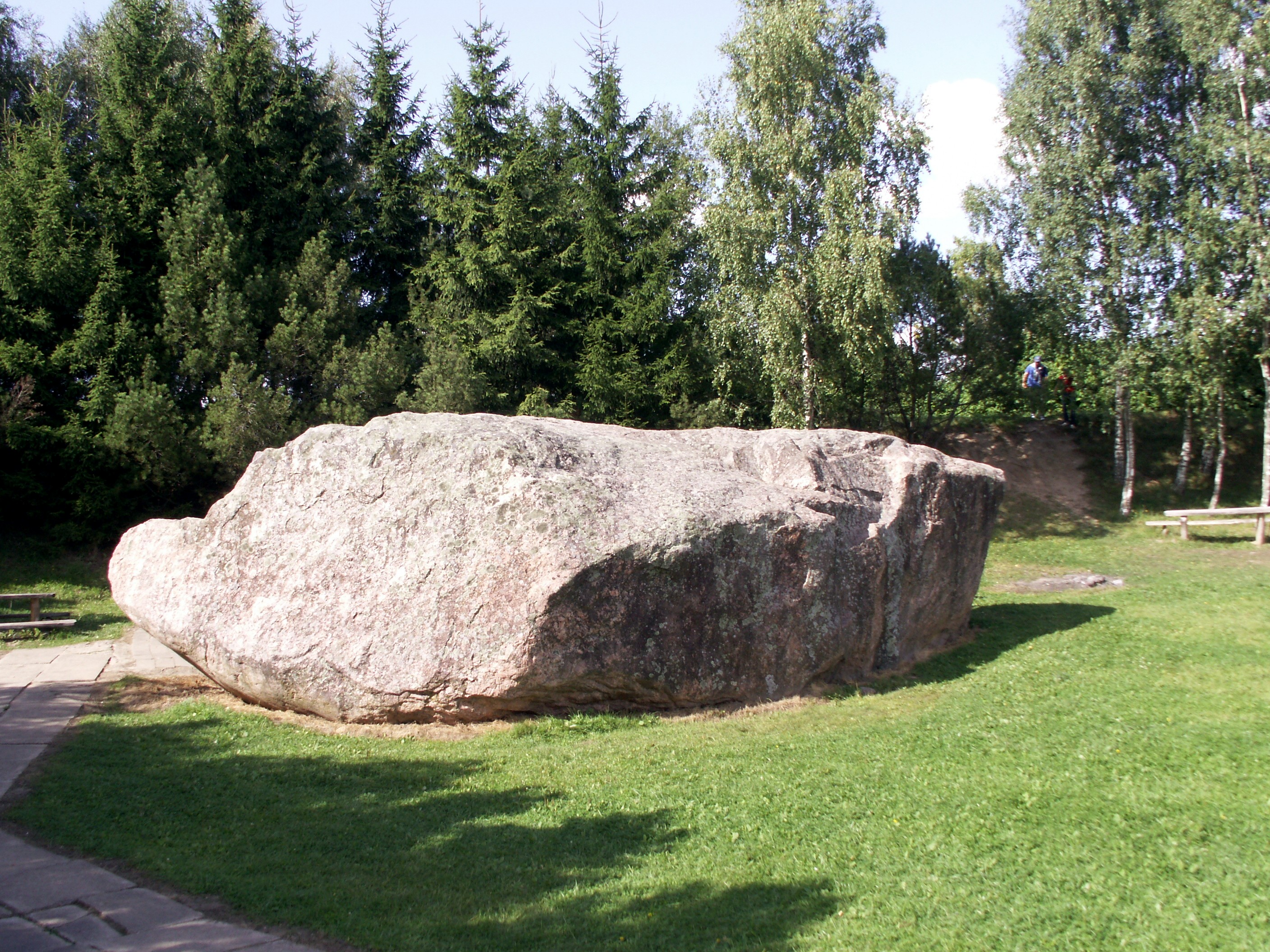
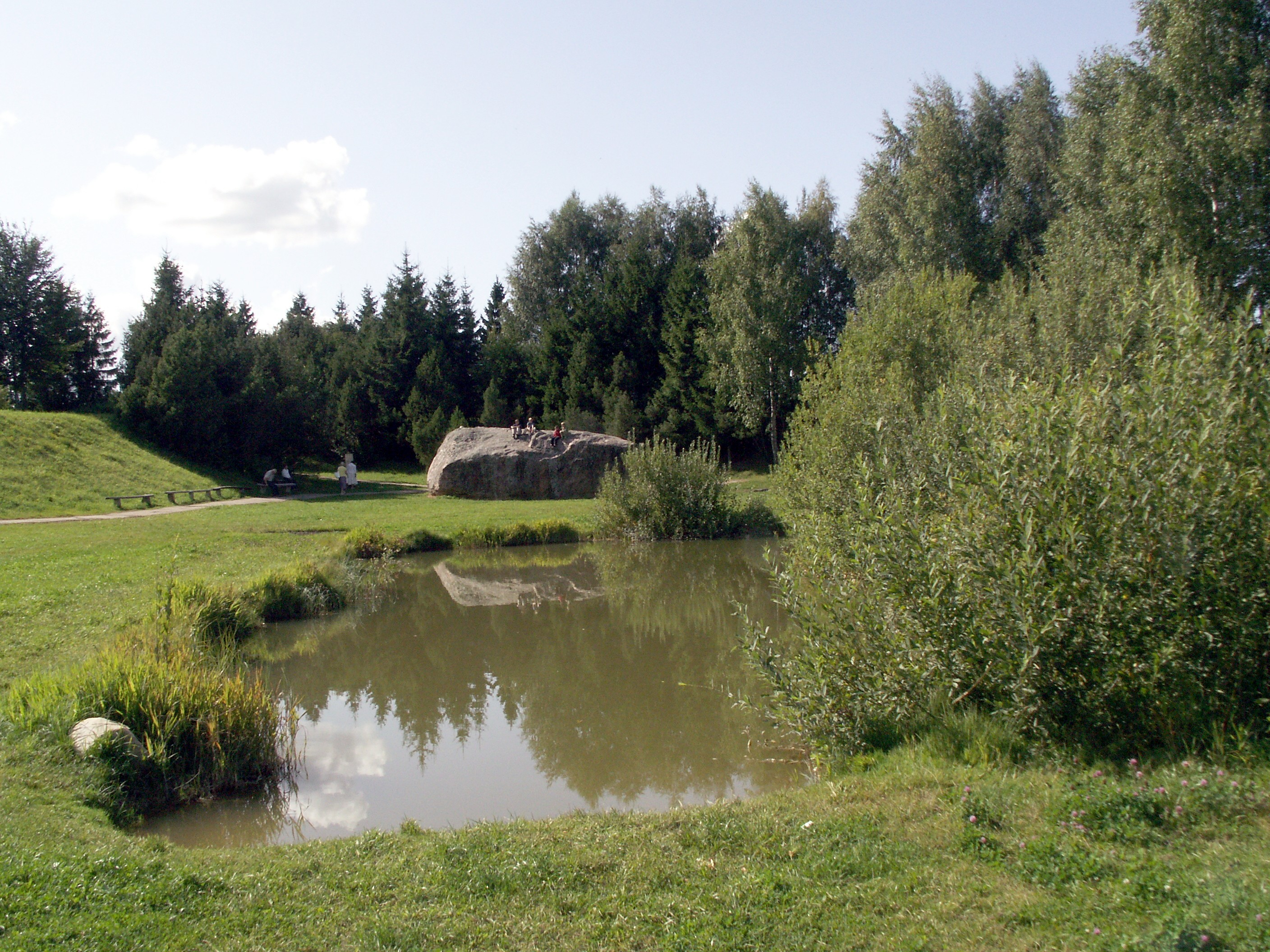
Barstyčiai stone

The Barstyčiai stone (Lithuanian: Barstyčių akmuo), also the Puokė stone (Lithuanian: Puokės akmuo) is the largest boulder in Lithuania, declared a geological monument in 1968. It was found by the village of Puokė, Barstyčiai eldership, Skuodas district in 1957. Length: 13.4 m, height: 3.6 m, width: 7.5 m, weight: estimated 680 tons.

The stone was dragged by a continental glacier from the Fennoscandian rock massif.

== See also ==
- Puntukas, second largest boulder in Lithuania
- List of individual rocks
