= Basketbolo žaidimas (krepšiasvydis) ir Lietuvos sporto lygos oficialės basketbolo taisyklės 1926–27 metams =

- Cover of the book
- Author: Steponas Darius
- Language: Lithuanian
- Subject: Basketball
- Genre: Sports rules book
- Published: 1926
- Publication place: Lithuania
- Pages: 65

Basketbolo žaidimas (krepšiasvydis) ir Lietuvos sporto lygos oficialės basketbolo taisyklės 1926–27 metams is the first rules of basketball book published in Lithuania. It was written by the legendary Lithuanian pilot Steponas Darius, who wished to popularize new sports genres in Lithuania. It is his second book published in Lithuania, followed by the baseball rules book.

== Summary ==
Steponas Darius kept his conception as in his first book. First of all, he describes basketball road in Lithuania as a new sports genre. Brief basketball history in Lithuania is illustrated by six various Lithuanian basketball teams photos. In order to organize bigger progress in basketball, Steponas Darius provides the game technique in which basketball positions are described. He also provided clothing, workouts suggestions in this book part. At the third book part he wrote official basketball rules and answers to commonly asked questions. Book main goal was educational: he was trying to Lithuanize basketball terms, explain basketball goals, advantages and introduce basketball techniques.
