= Marquette Park (Chicago) =

Public park in Chicago, Illinois

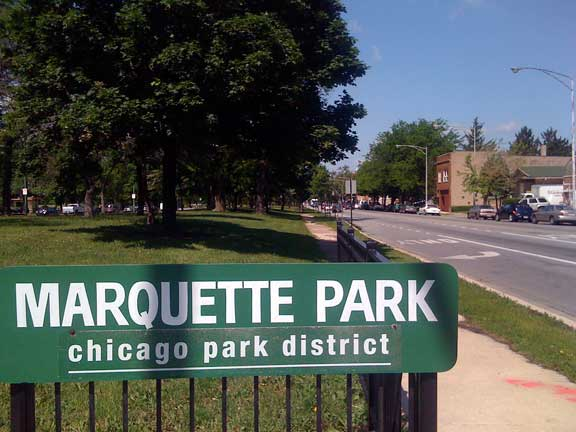
- Marquette Park in Chicago
- Interactive map of Marquette Park
- Location: Chicago Lawn, Chicago, Illinois
- Coordinates: 41.768°N 87.703°W
- Area: 323 acres (1.31 km^{2})
- Operator: Chicago Park District

Marquette Park, the largest park on the southwest side of Chicago, Illinois, at 323 acres (1.31 km^{2}), is located in the city's Chicago Lawn neighborhood. The park is named for Father Jacques Marquette (1637–1675).

== History ==
=== Planning and development ===
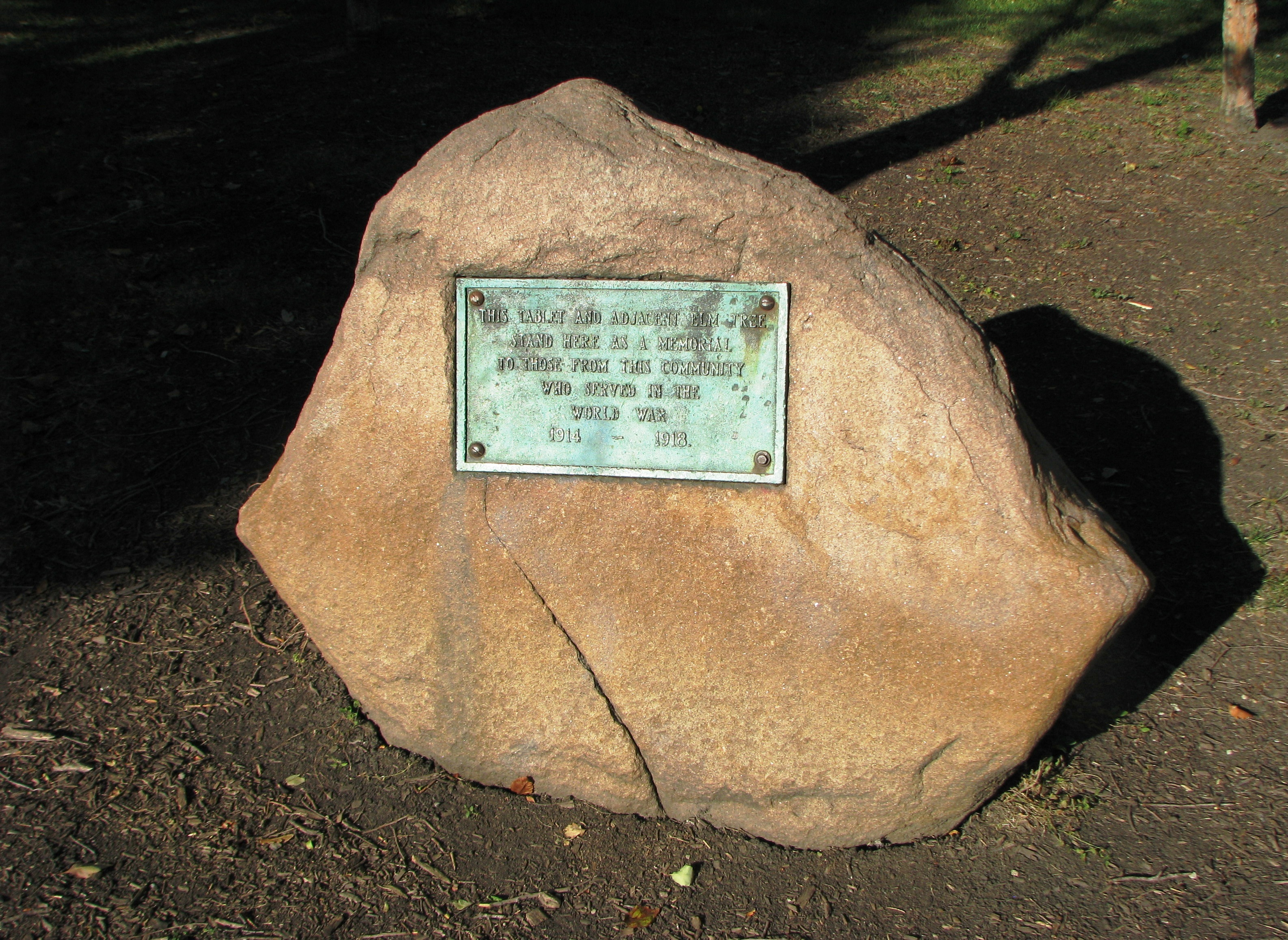
Monument to those who served from the area during World War I

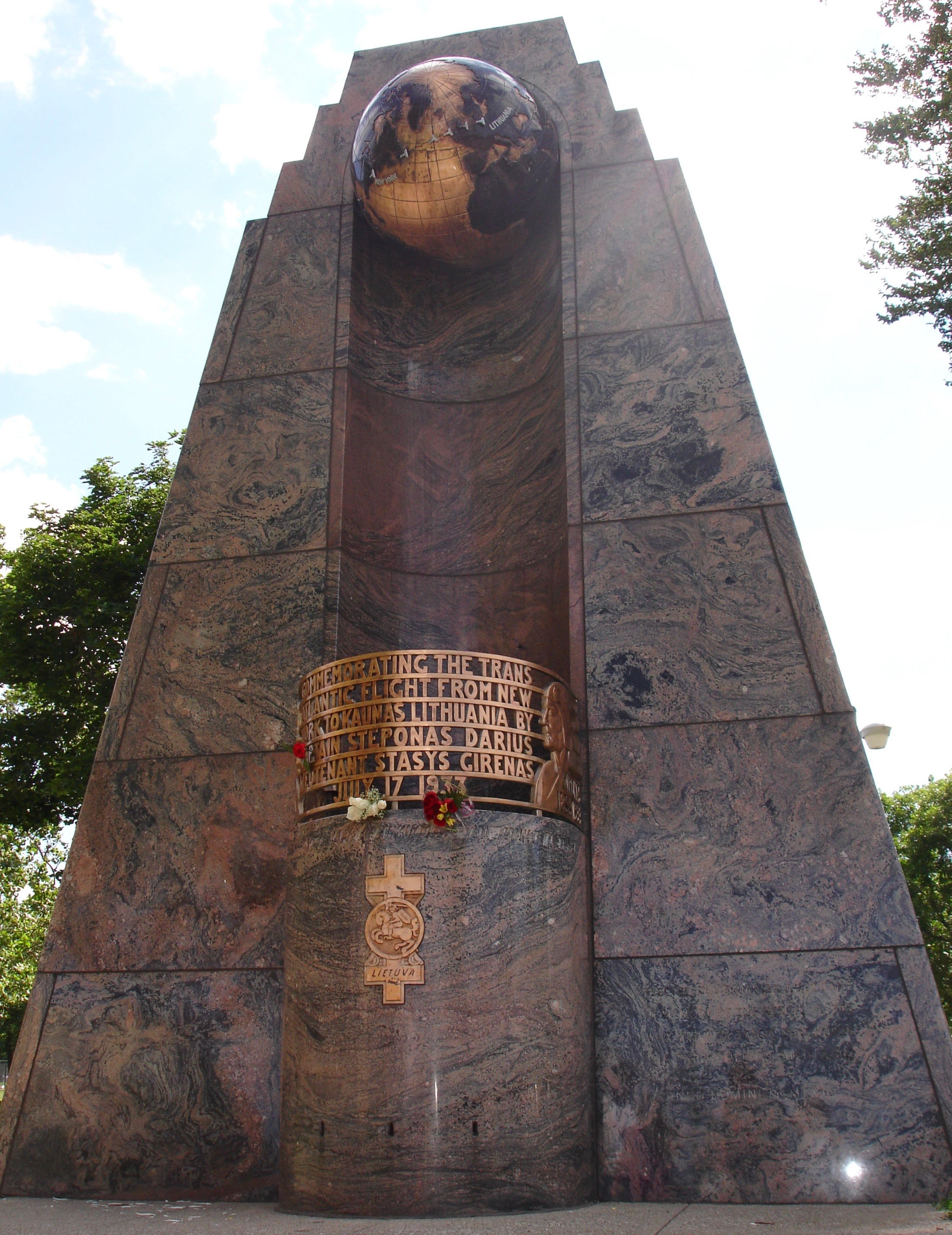
Monument to Darius and Girėnas, pilots of Lituanica

Marquette Park is part of a system of 14 parks designed in 1903 by the Olmsted Brothers. At 323 acres (1.31 km^{2}) in size, it is the largest of the revolutionary neighborhood parks created by the South Park Commission in the early 20th century. The Superintendent at the time, J. Frank Foster, envisioned the "new parks as beautifully landscaped 'breathing spaces' that would provide educational and social services to the city's congested immigrant neighborhoods." "Social reformers launched a playground movement for the creation of additional parks." In 1899 and 1903, the state legislature authorized the three park commissions: Lincoln Park Commission, West Park Commission, and the South Park Commission, to acquire property for new parks. "The South Park Commission opened a system of 10 innovative neighborhood parks in 1905, which soon inspired similar parks in the West and Lincoln Park systems and in other cities across the United States."

The original plans for Marquette Park called for "a golf course on two islands surrounded by naturalistic lagoons; indoor and outdoor gymnasiums; swimming and wading pools; a children's playground; formal gardens; and a concert grove." Due to its size, construction of the park went more slowly than most of the others in the system, and several features of the original plan were dropped due to difficulties with the landscape. Still, in 1913, the 18-hole golf course opened and "by 1917, the park included playing fields, a children's playground, tennis courts, propagating houses for the nursery, and a large, classically-designed golf shelter."

In the early 1930s, the Great Depression caused the bankruptcy of the individual park districts. In 1934, the 22 independent agencies were consolidated into the Chicago Park District. After the consolidation of Chicago's park commissions into the Chicago Park District in 1934, park workers redesigned the golf shelter, built comfort stations, and expanded the walking paths in the park to include the islands.

=== Monuments in the park ===
In 1922, a large granite boulder monument was installed that serves as a memorial to those who served from the area during World War I can be found toward the northwest corner of the park near West Marquette Road (West 67th Street) and South Homan Avenue. Mounted to this boulder is a bronze plaque that reads: "This tablet and adjacent elm tree stand here as a memorial to those from this community who served in the World War 1914 - 1918." As per the Chicago Tribune on page 100 from Sunday, May 14, 1922, the Chicago Lawn Woman's Club was to place this memorial tablet in Marquette Park after their annual luncheon on the afternoon of Tuesday, May 16, 1922, "in memory of those who served in the World War".

In 1935, public support helped secure a statue, located at the northeast corner of the park near West Marquette Road (West 67th Street) and South California Avenue, honoring Lithuanian-American aviators Steponas Darius and Stasys Girėnas who perished during the transatlantic flight of the Lituanica.

In August 1966, Martin Luther King, Jr. was joined by a diverse group of civil rights activists, religious leaders and concerned citizens for a march through Chicago’s Marquette Park neighborhood to demand equal housing. Dr. King called the Marquette Park March, “The first step on a 1,000 mile journey.”

The march was part of a summer long campaign to expose and break the collusion of realtors, city government, and white residents in maintaining tightly controlled racial segregation of housing in Chicago. Similar systems of dual real estate markets, local “covenants” (already declared illegal by the Supreme Court, more than a decade earlier, but still maintained) prevailed in cities and suburbs throughout the north and west, enforcing “de facto” segregation. The Marquette Park march of some 700 people was interrupted and stopped by what can only be called a small-scale riot, during which Dr. King was hit with a rock and other marchers were injured, cars were damaged, and numerous rioters were arrested.

The iconic photos of the event and Dr. King’s international profile guaranteed national coverage of the ugly behavior, making clear that segregation was not a regional southern problem but a national problem (and national embarrassment in the context of the Cold War). The campaign, though it had relatively little near-term impact on segregation in Chicago, led to the passage of a national Fair Housing Act in 1968, only weeks after the assassination of Dr. King in Memphis.

In honor of Dr. King’s work, community groups throughout Chicago developed The Martin Luther King, Jr. Living Memorial project – an effort to recognize the historic importance of Marquette Park March and leverage that moment to energize and inspire the community, which continues the struggle for the justice and equality that Dr. King sought a half-century ago.

The Memorial consists of three, 4-sided steles made from nearly 800 over-sized bricks and limestone – a reference to the construction materials of Chicago bungalows. Each stele’s inner face carries text telling about the historic importance of the Fair Housing Movement and the Martin Luther King Jr. Living Memorial. The site includes a bench containing nearly 300 tiles created by Chicagoans of all ages representing their understanding of “Home”, and representations of the diverse community of people who today continue to work to advance Dr. King’s vision.

The steles are made of carved brick that depict the history and possible positive futures of the neighborhood and positive aspects of the present. Images on one side show Martin Luther King Jr. and marchers with arms linked in the manner typical of The Civil Rights era and an iconic image of a moment immediately after Dr. King was struck by a projectile. Another side represents the beloved community Dr. King imagined and called on us all to create – a future in which all humans – regardless of gender, race, or nationality – have a secure home.

The Memorial also has the word “Home” written in different languages historic to Marquette Park and to the global world we live in today.

=== Protests ===
Marquette Park and the neighborhood surrounding it became infamous for being the scene many violent, racially charged rallies between the 1960s and 1980s.

==== Civil rights protests ====
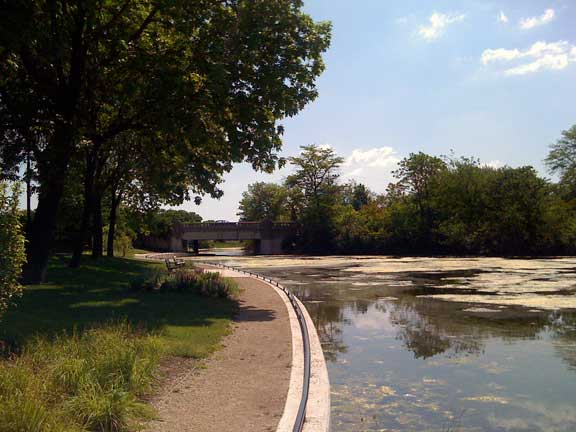
Marquette Park Lagoon

The Southern Christian Leadership Conference, chaired by Dr. Martin Luther King Jr., decided to take its protest north in 1966. During the Chicago Freedom Movement, King led a group of marchers (protesters) into the all-white housing areas near Marquette Park in Chicago. A crowd of 4,000 Marquette Park residents gathered to watch the march, some waving Confederate flags or throwing bottles, bricks and rocks at the protesters. One of the rocks hit King in the head above his right ear, but he was not severely hurt and continued with the march. The Marquette Park residents also stoned cars and buses carrying black people and, after the march, clashed with police. It is a common misconception that the incident in which Dr. King was struck with a rock happened in the Chicago suburb of Cicero rather than Marquette Park, but the Chicago Freedom Movement never marched in Cicero.

The incident at Marquette Park was part of the protests led by the Chicago Freedom Movement, of which King was co-chairman. It was a year-long campaign for open housing, started in January 1966 when King and his wife Coretta moved into a North Lawndale slum on the west side of Chicago. King, the SCLC, and the movement wanted to make Chicago a racially open city. They wanted it to be a place where everyone could buy homes or rent apartments without fear of racial attacks. The march was not as successful as King and the SCLC had hoped. A rather vague agreement was created with Chicago Mayor Richard J. Daley, containing promises (not kept) of open housing legislation and improving living conditions. This march was part of a series of marches coordinated by the Chicago Freedom Movement—the marriage of King's SCLC and the CCCO (Coordinating Council of Chicago Organizations), led by King's co-leader in Chicago, Al Raby.

In 2016, a memorial to Martin Luther King Jr. was erected in the park.

==== Neo-Nazi protests ====
In the 1970s, National Socialist Party of America leader Frank Collin regularly held demonstrations in the park. After the Chicago Park District banned Collin, he instead proposed a march in the largely Jewish suburb of Skokie. A Supreme Court decision, National Socialist Party of America v. Village of Skokie, ordered the march to be allowed on First Amendment grounds.

To avoid a violent confrontation with the Jewish Defense League, the ACLU negotiated a compromise where the NSPA would not march in Skokie but instead Chicago would allow the group to return to the park.

=== Plane crash ===
On the afternoon of Friday, December 8, 1972, United Airlines Flight 553 crashed two blocks west of the park into a residential area, killing 43 on board and two on the ground. The Boeing 737-222 was on approach to Midway Airport and the crash was attributed to pilot error; there were eighteen survivors, including all three flight attendants. Among the fatalities were congressman George W. Collins and CBS News correspondent Michele Clark.

== Description and surroundings ==
=== Ashburn Prairie ===
Marquette Park's three and a half acre Ashburn prairie remnant has a very special history. The story begins during the pre-settlement era at 87th Street and Kedzie Avenue on a 2-acre (8,100 m^{2}) lot near the Evergreen Cemetery. It was at this location that the original Ashburn prairie thrived, untouched by farming, housing and commercial development. The mesic prairie contained nearly 100 species of native plants. Forbs such as Mountain Mint (Pycanthemum verticillatum), Nodding Wild Onion (Allium cernuum), Nodding Ladies’ Tresses (Spiranthes cernua), Purple Coneflower (Echinacea purpurea), Black-eyed Susan (Rudbeckia hirta), Prairie Dock (Silphium perfoliatum), Compass Plant (Silphium lacinatum), and Obedient-plant (Physostegia virginiana) were found at the prairie. Grasses such as Big Bluestem (Andropogon gerardi) and Indian grass (Sorghastrum nutans) were also present.

Looming land development threatened the rare patch of prairie, but a heroic effort by the Park District and members of the public resulted in the prairie being moved to Marquette Park. In the spring in 1993, the Park District dug up several plugs of prairie using a tree spade. Each plug measured four to five feet across. With the important roots of these prairie plant plugs intact, crews carefully transported these huge plugs to Marquette Park. There, the rescue team drilled holes and installed the huge plugs near the edge of the lagoon. Fortunately, the soil profile at the old site was similar to the soil profile at the new site, and overall the prairie rescue was a success. Most of the flowers bloomed the very first year in their new home. As the prairie began to settle into its new home, prairie reconstruction activities continued. Volunteers seeded, planted and weeded between the tree-spaded remnants, and in the areas north of the remnants.

The prairie is located along the edge of the lagoon, south of Mann St., east of Kedzie Avenue.

=== Golf Course ===
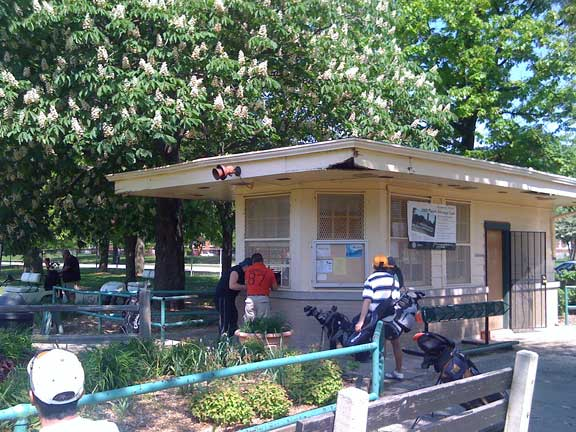
Marquette Park Golf Club House, Chicago

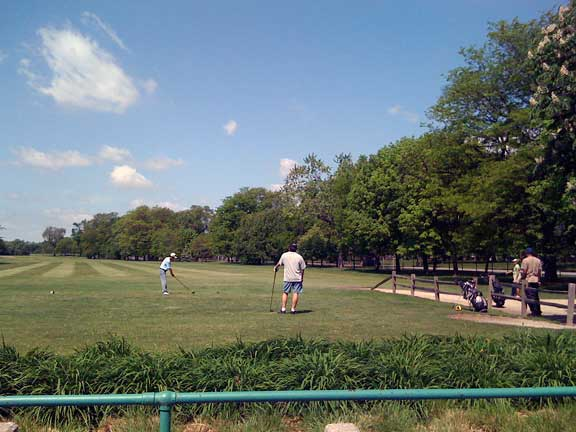
Marquette Park Golf Course, Hole 1

The Marquette Park Golf Course is a 3,187-yard (2,914 m) nine-hole par-36 course featuring elevated tees and greens as well as spacious fairways. Water comes into play on seven of the nine golf holes. The golf course practice facilities include a driving range, a 9,000-square-foot (840 m^{2}) putting green, and chipping green and sand bunkers. Billy Casper Golf serves as manager of the Marquette Park Golf Course as it does for all Chicago Park District golf facilities.

=== Tarkington Elementary School ===
The Tarkington Elementary School, located at 3330 W. 71st Street on the south side of the park and serving pre-K through the 8th grade, was completed in 2005 and classes began on Tuesday, October 4 of that year. Tarkington is the first in the Chicago Public Schools system to have the U.S. Green Building Council's LEED certification. With a building area approximately 134,000 square feet (12,400 m^{2}), the school sits on a 9.82-acre (39,700 m^{2}) site. The school was built to relieve overcrowding on the Southwest Side and will serve up to 1,000 elementary school students.

The two-story elementary school include art, music and science classrooms, a full-serving kitchen and dining facilities, a multipurpose room and a field house that will be shared by the Chicago Park District. The project also involved improvements to Marquette Park, including a new soccer field.

== Facilities ==
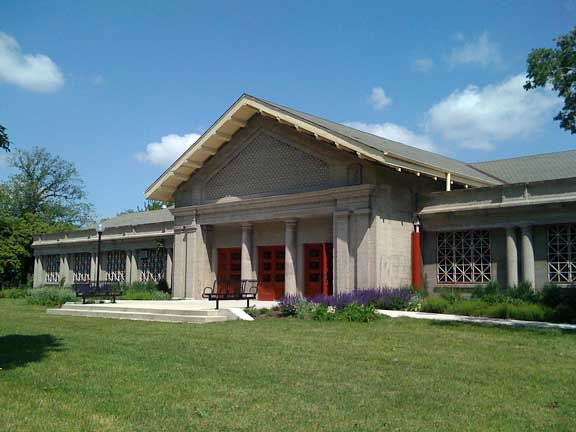
Marquette Park Field House

- Competitive Cheerleading
- Basketball team
- Auditoriums
- Baseball
- Basketball Courts
- Community Garden
- Golf Course
- Gyms
- Meeting Rooms/Assembly Halls
- Men's and/or Women's Locker Rooms/Showers
- Parking Lots
- Paths (Jogging/Walking/Bicycling)
- Soccer Fields Marquette F.C.
- Tennis Courts
