= Česlovas Gedgaudas =

Lithuanian pseudohistorian (1909 –1986)

- Born: February 2, 1909; Kaunas, Kovno Governorate, Russian Empire
- Died: July 19, 1986 (aged 77); Los Angeles, California, United States
- Education: University of Paris
- Occupations: Diplomat, translator
- Notable work: In the Search of Our Past

Česlovas Gedgaudas (also known as Chester Gegaudas, February 2, 1909 – July 19, 1986) was a Lithuanian diplomat, translator, polyglot, and amateur historian. He is best known for his pseudohistorical book In the Search for Our Past, in which he promoted the claims of Jurate Rosales and Aleksandras Račkus that the Goths and Vandals were Baltic peoples, and not Germanic or Slavic.

== Biography ==
Gedgaudas was born to the noble house of Gedgaudai. His father, Mykolas "Mikas" Gedgaudas, was an artillery commander who participated in the Lithuanian Wars of Independence.

Gedgaudas attended and graduated from the Institute of Political Science at the University of Paris. He later worked at the Ministry of Foreign Affairs of Lithuania and the Lithuanian delegation in Rome. From 1945 to 1952, he lived in Paris, working as a translator at the Ministry of Foreign Affairs in France. During these years, he expanded his knowledge of Indo-European languages at the Sorbonne (Gedgaudas wrote that he knew fourteen languages, nine of them classical). He was writing his doctoral thesis on comparative linguistics, but it was never finished.

Gedgaudas moved to the United States in 1952, living in Chicago and California.

== Works ==
Gedgaudas' best-known work is the book In the Search for Our Past (Lithuanian: Mūsų praeities beieškant), first published in 1972 in Mexico City, and then republished in Lithuania in 1994 and 2018. In it, Gedgaudas talks about his theory that the Balts, or Lithuanians, inhabited a large part of Europe, and that the Goths, Vandals and Veneti were actually a Baltic people. To prove his theory, he compared a set of words and place names in different languages. It is considered a pseudohistoric work, and the linguist Zigmas Zinkevičius classifies Gedgaudas, Jurate Rosales and Aleksandras Račkus as being in the same school of thought.
