= Feliksas Vaitkus =

American-born Lithuanian pilot

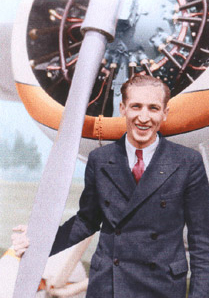
- Born: June 20, 1907; Chicago, Illinois, United States
- Died: July 25, 1956 (aged 49); Wiesbaden, West Germany
- Education: University of Chicago
- Spouse: Marta Brotz
- Awards: Order of Vytautas the Great, III class (1935)
- Aviation career
- Air force: United States Army Air Corps; United States Army Air Forces; United States Air Force
- Battles: World War II; Korean War
- Rank: Lieutenant colonel

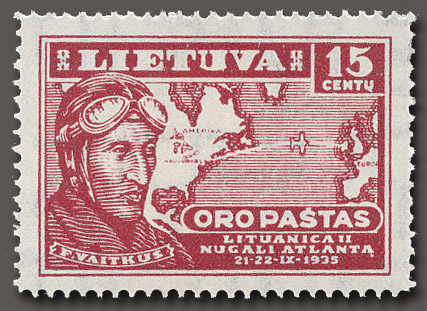
Lithuanian postage stamp dedicated to Lituanica II flight (1936)

Feliksas Vaitkus (1907–1956), also known as Felix Waitkus, was an American-born Lithuanian pilot and the sixth pilot to fly solo across the Atlantic.

== Biography ==
His parents came from Lithuania in 1904, settling in the old "Lithuanian Downtown" in Chicago's Bridgeport neighborhood where Vaitkus was born three years later. He enlisted in the U.S. Army in 1928, and after graduating from advanced pilot’s training school, was commissioned a second lieutenant in the Air Corps. In 1931, he was placed in the reserves with the rank of first lieutenant and returned to civilian life to work with his father-in-law who operated a flying school in Kohler, Wisconsin.

== Lituanica II ==
A few months after the Lituanica tragedy, some prominent members of the Chicago Lithuanian community discussed the possibility of financing another transatlantic flight. This idea was greeted with much enthusiasm, and enough funds were raised during this difficult period, the Great Depression. A much faster and more modern aircraft (compared to the original Lituanica) was purchased from the Lockheed Aircraft Corp., called the Lockheed Vega, the same model used by Wiley Post in his round-the-world flight, and by Amelia Earhart, the first woman to fly solo across the Atlantic.

The aircraft was christened Lituanica II on Sunday, April 22, 1934. When the pilot originally chosen for the flight unexpectedly resigned in the spring, the Lithuanian organizers turned to Feliksas Vaitkus, and he accepted the challenge to fly to Lithuania.

The original flight date was postponed to 1935 because modifications were needed to strengthen the aircraft's structure due to the installation of extra fuel tanks and a more powerful engine. New equipment was added, which Darius and Girėnas did not have, such as a variable-pitch propeller to improve engine performance and a radio compass. Lituanica II was test-flown extensively to ensure its success.

== Flight ==
Vaitkus arrived at Floyd Bennett Field in New York in May 1935. That year, prior to his arrival, no pilots had been able to fly over the Atlantic due to poor weather conditions, and so he had to wait until the chief meteorologist gave him a favorable weather report. It was not until four months later, on the evening of September 20, he was informed that the weather along his route had improved, where conditions were average, with no major changes expected in the next 24 hours. Encouraged with this news, Vaitkus decided to fly. He carried five ham and egg sandwiches, a quart of coffee and lemonade, fruit, plus two gallons of water. One thousand letters were onboard too to be delivered to Lithuania, and ribbons from Lithuanian-Americans of Chicago for the graves of Steponas Darius and Stasys Girėnas.

The next day, September 21, at 6:45 in the morning, Lituanica II was headed for Europe. Unfortunately, Vaitkus had to fight the worst possible weather conditions, flying through rain, fog, and icing, so that most of his navigation had to be by his new radio compass. More than once he noticed ice forming on the wings and had to descend to a lower altitude until it thawed off. Vaitkus was helped considerably by hourly broadcasts from an Irish radio station. He learned that Dublin was fogged in, as well as all areas heading east as far as the Baltic Sea. He knew that he could not make it to Kaunas due to his low fuel supply, and being exhausted after a 23-hour struggle fighting the elements, he felt it was best to come down somewhere in Ireland.

He spotted an open field in Cloongowla at Ballinrobe, County Mayo and landed there, with the aircraft suffering extensive damage. He was lucky to be alive and uninjured. Lituanica II was crated for shipment to Lithuania, where it would be restored. By ship and by train he made his way to Kaunas where he was given a hero’s welcome.

Feliksas Vaitkus was the only pilot to fly across the North Atlantic in 1935, and even though he landed in Ireland and not in Kaunas, he was entered in aviation’s history books for being the sixth pilot to fly solo across the Atlantic.

He was recalled to active duty in the Army Air Corps in 1940, serving as the chief test pilot at the Boeing Aircraft Co. in Seattle, testing hundreds of B-17 and B-29 bombers. He was recalled again to serve in the U.S. Air Force during the Korean War.

He died of a heart attack while stationed at Wiesbaden, Germany, on July 25, 1956, at the age of 49. His body was shipped home and interred in his wife’s family plot in the Kohler Cemetery at Sheboygan, Wisconsin. At the time of his death, he held the rank of lieutenant colonel.

== Legacy and commemoration ==
Lituanica II remains an important symbol of Lithuanian aviation history and transatlantic flight.

A monument dedicated to Feliksas Vaitkus and his transatlantic flight on Lituanica II stands in Ballinrobe, County Mayo, Ireland. The monument includes a scaled replica of the Lockheed L-5B Vega aircraft and a commemorative plaque honoring the pilot. The project was initiated and led by Dainius Čepaitis as part of efforts to preserve the memory of Feliksas Vaitkus’ flight and to promote Lithuanian-Irish cultural cooperation.

The monument was unveiled with the participation of representatives of Lithuania and Ireland, including officials, members of the Lithuanian community and local authorities of County Mayo. Commemorative events are held annually at the monument, organized by LABAS in cooperation with the Embassy of Lithuania in Ireland and supported by members of the Lithuanian community and local partners.
