= Puntukas =

Second-largest boulder after Barstyčiai boulder in Lithuania

Coordinates: 55°29′3″N 25°3′31″E

Puntukas Dvaronių akmuo
- Glacial erratic
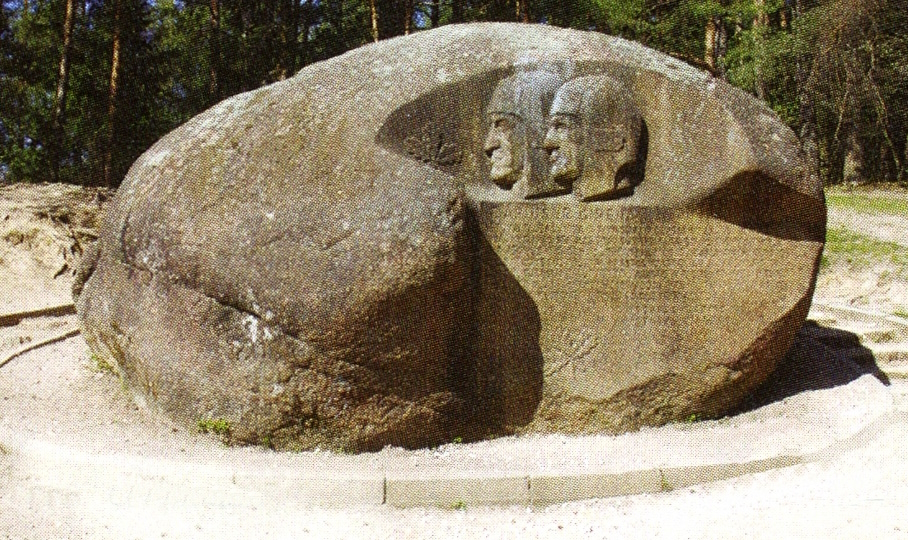
- Puntukas with a bas-relief of pilots Darius and Girėnas and an excerpt from their will

- Location within Lithuania
- Coordinates
- Location: Dvaronys, near Anykščiai
- Geology: Glacial erratic

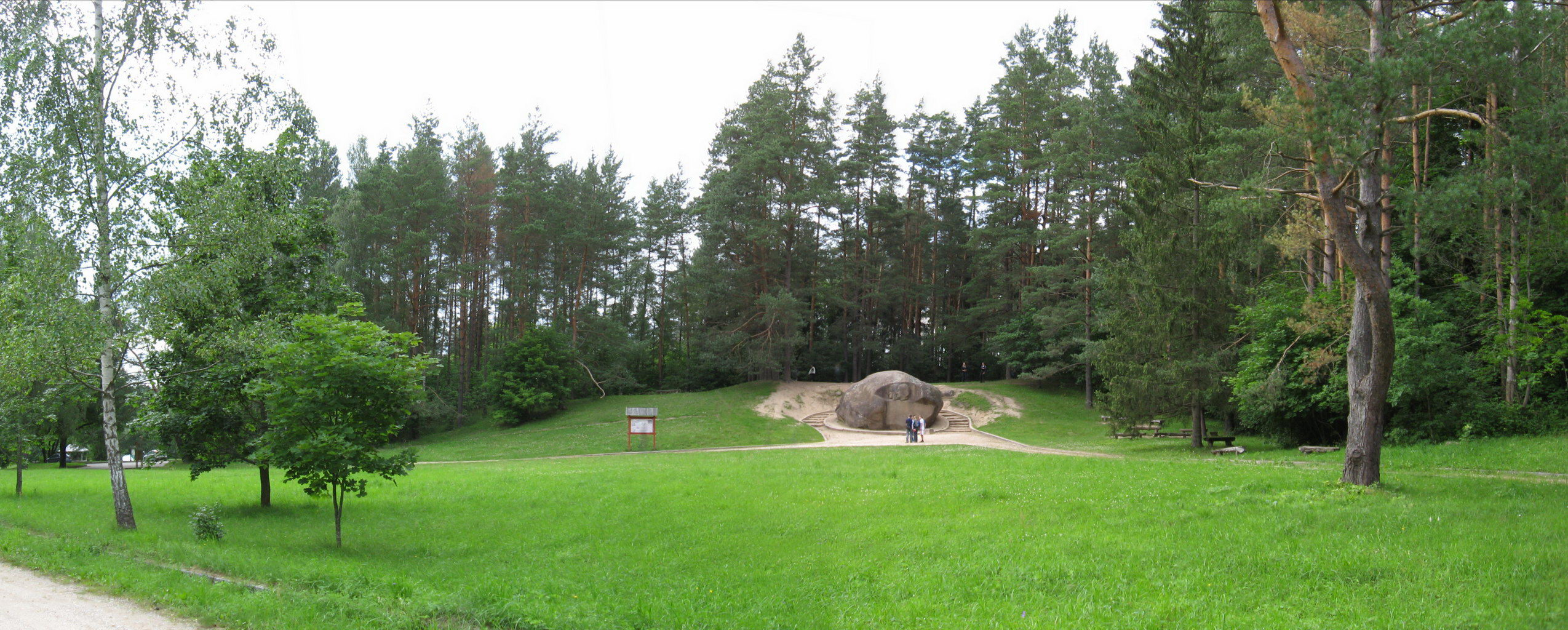
Puntukas stone from a far

Puntukas also known as Dvaronys Stone is the second-largest boulder in Lithuania, a natural monument of the state. It is situated some 5 kilometres (3.1 mi) south of Anykščiai on the left bank of the Šventoji River. Next to Puntukas, the treetop trail of Anykščiai Pine Forest is arranged. It was believed to be the largest stone in Lithuania until the discovery of Barstyčiai stone in the Skuodas district in 1957.

== Physical characteristics ==
Puntukas is a glacial erratic—it was brought by glaciers during the last glacial period (18th–12th millennium BC) probably from Finland. It measures 6.9 metres (23 ft) in length, 6.7 m (22 ft) in width, and 5.7 m (19 ft) in depth (including 1.5 m (4 ft 11 in) underground). It weighs about 446 tons according to the latest data. It is made of Rapakivi granite. Its reddish mass includes large crystals of potassium feldspar surrounded by green rings of oligoclase.

== Sculpture ==
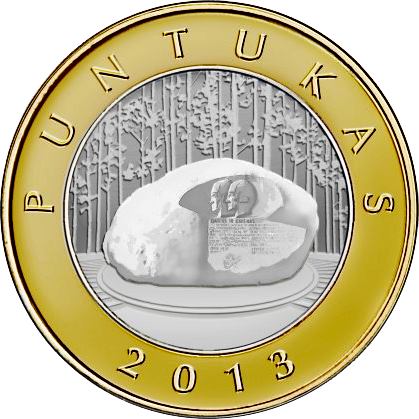
A commemorative 2013 2 litai coin

On the southern face of the Puntukas stone is a bas-relief memorializing the pioneering Lithuanian aviators Steponas Darius and Stasys Girėnas. The idea for the monument was conceived by Tomas Algirdas Zauka. Measuring 1.17 by 1.44 meters, the carving was created in secret in 1943 by sculptor Bronius Pundzius during the Nazi occupation of Lithuania to mark the 10th anniversary of the pilots' historic flight. The sculpting process took about 180 days. It features portraits of the pilots bordered by oak branch motifs. Beneath the figures are their surnames, the date of their flight (July 15, 1933), and an excerpt from their final testament, an appeal to the Lithuanian nation written before their ill-fated transatlantic journey from New York City to Kaunas aboard the Lituanica. The memorial was heavily damaged by gunfire from Soviet Extermination battalions in 1945 but was eventually restored in the mid-1970s. Following the second Soviet occupation of Lithuania, Tomas Algirdas Zauka was arrested by the Soviets for organizing the construction of the unauthorized memorial to Darius and Girėnas. Consequently, he was deported to the Gulag labor camps.

== Local legends ==
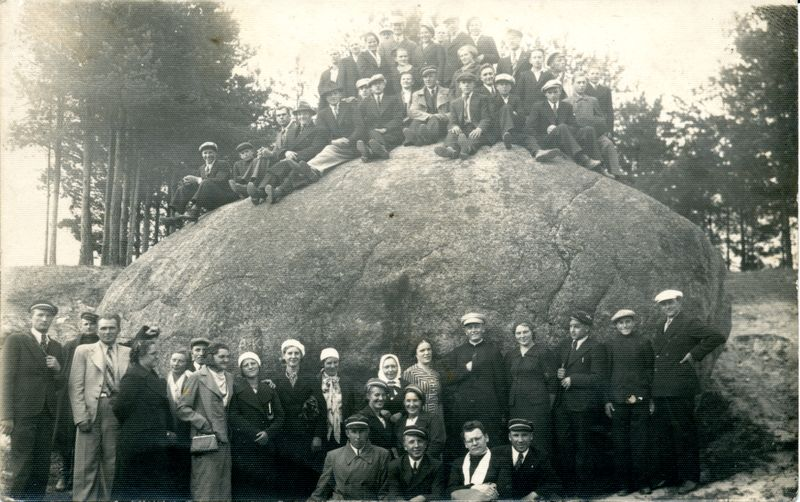
Pavasarininkai at Puntukas in 1938

A local legend has it that velnias (devil in the Lithuanian mythology) carried the stone to destroy the Anykščiai Church, however a rooster crowed. The devil disappeared back into the underworld, leaving only Puntukas behind. The legend was featured in the famous poem Anykščių šilelis by Antanas Baranauskas.

According to another story, a brave Lithuanian warrior Puntukas was killed and was burned (a usual pagan custom) on the stone; since then it is known as Puntukas stone. Other legends claim that the stone was a pagan shrine or altar and that oaks growing around are relics of the sacred groves.
