= Anortė Mackelaitė =

Lithuanian artist

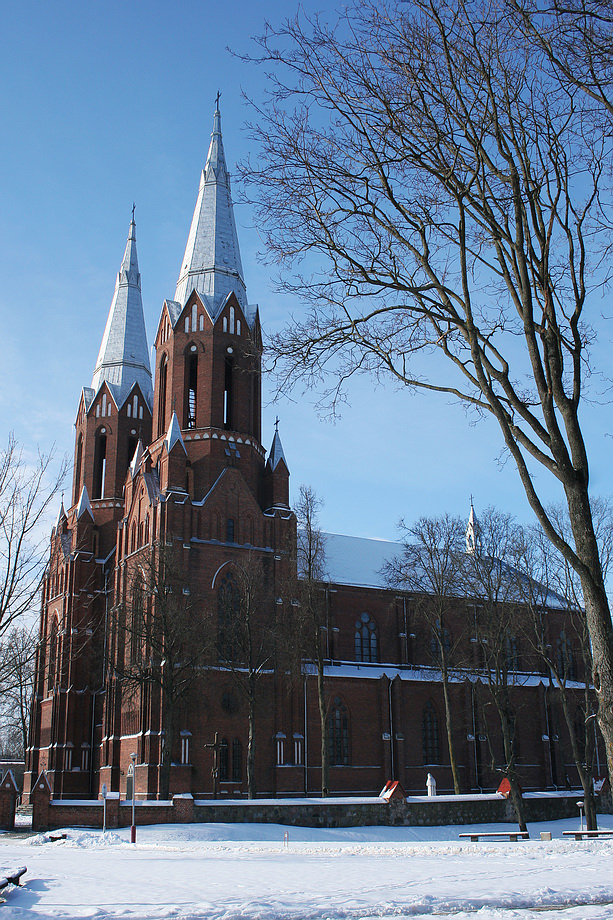
Anykščiai Church

Marija Anortė Mackelaitė, better known as Anortė Mackelaitė, (born 14 October 1930 in Kėdainiai) is a Lithuanian stained glass artist. Along with stained-glass artists such as Stasys Ušinskas, Algimantas Stoškus, Kazimieras Morkūnas, Antanas Garbuskas, Filomena Ušinskaitė, Konstantinas Šatūnas and Bronius Bružas, she has been cited as one of the leading artists in this field in Lithuania and the Baltic States. Her best-known work is the brightly colored stained-glass windows which she contributed to Anykščiai Church, the tallest church in Lithuania.

== Biography ==
In 1949–1951, Mackelaitė studied at the Kaunas Institute of Applied Decorative Art, and in 1955 at the Lithuanian Institute of Fine Arts. In 1956–1957, she became a school teacher in Kėdainiai. Since 1957 she has participated in exhibitions and has been the creator of ornamental stained glass. Her works are characterized by a harmonious composition, with ornamental strip line design, often combining bright with contrasting or moderate colors. In 1968 she designed the windows to the Klaipėda Cultural Palace and in the late 1960s also designed windows in the spa town of Druskininkai. Between 1970 and 1985, she worked on the Anykščiai Church, the tallest church in Lithuania where she designed the brightly colored stained glass windows. She designed the window in the entrance hall of the Čiurlionis School of Art (1962) and the booths in the Aušrinė Cafe (1972). In the Vasara restaurant in Palanga, she innovatively used decorative properties of facet glass by utilizing it to face the walls.

== Bibliography ==
- Ramanauskaitė, Liudvika (1979). Igor Bartenev (ed.). Modern Lithuanian stained glass. Leningrad: Aurora Art. OCLC 223346676.
