= Lituanica =

Transatlantic Bellanca CH-300 Pacemaker (1933)

Coordinates: 52°51′11.57″N 14°50′17.78″E

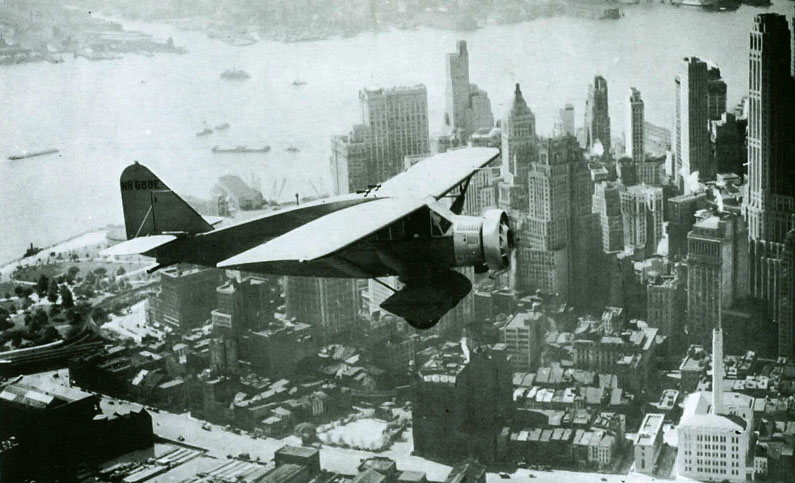
- Lituanica above New York in 1933

General information
- Type: Bellanca CH-300
- Manufacturer: Bellanca (rebuild for transatlantic flight in the E. M. Laird workshops)
- Construction number: 137
- Registration: NR-688E

History
- First flight: 1929
- Preserved at: Vytautas the Great War Museum (wreckage); Lithuanian Aviation Museum (replica)
- Fate: crashed in Kuhdamm near Soldin, Germany (now Pszczelnik, near Myślibórz, Poland)

Lituanica was a Bellanca CH-300 Pacemaker airplane flown from the United States across the Atlantic Ocean by Lithuanian pilots Steponas Darius and Stasys Girėnas in 1933. After successfully flying 6,411 km (4,043 miles), it crashed, due to undetermined circumstances, 650 km (404 miles) from its destination, Kaunas, Lithuania.

== The aircraft ==
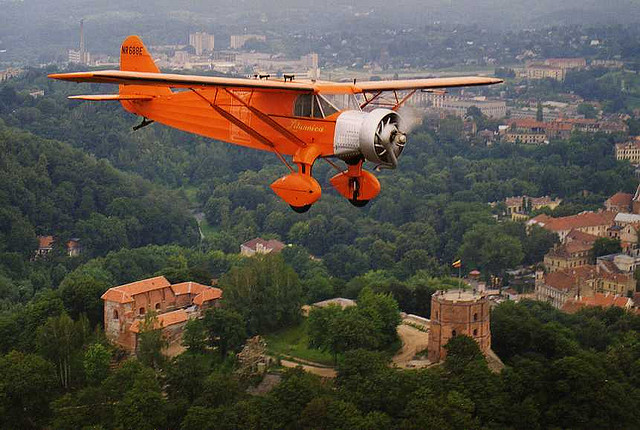
Replica of Lituanica above Vilnius in 1993

On June 18, 1932, the pilots purchased the Pacemaker airplane, serial no. 137, registered as NC-688E, from the Pal-Waukee Company for $3,200. First produced and flown in 1929, forty units of the CH-300 Pacemaker were eventually built. It was a single-engine, six-seat, high-wing monoplane. The fuselage was welded chromoly steel tubing covered with fabric. The cabin interior was covered with a sound-absorbing material. The fuselage had side and top windows, with doors on both sides. The wings were of wooden construction, with two spars, also fabric-covered. The spars and ribs were made of spruce strips and plywood. The wings had two gasoline tanks with a total capacity of 88 US gal (330 L). Wing struts were 2/3 wood, 1/3 steel (at the wings) with aero-dynamic steel ribs, fabric-covered, giving an additional 47 ft² (4.4 m²) lifting surface. Tail surfaces were made of welded steel tubing. The horizontal stabilizer was of spruce strips and plywood, with the trim-angle adjustable in flight. The landing gear was a curved steel bar with rubber rope suspension. Wheels 30 × 5 inches (762 by 127 mm). The engine was a Wright J6, radial, air cooled, 9 cylinders, 300 hp (225 kW). Funds for the plane was raised from numerous Lithuanian clubs and organizations, including air shows.

On January 20, 1933, the aircraft was moved to E. M. Laird workshops at 5321 W. 65th St. in the Clearing Industrial District, Chicago, where she was rebuilt and outfitted for the transatlantic flight. New elongated wings were built, with two additional gasoline tanks installed in the fuselage, having 220 US gal (830 L) and 185 US gal (700 L) capacity, each equipped with emergency dump valves. Beneath the pilot's seat a 25 US gal (95 L) oil tank was outfitted with 12 cooling tubes. A longer horizontal stabilizer was built. Aero-dynamic wheel fairings were installed, and the fuselage received a new fabric covering. A new, higher compression engine, 365 hp (272 kW) Wright Whirlwind J6-9E, ser. No. 12733, had a "speed ring". On March 29, 1933, the rebuild was complete, and the registration number was changed to NR-688E, and the aircraft was painted orange. On both sides of the fuselage scrolls with the names of the sponsors were painted. The aircraft was dubbed Lituanica, Latin for Lithuania.

== Pilots ==
Steponas Darius and Stasys Girėnas were Lithuanian pilots, emigrants to the United States, who made a significant flight in the history of world aviation. On July 15, 1933, they flew across the Atlantic Ocean, covering a distance of 3,984 miles (6,411 kilometers) without landing, in 37 hours and 11 minutes (107.1 mph). In terms of comparison, as far as the distance of non-stop flights was concerned, their result ranked second only to that of Russell Boardman and John Polando, and ranked fourth in terms of duration of flight at the time. Although Darius and Girenas did not have navigational equipment and flew under unfavorable weather conditions, the flight was one of the most precise in aviation history. It equaled, and in some aspects surpassed, Charles Lindbergh's classic flight.

== Flight ==
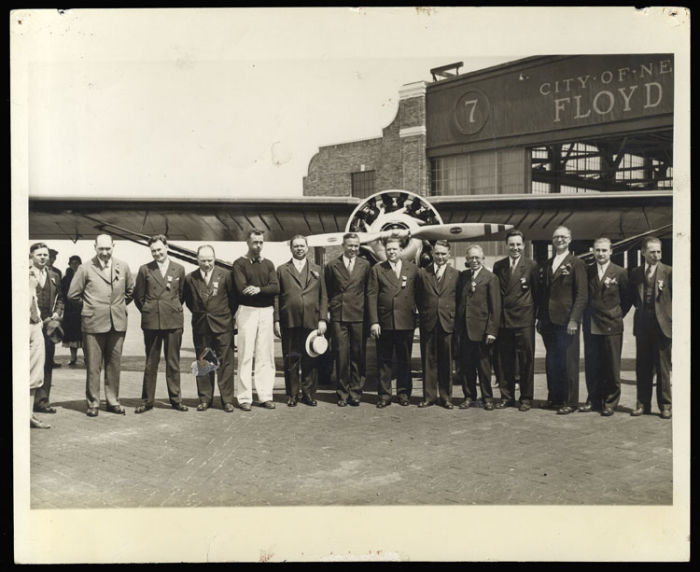
1933 rare original photograph of the Committee of Greater New York sponsoring the Darius–Girenas Transatlantic flight, in front of the orange Belanca plane Lituanica at Floyd Bennett Field, Brooklyn, New York, taken a week before the take-off on July 15. At extreme left is A. Mažeika, who initiated the issuance of the special flight benefitting stamps; both pilots are to the right or left of the plane at center.

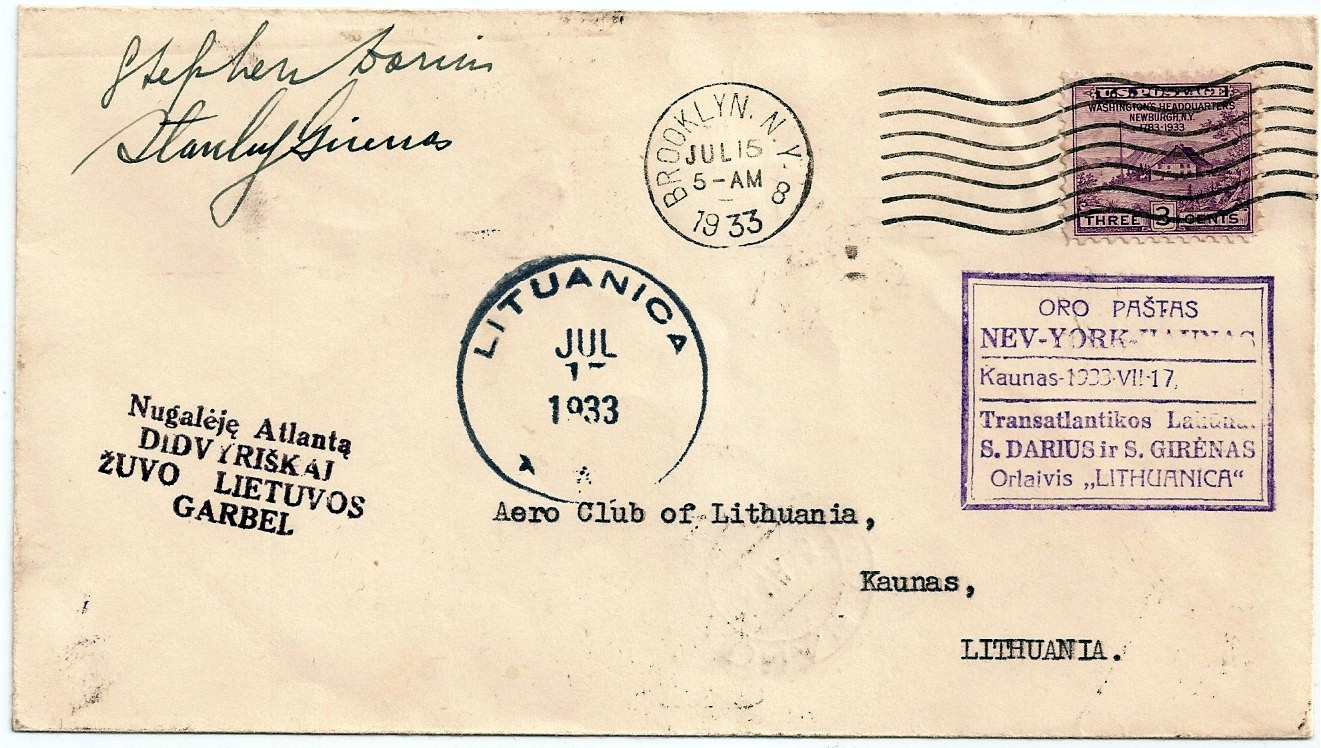
Flight cover autographed by pilots Steponas Darius & Stasys Girenas of the ill-fated 1933 Lituanica

An ordinary unmodified plane of this size cannot cover a comparable distance (the Cessna 152, for instance, has a range of 1200 km), even today. The flight was also important from a scientific and technological perspective, as it explored air flows and the capabilities of this type of aircraft. In their last letter, the pilots wrote that either a successful flight or a possible catastrophe would be valuable and significant enough and hence it was worthwhile to fly in either case.

After taking off from Floyd Bennett Field in New York on July 15, 1933, 6:24 am EDT, Darius and Girėnas successfully crossed the Atlantic, only to perish on July 17, 0:36 am (CET) by the village of Kuhdamm, near Soldin, Germany (now Pszczelnik, near Myślibórz, Poland (52°51'11.57"N 14°50'17.78"E)). The planned route was: New York – Newfoundland – Atlantic Ocean – Ireland – London – Amsterdam – Swinemünde – Königsberg – Kaunas airport (a total of 7,186 km). Due to weather conditions over Ireland, they veered to the north and reached Germany via Scotland and the North Sea. In 37 hours and 11 minutes, until the moment of the crash, they had flown 6411 km (over 7000 km in actual flight path), only 636 km short of their goal—Kaunas.

== Possible reasons for the crash ==
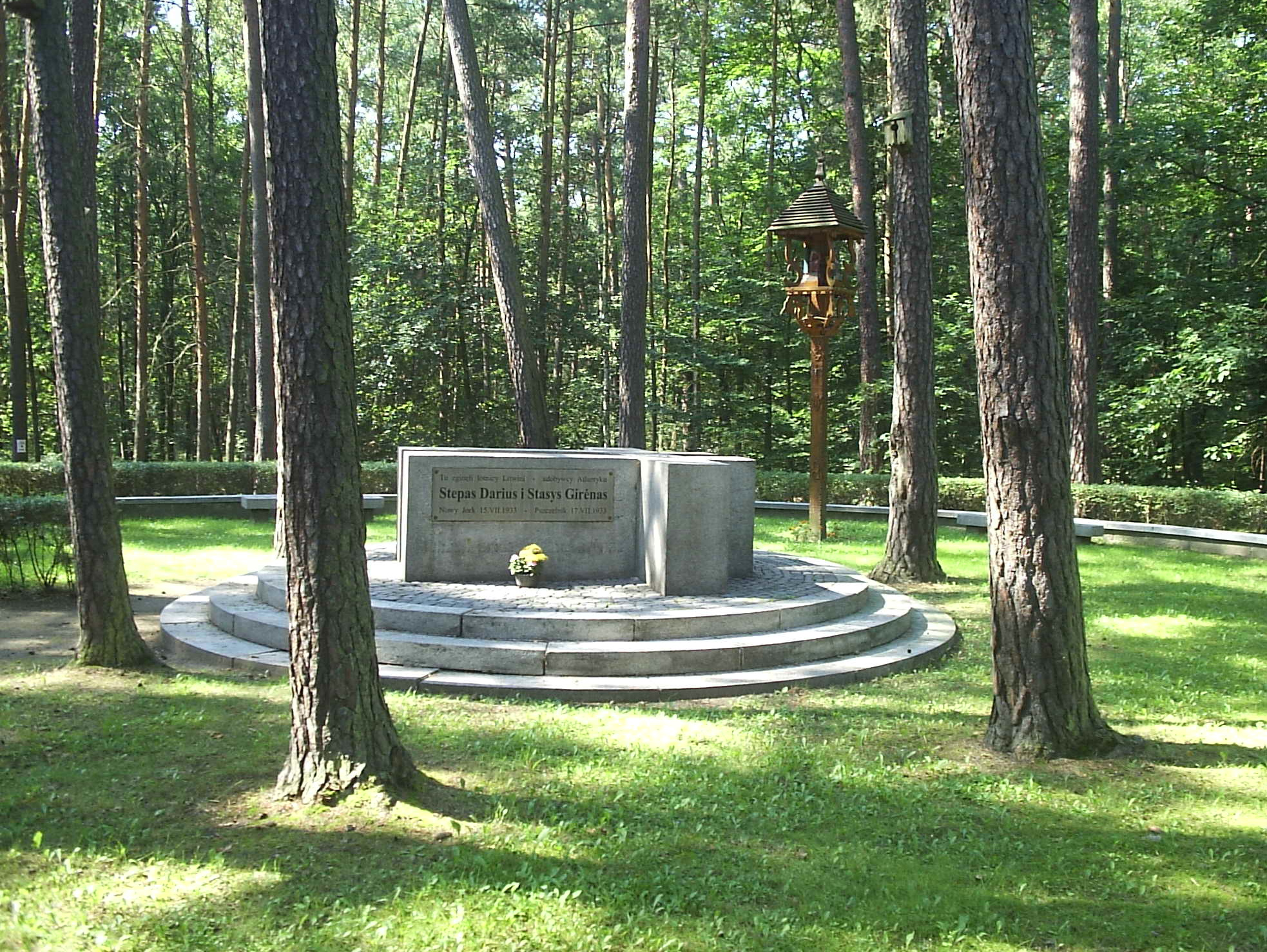
Monument marking the crash site near Pszczelnik in Poland

A Lithuanian board of investigation was appointed to determine the cause. It concluded that the pilots were properly qualified, and the aircraft was properly outfitted. They added that the most difficult part of the flight was executed with great precision. The commission concluded that during the crash the aircraft engine was running (the propeller was rotating), and there was enough fuel on board.

Some sources mention pilot error, but both pilots were highly experienced. During his career as pilot, Darius had never been involved in any previous accidents. In 1931, Girėnas had won first prize in a flight festival in Chicago for gliding his plane and landing with a dead engine.

According to the board, the catastrophe occurred due to difficult weather conditions combined with engine defects. The crash most probably was a result of failed emergency landing. There were rumors and suspicions in some quarters, that the plane was shot down, having been mistaken for a spy plane, because it flew near a German concentration camp. Autopsies of pilots revealed no signs of bullets. However, not all parts of the plane were returned to the Lithuanian government.

== After the crash ==
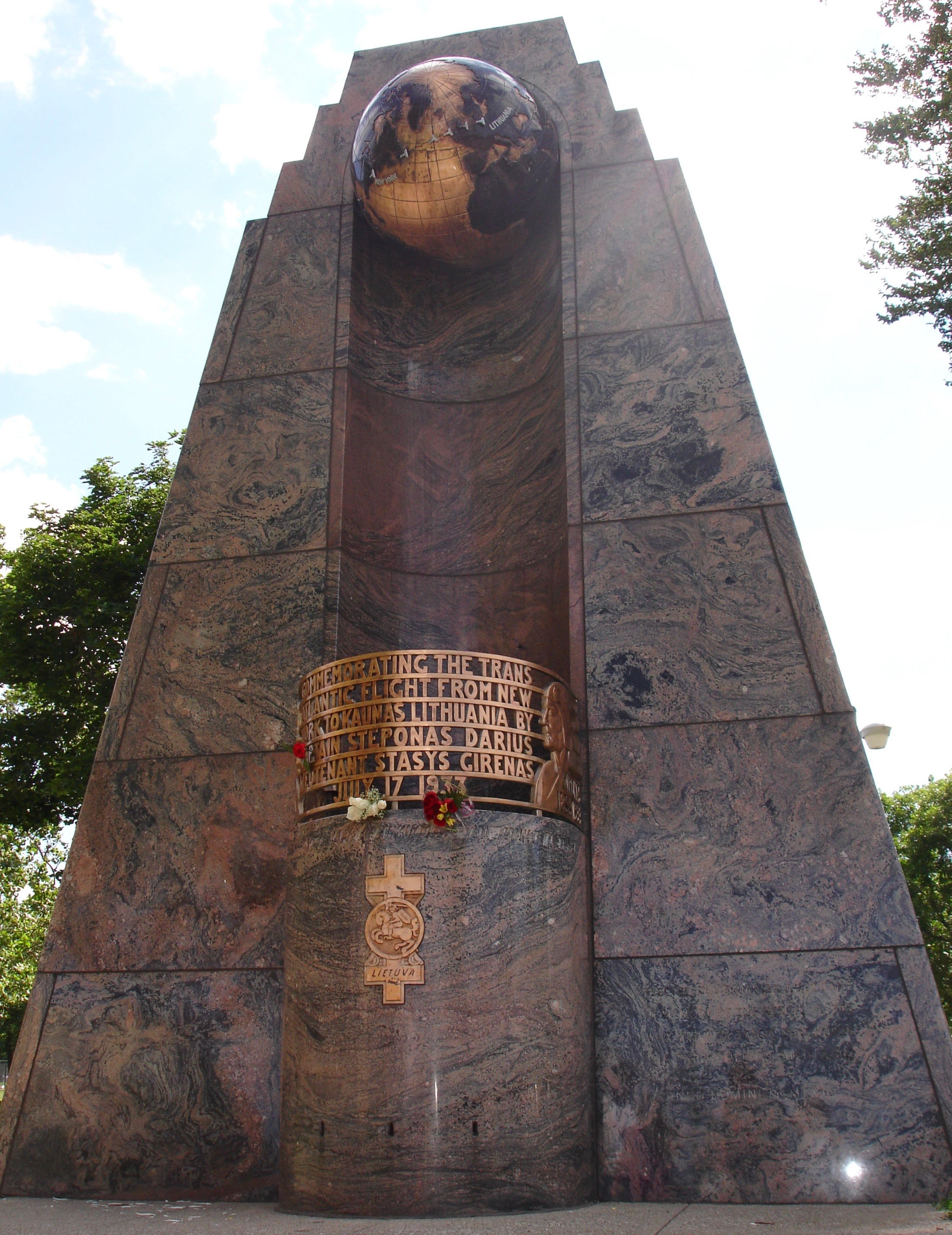
Monument to Darius and Girėnas in Marquette Park, Chicago

On July 19, a German Deruluft airplane carried the bodies of the pilots back to Lithuania. The people of Kaunas met the heroes in great sorrow. The funeral was a solemn occasion and was the cause of official national mourning.

A few months after the Lituanica tragedy, some prominent members of the Chicago Lithuanian community discussed the possibility of financing another transatlantic flight. This idea was greeted with much enthusiasm, and enough funds were raised during the Great Depression. A faster and more modern Lockheed Vega was purchased from the Lockheed Aircraft Corp., the same model used by Wiley Post in his round-the-world flight, and by Amelia Earhart, the first woman to fly solo across the Atlantic.

The aircraft was christened Lituanica II on Sunday, April 22, 1934. When the pilot originally chosen for the flight unexpectedly resigned in the spring, the Lithuanian organizers turned to Felix Waitkus, and he accepted the challenge. Although he landed in Ireland and not in Kaunas, he entered aviation history for being the sixth pilot to fly solo across the Atlantic.

In 1934 the bodies of Darius and Girėnas were embalmed by professor Jurgis Zilinskas. In 1936 the Lithuanian government decided to build a mausoleum for Darius and Girėnas in Kaunas' old cemetery, that was destroyed after Soviet re-occupation. From then until the present day, the wreckage of Lituanica has been on display in the Vytautas the Great War Museum in Kaunas.

The pilots' bodies rest in the Military Cemetery of Šančiai, Kaunas.

== Memorials ==
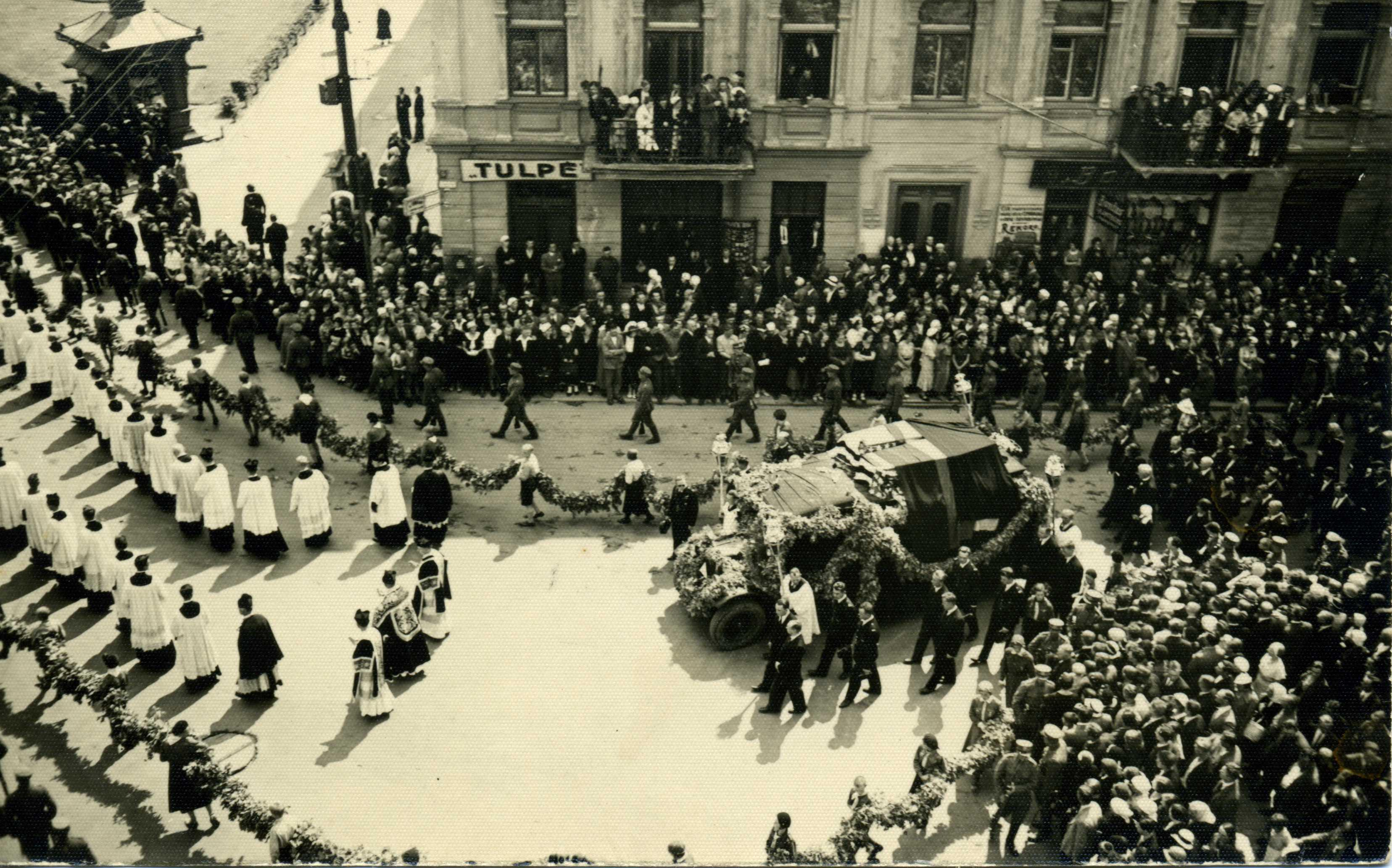
Funeral of the pilots in Kaunas

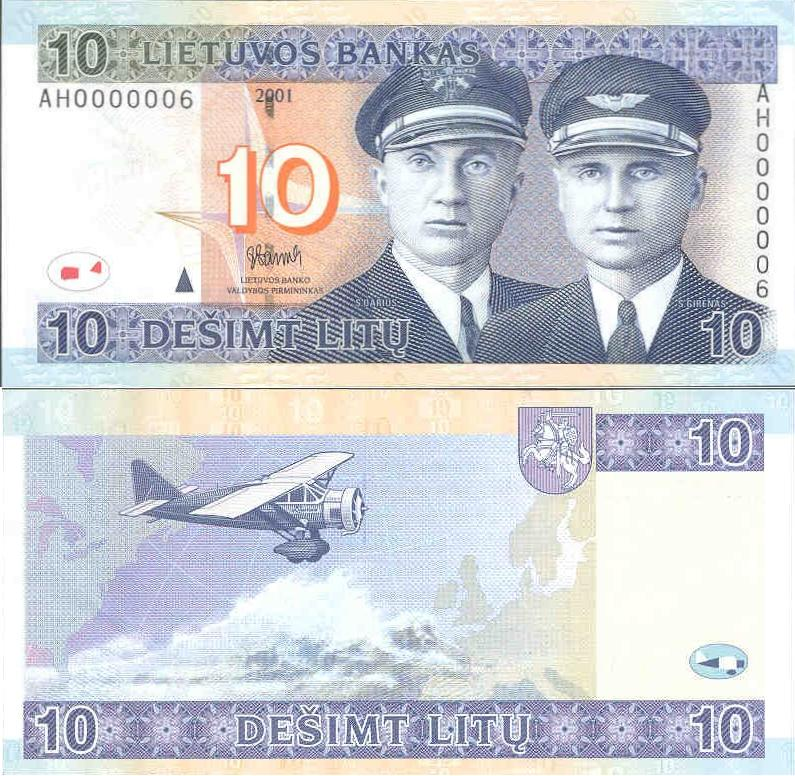
10 litas banknote featuring the flight

Chicago's Lithuanian community erected an Art Deco Monument commemorating Girėnas and Darius in Chicago's Marquette Park in 1935 where it still stands to this day. Feliksas Vaitkus was inspired by the flight and commemorated it with the flight of the Lituanica II in 1935.

The flight is commemorated in a movie Skrydis per Atlantą (Flight over the Atlantic) (1983). Kaunas's sports stadium, S.Darius and S.Girėnas Stadium, where the Lithuanian national soccer team plays its home matches, is also named in their honor. There is a tall stone monument near the stadium, the Lithuanian Academy of Sport and the Ąžuolynas Park dedicated to the pilots.

Sculptor Bronius Pundzius made a relief of the pilots' faces on the Puntukas, then the largest known boulder in the territory of Lithuania, in 1943.

In New York City, in 1957, the fliers were memorialized with a granite flagstaff showing the pair in bas-relief. The monument is located in Lithuania Square, in Williamsburg, Brooklyn.

In Kaunas, a model of the Lituanica was put in 2013 to commemorate 80 years of the event.

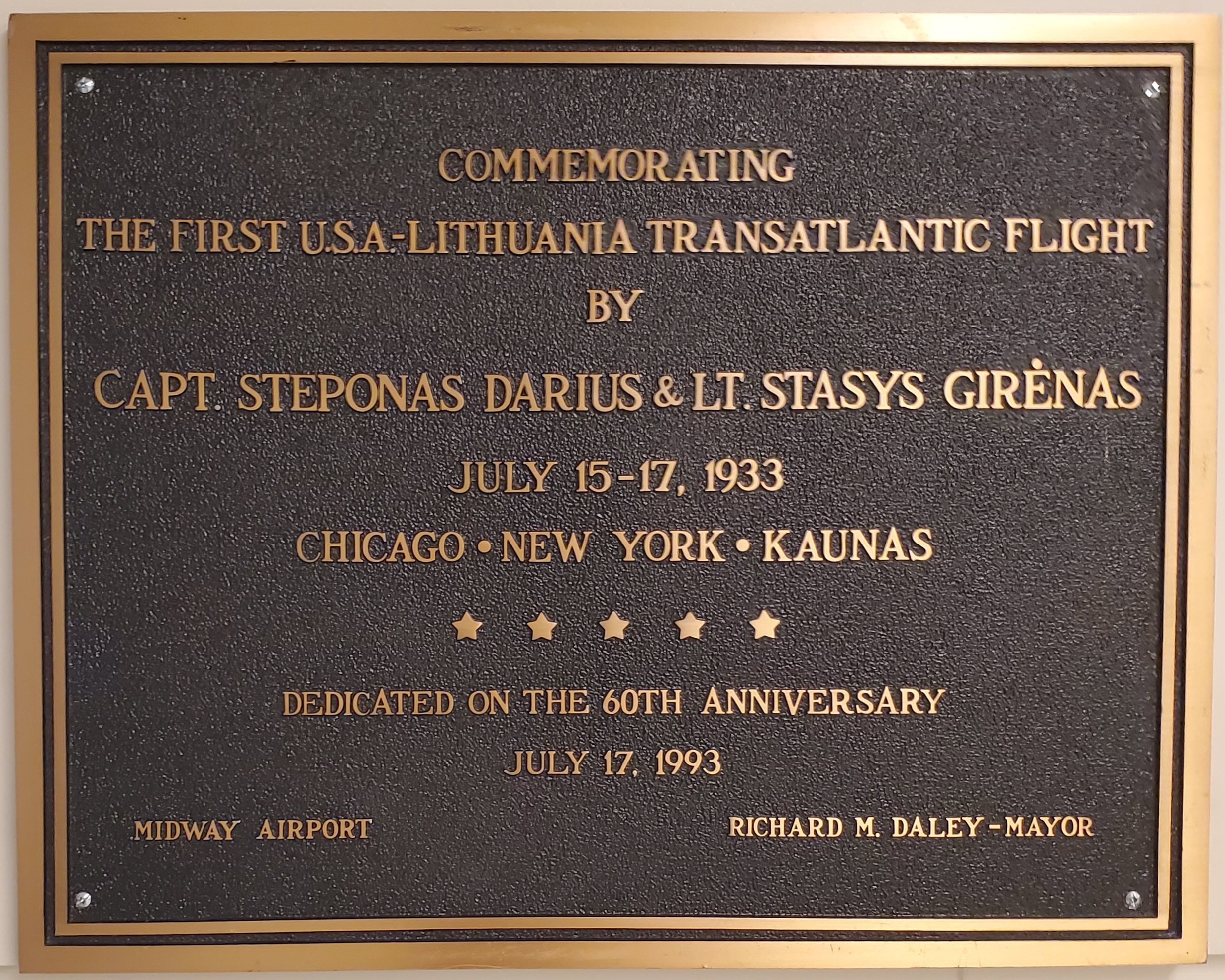
Plaque referencing the flight at the Midway International Airport in Chicago

South Lituanica Ave, in the Bridgeport neighborhood in Chicago, IL is named after this flight. The avenue runs from 31st and 35th streets, and after a shift eastwards at West 35th Street proceeds south to West 38th Place.

The small town of Beverly Shores, Indiana (just west of Michigan City, Indiana), has another memorial to the Lituanica flight. There, in 1968, the American Lithuanian Club established a park and named it Lituanica Park after the Bellanca CH-300 used in the flight. In 1971, to honor the pilots, a large modern sculpture by J. Barkis was placed in the park's pond.

Before the flight Girėnas and Darius left a testament to the Lithuanian nation:

"Young Lithuania! Inspired by Your spirit, we embark on a mission we have chosen. May our success strengthen Your spirit and confidence in Your own powers and talents! But should Neptune and the mighty ruler of storms Perkūnas unleash their wrath upon us, should they stop our way to Young Lithuania and call Lituanica to their realm – then You, Young Lithuania, will have to resolve anew, make sacrifice and prepare for a new quest, so that gods of stormy oceans be pleased with Your effort, resolution, and do not summon You for the Great Judgement. May Lituanica's victory strengthen the spirit of young sons of Lithuania, inspire them for new quests. May Lituanica's defeat and sinking into the depths of the Atlantic nurture perseverance and resoluteness in young Lithuanians, so that a Winged Lithuanian conquers the treacherous Atlantic for the glory of Mother Lithuania! We therefore dedicate and sacrifice our flight for You, Young Lithuania!"

== See also ==
- Air Lituanica
