= Anykščiai Church =

Anykščiai Church of St. Matthew
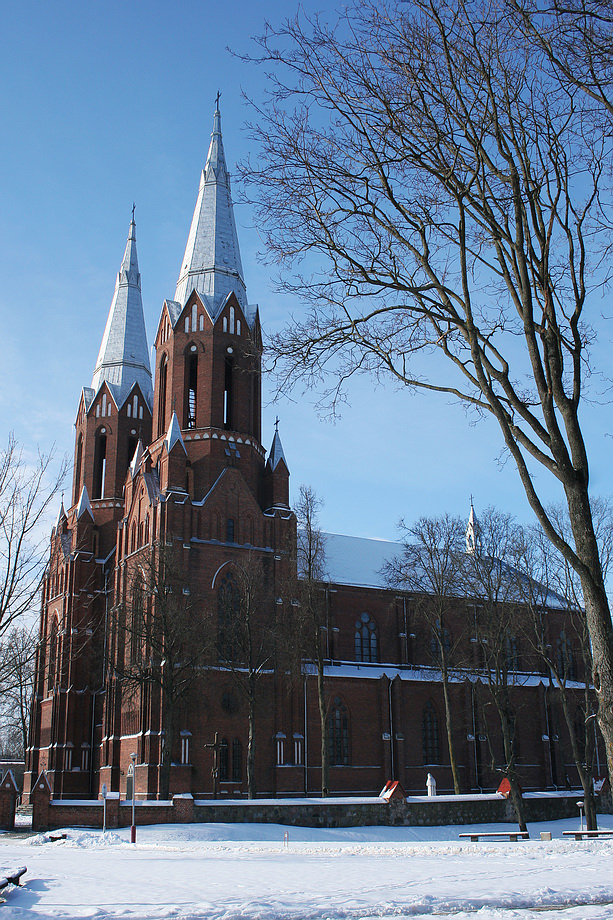
- Anykščiai Church of St. Matthew
- 55°31′28″N 25°05′58″E
- Location: Anykščiai
- Country: Lithuania
- Denomination: Roman Catholic Church

History
- Status: Functional
- Founded: Original before 1500, rebuilt in 1899–1909
- Dedication: St. Matthew
- Consecrated: December 8, 1914

Architecture
- Architect: Nikolay Andrejev (Николай Андреев)
- Architectural type: Neo-Gothic

Specifications
- Length: 64 metres (210 ft)
- Width: 36 metres (118 ft)
- Height: 36 metres (118 ft)
- Materials: Red brick

Administration
- Province: Archdiocese of Vilnius
- Diocese: Diocese of Panevėžys
- Deanery: Anykščiai Deanery
- Parish: Anykščiai Parish of Apostle Evangelist St. Matthew

Church of Apostle Evangelist St. Matthew in Anykščiai (Lithuanian: Anykščių Šv. apaštalo evangelisto Mato bažnyčia) is a red brick Neo-Gothic church in Anykščiai, Lithuania. The Church is situated on the right bank of the Šventoji River. The twin spires of the church, each 79 metres (259 ft) in height, make the church the tallest in Lithuania. The brightly colored stained glass windows were the creation of Anortė Mackelaitė, the well known stained glass artist of Lithuania, between 1971 and 1986.

== History ==
Anykščiai was first mentioned in written sources in 1442. The first church built before 1500 was a wooden structure. Following the construction of the Catholic Church, the town was mentioned as a city with Magdeburg rights in 1516. The church was destroyed by fire in 1566 and 1671, but quickly rebuilt. The decaying wooden structure was replaced by a brick church, built in 1765. An accompanying white four-storey bell tower was completed in 1823.

Following the construction of the narrow gauge railway line between Panevėžys and Švenčionėliai in the 19th century, the parish was re-developed and the church was re-built over a ten-year period between 1899 and 1909. The original spires were 84 metres (276 ft) in height, but they were purposefully destroyed during World War I. The falling towers also damaged the roof; the interior, including the main altar and portions of the archives, was devastated by a fire in 1928. This prompted reconstruction of the church. The spires were rebuilt, but their height was lowered by 5 metres.

There is also a legend related to the Puntukas stone, a famous stone in Lithuania. According to this legend, the devil wanted to destroy the church by dropping a heavy stone on it. However, early crowing of a rooster prevented this happening and the stone fell away from the church. It is now a visitor attraction.

== Architecture ==
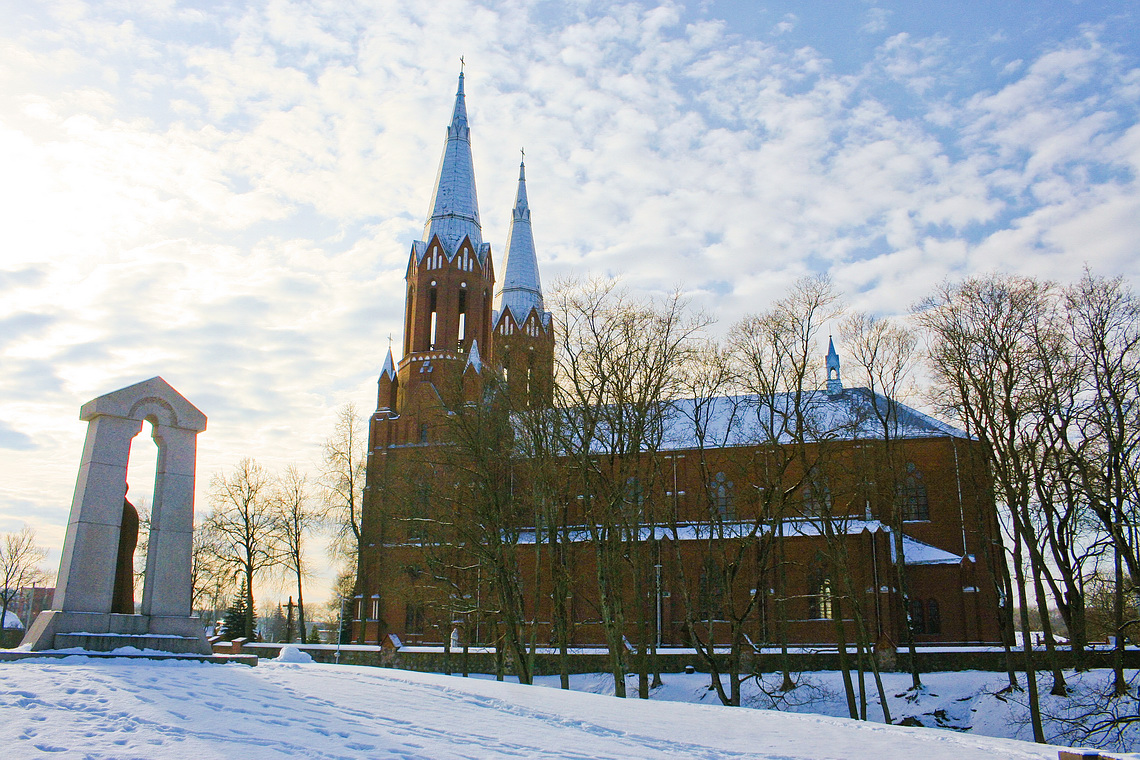
Anykščiai Church with the monument of bishop Antanas Baranauskas in the park

The present church building consists of twin towers, both of which are 79 metres in height. The building was built in red bricks in the Neo-Gothic architectural style. The floor plan follows the basic principles of cathedral architecture: it has two aisles and groin vaults. The church façade has stained glass windows which were installed between 1971–1986, credited to Marija Mackelaitė. Artistically decorated altars and the pulpits are seen inside the church. A statue of St Matthew is installed behind the large cross in the main altar. Inside the church, apart many elegant altars there are also statues and paintings. The church also has a large organ which was bought in 1998 from Shirley Baptist Church, Southampton. Rimas Idzelis, an amateur artist, installed Stations of the Cross on the churchyard fence in 1982–1988. The church is surrounded by a park. In 1993 a monument was built for the Lithuanian poet and bishop Antanas Baranauskas (1835–1902), native of Anykščiai and author of the famous poem Anykščių šilelis (The Grove of Anykščiai). Sculptor Arūnas Sakalauskas and architect Ričardas Krištapavičius were awarded the Lithuanian National Prize for the monument in 1994.

== Notable people ==
Juozapas Čepėnas (1880–1976) was pastor of Anykščiai from 1938 to 1945. During that time he protested the Holocaust and Nazi occupation of Lithuania. Monsignor Albertas Talačka (1921–1999), former pastor of Anykščiai Church, bequeathed his private library of over 4,000 books and art collection to the town and parish of Anykščiai. The art collection is on permanent displayed of Center of Sacral Art in Anykščiai.
