= Jurate Rosales =

Amateur historian (1929–2023)

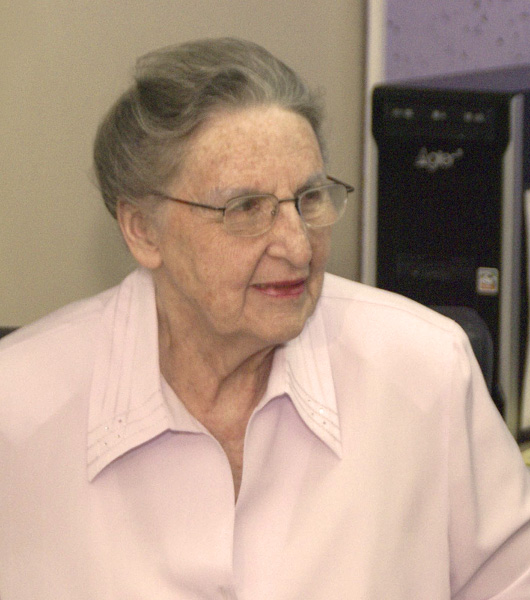
- Born: Jūratė Regina Statkutė de Rosales; 9 September 1929; Kaunas, Lithuania
- Died: 4 September 2023 (aged 93); Caracas, Venezuela
- Occupations: Teacher, journalist

Jūratė Regina Statkutė de Rosales (9 September 1929 – 4 September 2023) was a Lithuanian-born Venezuelan journalist and amateur historian. She published studies in Venezuela, Spain, the United States, and Lithuania in which she claims that the Goths were not a Germanic but a Baltic people.

== Biography ==
Jūratė Regina Statkutė de Rosales was born on 9 September 1929 in Kaunas, Lithuania, and lived with her parents, at least partly in Paris, until 1938. Her father, Jonas Statkus, was head of the State Security Department of Lithuania until he was arrested on 6 July 1940 along with Augustinas Povilaitis, General Kazys Skučas, and several other high officials after the Soviet ultimatum to Lithuania. He was sent to Butyrka prison in Moscow where it is presumed he died on an unknown date.

After the end of the Second World War, Rosales moved to France where she learned Latin and French, receiving a degree as a teacher of French. She continued her studies at Columbia University in New York, where she taught English, Spanish, and German. In 1960 she married Venezuelan engineer Luis Rosales; they raised five children—Luis, Juan, Sarunas, Rimas, and Saulius—in a multi-lingual household, using both Spanish and Lithuanian. Starting in 1983 she held the position of editor-in-chief of the Venezuelan opposition magazine Zeta, in addition to writing for Venezuelan daily paper El Nuevo País and the Cleveland-based Dirva. She held an honorary doctorate from the Lithuanian University of Educational Sciences.

Rosales died in Caracas on 4 September 2023, at the age of 93.

== Hypothesis on the Goths being Baltic ==
Rosales published studies in the United States, Spain, Venezuela, and Lithuania supporting the idea that the Goths were a Baltic, not Germanic people. Rosales traced her research on the controversial hypothesis back to 17th-century Prussian scholar Matthäus Prätorius who is thought to have first proposed the idea, which was supported by several Lithuanian historians including Simonas Daukantas and Česlovas Gedgaudas as well as linguist Kazimieras Būga.

The idea has been heavily criticized by other academics such as Zigmas Zinkevičius as pseudohistory primarily driven by nationalist, not academic concepts. Professors Alvydas Butkus and Stefano M. Lanza make similar criticisms of her methodology, to the point of accusing her of twisting the meaning of sources and using "nonexistent" Lithuanian words. In response to Butkus and Lanza, de Rosales pointed out they lacked depth of knowledge when analysing her texts and that they only focused on one page of the book, ignoring the rest.

== Bibliography ==
- Rosales, Jurate (2004). Los godos (in Spanish). Barcelona: Ariel. ISBN 9788434467170.
