= Pszczelnik =

- Village
- Location within Poland
- Coordinates: 52°51′54″N 14°49′28″E
- Country: Poland
- Voivodeship: West Pomeranian
- County: Myślibórz
- Gmina: Myślibórz
- Population: 180

Pszczelnik [ˈpʂt͡ʂɛlɲik] (German: Kuhdamm) is a village in the administrative district of Gmina Myślibórz, within Myślibórz County, West Pomeranian Voivodeship, in north-western Poland. It lies approximately 9 km (6 mi) south of Myślibórz and 64 km (40 mi) south of the regional capital Szczecin.

For the history of the region, see History of Pomerania.

The village has a population of 180.

In 1933, Lithuanian aviators Steponas Darius and Stasys Girenas crashed southeast of the village in their ill-fated transatlantic flight aboard Lituanica in 1933. A monument is now dedicate to them.
