= Steponas Darius =

Lithuanian-American long-distance pilot

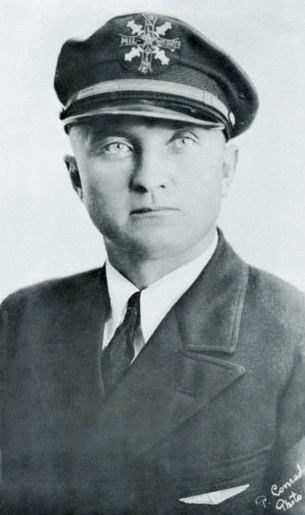
- Steponas Darius
- Born: Steponas Darašius; January 8, 1896; Rubiškės, Kovno Governorate, Russian Empire
- Died: July 17, 1933 (aged 37); Kuhdamm, Nazi Germany
- Cause of death: Aviation crash
- Known for: The second-longest non-stop flight by distance, and the fourth-longest by duration, at the time; also the first official airmail shipment from the United States to Europe
- Spouse: Jaunutė Škėmaitė-Darienė
- Aviation career
- Famous flights: Lituanica flight
- Flight license: 1927
- Air force: Lithuanian Air Force
- Rank: Captain

Steponas Darius (known as Stephen Darius in the US; born Steponas Jucevičius-Darašius; January 8, 1896 – July 17, 1933) was a Lithuanian American pilot, who died in a non-stop flight attempt in the Lituanica from New York City to Kaunas, Lithuania, in 1933.

== Biography ==
Born in Rubiškės, in the Kovno Governorate of the Russian Empire, Darius immigrated to the US with his family in 1907. In 1917 he joined the United States Army, after the United States entered World War I, and changed his name to Darius. He served as a telephone operator in the 149th Field Artillery Regiment, fought in France, was wounded and received the Purple Heart medal. In 1920, he returned to Lithuania and joined the Lithuanian Army, graduating from War School of Kaunas in 1921. He participated in the Klaipėda Revolt of 1923. While living in Lithuania he completed pilot training. In 1927 he returned to the United States and started working in civil aviation. He initially formed South Bend Airways in partnership with Carl G. Jordan of South Bend, Indiana. Their fleet consisted of a Pheasant H-10 and an Eaglerock Long Wing, both powered by OX-5 engines of World War I vintage. He lived for a while in the Jordan household prior to moving to Chicago.

While living in Lithuania he actively promoted various sports. He initiated the building of the first stadium in Kaunas; it was later named after him – the S. Darius and S. Girėnas Stadium. He played basketball, baseball, ice hockey, and practiced boxing and athletics, while also being an international footballer, having played for Lithuania national football team in its first competitive game against Estonia on June 23, 1923. He was also part of Lithuania's squad for the 1924 Summer Olympics, but he did not play in any matches. Since he was the first to publish booklets about basketball and baseball, he is considered to have brought those sports to Lithuania. He was also the first chairman of Lithuanian Physical Education Union, and a founder of Sporto Žurnalas (Sports Magazine).

=== Death ===
On July 15, 1933 Steponas Darius, along with Stasys Girėnas, he attempted a nonstop flight from New York City, United States to Kaunas, Lithuania – a total of 7,186 kilometres (4,465 mi), in a Bellanca CH-300 Pacemaker airplane named Lituanica. After successfully crossing the Atlantic Ocean in 37 hours and 11 minutes, they crashed on July 17, at 0:36 am (Berlin Time), by the village of Kuhdamm, near Soldin, Germany (now Pszczelnik, near the Myślibórz area, Poland), most probably because of difficult weather conditions combined with engine problems. Both aviators were killed in the crash. They had covered a distance of 6,411 km (3,984 mi) without landing, and were only 650 km (400 mi) short of their destination.

== Awards and honors ==
- On 18 May 1934, Lithuania issued a set of six airmail stamps, in honor of Captains Darius and Girėnas, and the Lituanica.
- A monument to Darius and Girėnas is located in the northeast corner of Marquette Park in Chicago.
- The World War II Liberty Ship SS Stepas Darius was named in his honor.
- His birth village, originally named Rubiškės (now located in the Judrėnai Eldership) was renamed Darius after his death.
- Asteroid 288960 Steponasdarius, discovered by Kazimieras Černis and Justas Zdanavičius in 2004, was named in his memory. The official naming citation was published by the Minor Planet Center on June 9, 2017 (M.P.C. 105279).

== Gallery ==
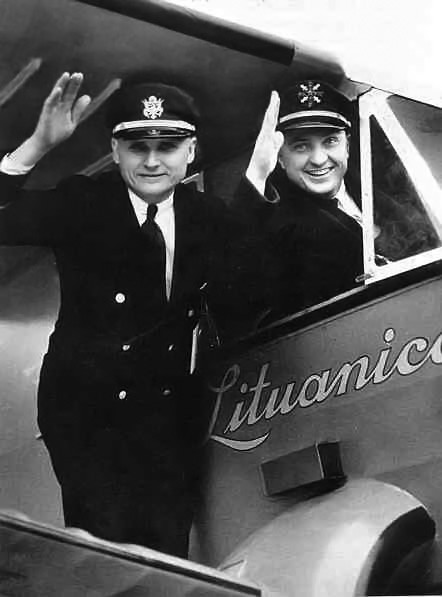
Darius (in cockpit) and Stasys Girėnas before the Lituanica transatlantic flight in 1933 July

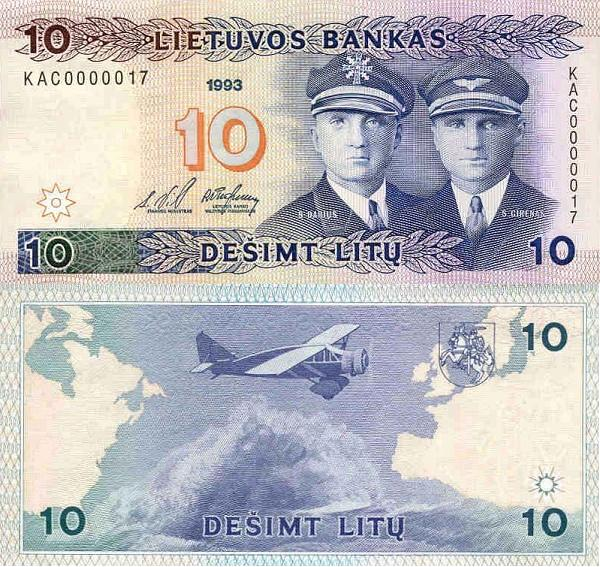
Darius (left) and Girėnas on a Lithuanian 10 litas banknote

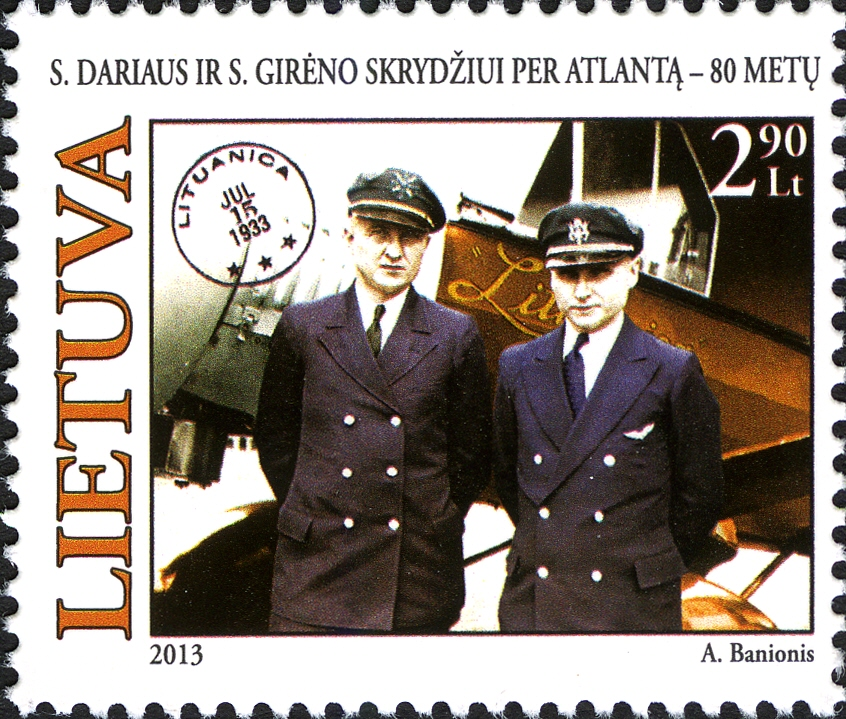
2013 Lithuanian stamp
