= Stasys Girėnas =

Lithuanian-American long-distance pilot

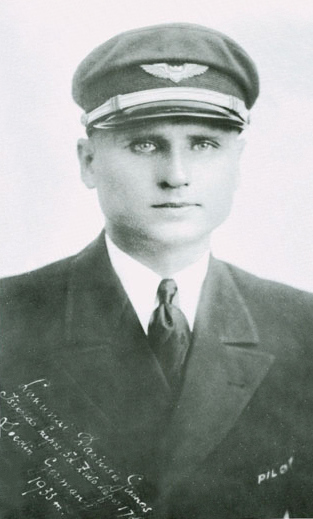
- Born: Stasys Girskis; October 4, 1893; Vytogala, near Šilalė, Kovno Governorate, Russian Empire
- Died: July 17, 1933 (aged 39); Kuhdamm, Nazi Germany
- Cause of death: Aviation crash
- Known for: Second by the distance of non-stop flights and fourth by the time spent in air at the time, also being first official airmail shipment from United States to Europe.
- Awards: The main prize in Chicago air festival for the best landing of the plane with its engine turned off (1931).
- Aviation career
- Famous flights: Lithuanica flight
- Flight license: 1925

Stasys Girėnas (known as Stanley T. Girenas in the US; born Stasys Girskis; October 4, 1893 in Vytogala, Kovno Governorate – July 17, 1933 near Soldin, Germany) was a Lithuanian-American pilot, who died in a non-stop flight attempt with the Lituanica from New York City to Kaunas, Lithuania, in 1933.

== Biography ==
Girenas was born in Vytogala, in the Šilalė district of Lithuania, then part of the Kovno Governorate of the Russian Empire. In 1910, when he was 17 years old, he emigrated to the United States, and settled in Chicago. As a young man he worked in a printing house. In 1917, upon the entry of the U.S. into World War I, he enlisted in the United States Army, where he was trained as a mechanic. In 1919, after being honorably discharged, he worked as a cab driver, and at the same time learned to fly. He acquired a plane in 1925. Despite being injured in an air crash, he continued flying and working in civil aviation. In 1931 he won the first prize at the Chicago Air Festival for the best landing of a plane with its engine turned off.

=== Death ===
On July 15, 1933, along with Steponas Darius, he attempted a nonstop flight from New York City, to Kaunas, Lithuania - a total of 7,186 km (4,465 mi), in a Bellanca CH-300 Pacemaker airplane named Lituanica. After successfully crossing the Atlantic Ocean in 37 hours and 11 minutes, their plane crashed on July 17, 0:36 AM (Berlin Time) by the village of Kuhdamm, near Soldin, Germany (now Pszczelnik, Myślibórz County, Poland). Difficult weather conditions combined with engine defects were the findings of the official investigation. Both aviators were killed in the crash. They had covered a distance of 6,412 kilometres (3,984 miles) without landing, only 650 km (400 mi) short of their final destination.

== Awards and honors ==
- On 18 May 1934, Lithuania issued a set of six airmail stamps, in honor of Captains Girėnas and Darius, and the Lituanica.
- In New York City, in 1957, the fliers were memorialized with a granite flagstaff showing the pair in bas-relief. The monument is located in Lithuania Square, in Williamsburg, Brooklyn.
- Asteroid 288961 Stasysgirėnas, discovered by astronomers Kazimieras Černis and Justas Zdanavičius in 2004, was named in his memory. The official naming citation was published by the Minor Planet Center on June 9, 2017 (M.P.C. 105279).

== Gallery ==
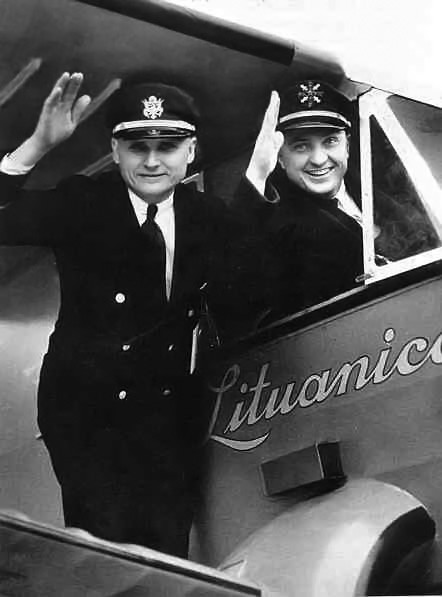
Girėnas (left) and Steponas Darius before the Lituanica transatlantic flight in 1933

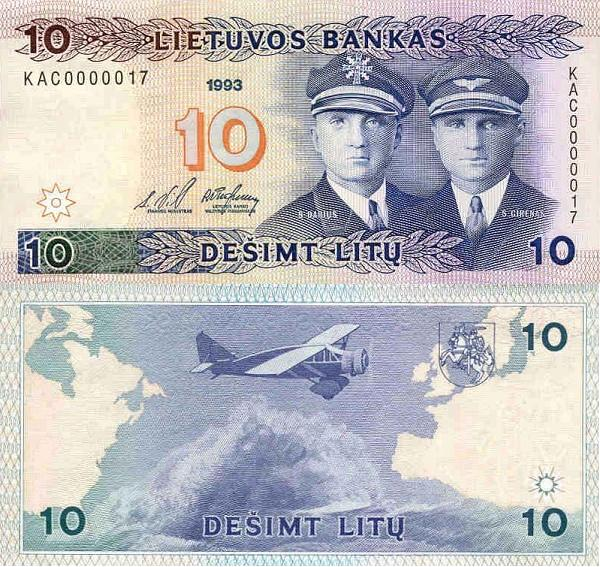
Darius (left) and Girėnas on a Lithuanian 10 litas banknote

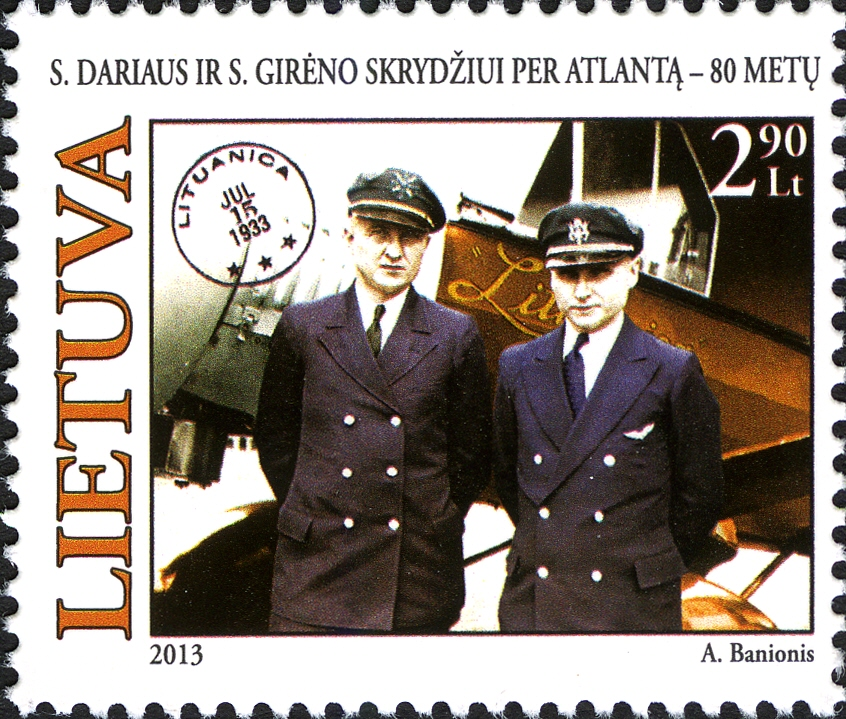
2013 Lithuanian stamp
