= Meanings of minor-planet names: 288001–289000 =

As minor planet discoveries are confirmed, they are given a permanent number by the IAU's Minor Planet Center (MPC), and the discoverers can then submit names for them, following the IAU's naming conventions. The list below concerns those minor planets in the specified number-range that have received names, and explains the meanings of those names.

Official naming citations of newly named small Solar System bodies are approved and published in a bulletin by IAU's Working Group for Small Bodies Nomenclature (WGSBN). Before May 2021, citations were published in MPC's Minor Planet Circulars for many decades. Recent citations can also be found on the JPL Small-Body Database (SBDB). Until his death in 2016, German astronomer Lutz D. Schmadel compiled these citations into the Dictionary of Minor Planet Names (DMP) and regularly updated the collection.

Based on Paul Herget's The Names of the Minor Planets, Schmadel also researched the unclear origin of numerous asteroids, most of which had been named prior to World War II. This article incorporates text from this source, which is in the public domain: SBDB New namings may only be added to this list below after official publication as the preannouncement of names is condemned. The WGSBN publishes a comprehensive guideline for the naming rules of non-cometary small Solar System bodies.

== 288001–288100 ==
Named minor planet	Provisional	This minor planet was named for...	Ref · Catalog
There are no named minor planets in this number range

== 288101–288200 ==
back to top

Named minor planet	Provisional	This minor planet was named for...	Ref · Catalog
There are no named minor planets in this number range

== 288201–288300 ==
back to top

Named minor planet	Provisional	This minor planet was named for...	Ref · Catalog
There are no named minor planets in this number range

== 288301–288400 ==
back to top

Named minor planet	Provisional	This minor planet was named for...	Ref · Catalog
There are no named minor planets in this number range

== 288401–288500 ==
back to top

Named minor planet	Provisional	This minor planet was named for...	Ref · Catalog
288478 Fahlman	2004 FA_{17}	Gregory Fahlman (born 1944) has served since 2003 as the Director General of the Herzberg Institute of Astrophysics, National Research Council of Canada. He has made extensive contributions to studies of globular star clusters using ground- and space-based telescopes.	JPL · 288478

== 288501–288600 ==
back to top

Named minor planet	Provisional	This minor planet was named for...	Ref · Catalog
There are no named minor planets in this number range

== 288601–288700 ==
back to top

Named minor planet	Provisional	This minor planet was named for...	Ref · Catalog
288615 Tempesti	2004 ND_{9}	Piero Tempesti (1917–2011), an Italian astronomer and member of IAU's "Division V Variable Stars" and "Commission 27 Variable Stars" until his death in 2011. His research included minor planets and comets, as well as variable stars and novae (Src).	IAU · 288615

== 288701–288800 ==
back to top

Named minor planet	Provisional	This minor planet was named for...	Ref · Catalog
There are no named minor planets in this number range

== 288801–288900 ==
back to top

Named minor planet	Provisional	This minor planet was named for...	Ref · Catalog
There are no named minor planets in this number range

== 288901–289000 ==
back to top

Named minor planet	Provisional	This minor planet was named for...	Ref · Catalog
288959 Biržai	2004 TJ_{16}	Biržai, a city located in the northern Aukštaitija region of Lithuania, and also one of the oldest cities in the country.	JPL · 288959
288960 Steponasdarius	2004 TN_{16}	Steponas Darius (1896–1933), a Lithuanian American pilot, who, together with Stasys Girėnas (see below), died in a non-stop flight attempt with the Lituanica from New York City to Kaunas, Lithuania, in 1933. The airplane crashed over Poland, after they crossed the Atlantic in 37 hours and completed nearly 90% of the journey.	JPL · 288960
288961 Stasysgirėnas	2004 TZ_{19}	Stasys Girėnas (1893–1933), a Lithuanian American pilot, who, together with Steponas Darius (see above), died in a non-stop flight attempt with the Lituanica from New York City to Kaunas, Lithuania, in 1933. The airplane crashed over Poland, after they crossed the Atlantic in 37 hours and completed nearly 90% of the journey.	JPL · 288961

back to top

Preceded by 287,001–288,000	Meanings of minor-planet names List of minor planets: 288,001–289,000	Succeeded by 289,001–290,000
