= Fahlman =

Fahlman is a surname. Notable people with the surname include:

- Gregory Fahlman (born 1944), Canadian astronomer
- Scott Fahlman (born 1948), American computer scientist
- Sven Fahlman (1914–2003), Swedish fencer
