= Gregory Fahlman =

Canadian astronomer (born 1944)

Gregory Gaylord Fahlman (born 1944) OBC is a Canadian astronomer specializing in the study of globular clusters.

From 2003 to 2019, he was Director General of the NRC Herzberg Institute of Astrophysics in Victoria, British Columbia.

He has served on numerous national committees and review panels, including the Board of Directors of the Canada-France-Hawaii Telescope (CFHT). From June 1999 until January 2003, Fahlman served as CFHT's Executive Director.

In 2013, he was made a member of the Order of British Columbia in recognition for being a "world renowned astronomy researcher".

The main-belt asteroid 288478 Fahlman, discovered by Canadian astronomer David D. Balam in 2004, was named in his honor.
