= List of minor planets: 288001–289000 =

The following is a partial list of minor planets, running from minor-planet number 288001 through 289000, inclusive. The primary data for this and other partial lists is based on JPL's "Small-Body Orbital Elements" and data available from the Minor Planet Center. Critical list information is also provided by the MPC, unless otherwise specified from Lowell Observatory. A detailed description of the table's columns and additional sources are given on the main page including a complete list of every page in this series, and a statistical break-up on the dynamical classification of minor planets.

Also see the summary list of all named bodies in numerical and alphabetical order, and the corresponding naming citations for the number range of this particular list. New namings may only be added to this list after official publication, as the preannouncement of names is condemned by the Working Group for Small Bodies Nomenclature of the International Astronomical Union.

Near-Earth obj.	MBA (inner)	MBA (outer)	Centaur
Mars-crosser	MBA (middle)	Jupiter trojan	Trans-Neptunian obj.
Unclassified

== 288001–288100 ==
Designation			Discovery			Properties		Ref
Permanent	Provisional	Named after	Date	Site	Discoverer(s)	Category	Diam.	Ref
288001	2003 UZ_{191}	—	October 23, 2003	Anderson Mesa	LONEOS	V	990 m	MPC · JPL
288002	2003 UH_{192}	—	October 23, 2003	Anderson Mesa	LONEOS	·	1.5 km	MPC · JPL
288003	2003 UJ_{195}	—	October 20, 2003	Kitt Peak	Spacewatch	(2076)	880 m	MPC · JPL
288004	2003 UF_{197}	—	October 21, 2003	Kitt Peak	Spacewatch	·	1.8 km	MPC · JPL
288005	2003 UQ_{197}	—	October 21, 2003	Anderson Mesa	LONEOS	·	1.6 km	MPC · JPL
288006	2003 US_{200}	—	October 21, 2003	Socorro	LINEAR	·	960 m	MPC · JPL
288007	2003 UU_{201}	—	October 21, 2003	Socorro	LINEAR	·	2.1 km	MPC · JPL
288008	2003 UU_{203}	—	October 21, 2003	Kitt Peak	Spacewatch	·	1.4 km	MPC · JPL
288009	2003 UY_{203}	—	October 21, 2003	Kitt Peak	Spacewatch	·	2.2 km	MPC · JPL
288010	2003 UT_{204}	—	October 22, 2003	Kitt Peak	Spacewatch	(5)	1.1 km	MPC · JPL
288011	2003 UH_{207}	—	October 22, 2003	Kitt Peak	Spacewatch	HYG	3.3 km	MPC · JPL
288012	2003 UZ_{207}	—	October 22, 2003	Kitt Peak	Spacewatch	·	960 m	MPC · JPL
288013	2003 UC_{210}	—	October 23, 2003	Anderson Mesa	LONEOS	·	1 km	MPC · JPL
288014	2003 UB_{211}	—	October 23, 2003	Kitt Peak	Spacewatch	·	1.9 km	MPC · JPL
288015	2003 UC_{211}	—	October 23, 2003	Kitt Peak	Spacewatch	·	2.4 km	MPC · JPL
288016	2003 UN_{213}	—	October 24, 2003	Socorro	LINEAR	·	1.6 km	MPC · JPL
288017	2003 UZ_{213}	—	October 24, 2003	Socorro	LINEAR	·	1.2 km	MPC · JPL
288018	2003 UX_{219}	—	October 21, 2003	Palomar	NEAT	·	620 m	MPC · JPL
288019	2003 UG_{221}	—	October 22, 2003	Kitt Peak	Spacewatch	HYG	3.4 km	MPC · JPL
288020	2003 UH_{221}	—	October 22, 2003	Kitt Peak	Spacewatch	NEM	3.0 km	MPC · JPL
288021	2003 UF_{226}	—	October 22, 2003	Socorro	LINEAR	(1547)	2.5 km	MPC · JPL
288022	2003 UE_{227}	—	October 23, 2003	Kitt Peak	Spacewatch	·	1.9 km	MPC · JPL
288023	2003 UD_{228}	—	October 23, 2003	Kitt Peak	Spacewatch	·	1.9 km	MPC · JPL
288024	2003 UK_{228}	—	October 23, 2003	Anderson Mesa	LONEOS	·	1.1 km	MPC · JPL
288025	2003 UL_{228}	—	October 23, 2003	Anderson Mesa	LONEOS	NYS	1.5 km	MPC · JPL
288026	2003 UQ_{228}	—	October 23, 2003	Kitt Peak	Spacewatch	V	830 m	MPC · JPL
288027	2003 UJ_{231}	—	October 24, 2003	Socorro	LINEAR	·	3.3 km	MPC · JPL
288028	2003 UG_{232}	—	October 24, 2003	Kitt Peak	Spacewatch	·	2.0 km	MPC · JPL
288029	2003 UY_{235}	—	October 22, 2003	Kitt Peak	Spacewatch	ADE	3.1 km	MPC · JPL
288030	2003 UZ_{238}	—	October 24, 2003	Socorro	LINEAR	VER	4.7 km	MPC · JPL
288031	2003 UM_{239}	—	October 24, 2003	Socorro	LINEAR	·	780 m	MPC · JPL
288032	2003 UE_{241}	—	October 24, 2003	Kitt Peak	Spacewatch	·	2.2 km	MPC · JPL
288033	2003 UB_{242}	—	October 24, 2003	Socorro	LINEAR	·	2.2 km	MPC · JPL
288034	2003 UN_{242}	—	October 24, 2003	Socorro	LINEAR	·	1.3 km	MPC · JPL
288035	2003 UH_{251}	—	October 25, 2003	Kitt Peak	Spacewatch	·	1.5 km	MPC · JPL
288036	2003 UM_{256}	—	October 25, 2003	Socorro	LINEAR	(2076)	1.1 km	MPC · JPL
288037	2003 UV_{256}	—	October 25, 2003	Socorro	LINEAR	·	2.2 km	MPC · JPL
288038	2003 UR_{259}	—	October 25, 2003	Socorro	LINEAR	·	6.3 km	MPC · JPL
288039	2003 UE_{262}	—	October 26, 2003	Kitt Peak	Spacewatch	NYS	1.3 km	MPC · JPL
288040	2003 UW_{262}	—	October 27, 2003	Kitt Peak	Spacewatch	·	3.6 km	MPC · JPL
288041	2003 UH_{263}	—	October 27, 2003	Anderson Mesa	LONEOS	V	860 m	MPC · JPL
288042	2003 UP_{267}	—	October 28, 2003	Socorro	LINEAR	·	2.4 km	MPC · JPL
288043	2003 UW_{269}	—	October 24, 2003	Bergisch Gladbach	W. Bickel	PAD	2.2 km	MPC · JPL
288044	2003 UB_{271}	—	October 17, 2003	Palomar	NEAT	·	2.2 km	MPC · JPL
288045	2003 UC_{271}	—	October 17, 2003	Palomar	NEAT	·	5.8 km	MPC · JPL
288046	2003 UV_{271}	—	October 28, 2003	Socorro	LINEAR	·	2.7 km	MPC · JPL
288047	2003 UV_{276}	—	October 30, 2003	Socorro	LINEAR	·	2.5 km	MPC · JPL
288048	2003 UV_{279}	—	October 27, 2003	Kitt Peak	Spacewatch	·	1.9 km	MPC · JPL
288049	2003 UE_{283}	—	October 29, 2003	Anderson Mesa	LONEOS	·	3.7 km	MPC · JPL
288050	2003 UD_{290}	—	October 21, 2003	Palomar	NEAT	·	3.5 km	MPC · JPL
288051	2003 UR_{290}	—	October 23, 2003	Kitt Peak	Spacewatch	·	1.0 km	MPC · JPL
288052	2003 UN_{293}	—	October 18, 2003	Socorro	LINEAR	EUN	2.1 km	MPC · JPL
288053	2003 UC_{296}	—	October 16, 2003	Kitt Peak	Spacewatch	·	1.4 km	MPC · JPL
288054	2003 UW_{299}	—	October 16, 2003	Palomar	NEAT	HNS	1.7 km	MPC · JPL
288055	2003 UW_{300}	—	October 17, 2003	Kitt Peak	Spacewatch	·	1.0 km	MPC · JPL
288056	2003 UD_{304}	—	October 17, 2003	Kitt Peak	Spacewatch	·	3.0 km	MPC · JPL
288057	2003 UA_{309}	—	October 19, 2003	Kitt Peak	Spacewatch	·	2.1 km	MPC · JPL
288058	2003 UG_{309}	—	October 19, 2003	Kitt Peak	Spacewatch	KON	2.6 km	MPC · JPL
288059	2003 US_{314}	—	October 29, 2003	Anderson Mesa	LONEOS	(5)	1.4 km	MPC · JPL
288060	2003 UD_{319}	—	October 20, 2003	Socorro	LINEAR	·	2.8 km	MPC · JPL
288061	2003 UW_{319}	—	October 21, 2003	Anderson Mesa	LONEOS	·	1.6 km	MPC · JPL
288062	2003 UU_{325}	—	October 17, 2003	Apache Point	SDSS	·	3.4 km	MPC · JPL
288063	2003 UH_{327}	—	October 17, 2003	Apache Point	SDSS	EUN	1.6 km	MPC · JPL
288064	2003 UD_{343}	—	October 19, 2003	Kitt Peak	Spacewatch	·	890 m	MPC · JPL
288065	2003 UE_{343}	—	October 19, 2003	Apache Point	SDSS	·	1.5 km	MPC · JPL
288066	2003 UX_{349}	—	October 19, 2003	Apache Point	SDSS	·	1.0 km	MPC · JPL
288067	2003 UX_{350}	—	October 19, 2003	Apache Point	SDSS	AGN	1.7 km	MPC · JPL
288068	2003 UH_{357}	—	October 19, 2003	Kitt Peak	Spacewatch	·	1.5 km	MPC · JPL
288069	2003 UQ_{358}	—	October 19, 2003	Kitt Peak	Spacewatch	·	1.9 km	MPC · JPL
288070	2003 UO_{359}	—	October 19, 2003	Kitt Peak	Spacewatch	·	3.0 km	MPC · JPL
288071	2003 UW_{380}	—	October 22, 2003	Apache Point	SDSS	·	1.4 km	MPC · JPL
288072	2003 UJ_{398}	—	October 22, 2003	Apache Point	SDSS	·	4.3 km	MPC · JPL
288073	2003 UZ_{404}	—	October 23, 2003	Apache Point	SDSS	·	1.2 km	MPC · JPL
288074	2003 UU_{407}	—	October 23, 2003	Apache Point	SDSS	V	710 m	MPC · JPL
288075	2003 UY_{412}	—	October 23, 2003	Kitt Peak	Spacewatch	HNS	1.5 km	MPC · JPL
288076	2003 US_{414}	—	October 18, 2003	Kitt Peak	Spacewatch	·	1.5 km	MPC · JPL
288077	2003 UZ_{414}	—	October 19, 2003	Apache Point	SDSS	·	1.8 km	MPC · JPL
288078	2003 VG_{2}	—	November 4, 2003	Socorro	LINEAR	·	1.2 km	MPC · JPL
288079	2003 VV_{5}	—	November 15, 2003	Kitt Peak	Spacewatch	fast	1.9 km	MPC · JPL
288080	2003 VR_{6}	—	November 15, 2003	Kitt Peak	Spacewatch	MAS	780 m	MPC · JPL
288081	2003 VJ_{7}	—	November 15, 2003	Kitt Peak	Spacewatch	THM	2.7 km	MPC · JPL
288082	2003 VN_{9}	—	November 15, 2003	Palomar	NEAT	(5)	1.7 km	MPC · JPL
288083	2003 VS_{9}	—	November 15, 2003	Palomar	NEAT	·	950 m	MPC · JPL
288084	2003 VX_{10}	—	November 15, 2003	Palomar	NEAT	·	3.2 km	MPC · JPL
288085	2003 VN_{11}	—	November 15, 2003	Palomar	NEAT	·	2.6 km	MPC · JPL
288086	2003 WT_{2}	—	November 17, 2003	Catalina	CSS	NYS	1.4 km	MPC · JPL
288087	2003 WH_{5}	—	November 16, 2003	Kitt Peak	Spacewatch	EUN	1.6 km	MPC · JPL
288088	2003 WB_{6}	—	November 18, 2003	Palomar	NEAT	·	2.3 km	MPC · JPL
288089	2003 WP_{6}	—	November 16, 2003	Kitt Peak	Spacewatch	·	1.1 km	MPC · JPL
288090	2003 WE_{7}	—	November 18, 2003	Socorro	LINEAR	T_{j} (2.98) · EUP	7.0 km	MPC · JPL
288091	2003 WW_{8}	—	November 16, 2003	Kitt Peak	Spacewatch	·	4.7 km	MPC · JPL
288092	2003 WJ_{9}	—	November 18, 2003	Kitt Peak	Spacewatch	·	1.7 km	MPC · JPL
288093	2003 WK_{13}	—	November 16, 2003	Kitt Peak	Spacewatch	·	1.2 km	MPC · JPL
288094	2003 WT_{13}	—	November 16, 2003	Kitt Peak	Spacewatch	·	2.4 km	MPC · JPL
288095	2003 WD_{18}	—	November 19, 2003	Palomar	NEAT	L5	10 km	MPC · JPL
288096	2003 WD_{19}	—	November 19, 2003	Socorro	LINEAR	·	990 m	MPC · JPL
288097	2003 WE_{19}	—	November 19, 2003	Socorro	LINEAR	MAR	1.8 km	MPC · JPL
288098	2003 WR_{23}	—	November 18, 2003	Kitt Peak	Spacewatch	MAS	880 m	MPC · JPL
288099	2003 WE_{25}	—	November 18, 2003	Kitt Peak	Spacewatch	·	1.5 km	MPC · JPL
288100	2003 WJ_{25}	—	November 18, 2003	Kitt Peak	Spacewatch	·	2.4 km	MPC · JPL

== 288101–288200 ==
back to top

Designation			Discovery			Properties		Ref
Permanent	Provisional	Named after	Date	Site	Discoverer(s)	Category	Diam.	Ref
288101	2003 WS_{26}	—	November 20, 2003	Socorro	LINEAR	·	2.4 km	MPC · JPL
288102	2003 WW_{33}	—	November 19, 2003	Catalina	CSS	·	3.0 km	MPC · JPL
288103	2003 WY_{34}	—	November 19, 2003	Kitt Peak	Spacewatch	·	3.1 km	MPC · JPL
288104	2003 WK_{38}	—	November 19, 2003	Socorro	LINEAR	·	1.8 km	MPC · JPL
288105	2003 WG_{40}	—	November 19, 2003	Kitt Peak	Spacewatch	·	1.5 km	MPC · JPL
288106	2003 WP_{46}	—	November 18, 2003	Palomar	NEAT	(5)	1.4 km	MPC · JPL
288107	2003 WS_{49}	—	November 19, 2003	Socorro	LINEAR	·	1.2 km	MPC · JPL
288108	2003 WB_{50}	—	November 19, 2003	Socorro	LINEAR	·	2.9 km	MPC · JPL
288109	2003 WG_{50}	—	November 19, 2003	Socorro	LINEAR	EUN	1.4 km	MPC · JPL
288110	2003 WT_{56}	—	November 21, 2003	Socorro	LINEAR	PHO	1.7 km	MPC · JPL
288111	2003 WX_{58}	—	November 18, 2003	Kitt Peak	Spacewatch	V	670 m	MPC · JPL
288112	2003 WA_{60}	—	November 18, 2003	Palomar	NEAT	·	1.5 km	MPC · JPL
288113	2003 WC_{62}	—	November 19, 2003	Kitt Peak	Spacewatch	·	2.4 km	MPC · JPL
288114	2003 WP_{62}	—	November 19, 2003	Kitt Peak	Spacewatch	NYS	1.3 km	MPC · JPL
288115	2003 WY_{62}	—	November 19, 2003	Kitt Peak	Spacewatch	·	1.3 km	MPC · JPL
288116	2003 WP_{65}	—	November 19, 2003	Kitt Peak	Spacewatch	·	1.4 km	MPC · JPL
288117	2003 WD_{67}	—	November 19, 2003	Kitt Peak	Spacewatch	(5)	1.5 km	MPC · JPL
288118	2003 WE_{67}	—	November 19, 2003	Kitt Peak	Spacewatch	·	2.4 km	MPC · JPL
288119	2003 WR_{67}	—	November 19, 2003	Kitt Peak	Spacewatch	·	1.9 km	MPC · JPL
288120	2003 WL_{68}	—	November 19, 2003	Kitt Peak	Spacewatch	·	1.1 km	MPC · JPL
288121	2003 WS_{68}	—	November 19, 2003	Kitt Peak	Spacewatch	·	1.6 km	MPC · JPL
288122	2003 WY_{68}	—	November 19, 2003	Kitt Peak	Spacewatch	·	1.2 km	MPC · JPL
288123	2003 WT_{71}	—	November 20, 2003	Socorro	LINEAR	·	980 m	MPC · JPL
288124	2003 WX_{71}	—	November 20, 2003	Socorro	LINEAR	EUN	1.6 km	MPC · JPL
288125	2003 WT_{76}	—	November 19, 2003	Kitt Peak	Spacewatch	·	970 m	MPC · JPL
288126	2003 WV_{76}	—	November 19, 2003	Kitt Peak	Spacewatch	·	3.3 km	MPC · JPL
288127	2003 WH_{77}	—	November 19, 2003	Kitt Peak	Spacewatch	·	2.2 km	MPC · JPL
288128	2003 WN_{78}	—	November 20, 2003	Socorro	LINEAR	·	1.1 km	MPC · JPL
288129	2003 WO_{79}	—	November 20, 2003	Socorro	LINEAR	·	1.7 km	MPC · JPL
288130	2003 WM_{80}	—	November 20, 2003	Socorro	LINEAR	·	1.1 km	MPC · JPL
288131	2003 WY_{81}	—	November 19, 2003	Socorro	LINEAR	·	950 m	MPC · JPL
288132	2003 WO_{84}	—	November 19, 2003	Socorro	LINEAR	·	770 m	MPC · JPL
288133	2003 WA_{85}	—	November 20, 2003	Kitt Peak	Spacewatch	·	1.5 km	MPC · JPL
288134	2003 WJ_{92}	—	November 18, 2003	Palomar	NEAT	·	1.7 km	MPC · JPL
288135	2003 WZ_{93}	—	November 19, 2003	Anderson Mesa	LONEOS	·	840 m	MPC · JPL
288136	2003 WT_{95}	—	November 19, 2003	Anderson Mesa	LONEOS	·	670 m	MPC · JPL
288137	2003 WY_{95}	—	November 19, 2003	Anderson Mesa	LONEOS	·	690 m	MPC · JPL
288138	2003 WM_{96}	—	November 19, 2003	Anderson Mesa	LONEOS	(5)	970 m	MPC · JPL
288139	2003 WH_{99}	—	November 20, 2003	Socorro	LINEAR	NYS	1.7 km	MPC · JPL
288140	2003 WD_{101}	—	November 21, 2003	Socorro	LINEAR	·	1.6 km	MPC · JPL
288141	2003 WQ_{101}	—	November 21, 2003	Catalina	CSS	·	2.2 km	MPC · JPL
288142	2003 WK_{102}	—	November 21, 2003	Socorro	LINEAR	·	1.2 km	MPC · JPL
288143	2003 WU_{102}	—	November 21, 2003	Socorro	LINEAR	MAR	1.5 km	MPC · JPL
288144	2003 WE_{103}	—	November 21, 2003	Socorro	LINEAR	·	860 m	MPC · JPL
288145	2003 WQ_{103}	—	November 21, 2003	Socorro	LINEAR	·	1.9 km	MPC · JPL
288146	2003 WN_{104}	—	November 21, 2003	Socorro	LINEAR	JUN	1.6 km	MPC · JPL
288147	2003 WR_{108}	—	November 20, 2003	Socorro	LINEAR	·	1.7 km	MPC · JPL
288148	2003 WT_{113}	—	November 20, 2003	Socorro	LINEAR	·	1.2 km	MPC · JPL
288149	2003 WA_{117}	—	November 20, 2003	Socorro	LINEAR	·	1.4 km	MPC · JPL
288150	2003 WQ_{118}	—	November 20, 2003	Socorro	LINEAR	·	2.8 km	MPC · JPL
288151	2003 WM_{123}	—	November 20, 2003	Socorro	LINEAR	(5)	1.7 km	MPC · JPL
288152	2003 WS_{124}	—	November 20, 2003	Socorro	LINEAR	(5)	2.1 km	MPC · JPL
288153	2003 WD_{125}	—	November 20, 2003	Socorro	LINEAR	·	1.9 km	MPC · JPL
288154	2003 WX_{127}	—	November 20, 2003	Socorro	LINEAR	EUN	1.9 km	MPC · JPL
288155	2003 WJ_{128}	—	November 21, 2003	Kitt Peak	Spacewatch	·	2.2 km	MPC · JPL
288156	2003 WM_{128}	—	November 21, 2003	Kitt Peak	Spacewatch	·	2.0 km	MPC · JPL
288157	2003 WZ_{128}	—	November 21, 2003	Kitt Peak	Spacewatch	·	970 m	MPC · JPL
288158	2003 WD_{130}	—	November 21, 2003	Socorro	LINEAR	·	2.5 km	MPC · JPL
288159	2003 WK_{134}	—	November 21, 2003	Socorro	LINEAR	·	1.2 km	MPC · JPL
288160	2003 WQ_{135}	—	November 21, 2003	Socorro	LINEAR	·	1.6 km	MPC · JPL
288161	2003 WE_{137}	—	November 21, 2003	Socorro	LINEAR	·	2.0 km	MPC · JPL
288162	2003 WV_{142}	—	November 23, 2003	Socorro	LINEAR	·	2.8 km	MPC · JPL
288163	2003 WN_{149}	—	November 24, 2003	Palomar	NEAT	MAR	1.5 km	MPC · JPL
288164	2003 WY_{149}	—	November 24, 2003	Anderson Mesa	LONEOS	·	820 m	MPC · JPL
288165	2003 WG_{150}	—	November 24, 2003	Anderson Mesa	LONEOS	·	2.9 km	MPC · JPL
288166	2003 WO_{153}	—	November 26, 2003	Anderson Mesa	LONEOS	TIR	3.9 km	MPC · JPL
288167	2003 WV_{154}	—	November 26, 2003	Kitt Peak	Spacewatch	·	860 m	MPC · JPL
288168	2003 WR_{155}	—	November 26, 2003	Kitt Peak	Spacewatch	PHO	1.3 km	MPC · JPL
288169	2003 WM_{156}	—	November 29, 2003	Socorro	LINEAR	EUN	1.7 km	MPC · JPL
288170	2003 WP_{161}	—	November 30, 2003	Socorro	LINEAR	·	1.6 km	MPC · JPL
288171	2003 WA_{164}	—	November 30, 2003	Kitt Peak	Spacewatch	·	2.4 km	MPC · JPL
288172	2003 WY_{164}	—	November 30, 2003	Kitt Peak	Spacewatch	AST	1.7 km	MPC · JPL
288173	2003 WE_{165}	—	November 30, 2003	Kitt Peak	Spacewatch	·	1.8 km	MPC · JPL
288174	2003 WQ_{168}	—	November 19, 2003	Catalina	CSS	·	970 m	MPC · JPL
288175	2003 WT_{179}	—	November 20, 2003	Kitt Peak	M. W. Buie	·	1.5 km	MPC · JPL
288176	2003 WG_{180}	—	November 20, 2003	Kitt Peak	M. W. Buie	PHO	3.3 km	MPC · JPL
288177	2003 WO_{189}	—	November 20, 2003	Palomar	NEAT	HNS	1.6 km	MPC · JPL
288178	2003 WP_{189}	—	November 21, 2003	Palomar	NEAT	·	1.8 km	MPC · JPL
288179	2003 WR_{190}	—	November 29, 2003	Socorro	LINEAR	·	2.0 km	MPC · JPL
288180	2003 WL_{192}	—	November 20, 2003	Kitt Peak	Spacewatch	HOF	3.5 km	MPC · JPL
288181	2003 WB_{193}	—	November 24, 2003	Socorro	LINEAR	·	2.1 km	MPC · JPL
288182	2003 WS_{193}	—	November 19, 2003	Anderson Mesa	LONEOS	·	880 m	MPC · JPL
288183	2003 WW_{193}	—	November 24, 2003	Kitt Peak	Spacewatch	·	1.4 km	MPC · JPL
288184	2003 XO	—	December 1, 2003	Socorro	LINEAR	H	780 m	MPC · JPL
288185	2003 XA_{3}	—	December 1, 2003	Socorro	LINEAR	·	1.7 km	MPC · JPL
288186	2003 XC_{5}	—	December 1, 2003	Socorro	LINEAR	·	2.2 km	MPC · JPL
288187	2003 XY_{6}	—	December 3, 2003	Anderson Mesa	LONEOS	·	3.8 km	MPC · JPL
288188	2003 XX_{10}	—	December 11, 2003	Socorro	LINEAR	BAR	2.0 km	MPC · JPL
288189	2003 XK_{12}	—	December 14, 2003	Palomar	NEAT	·	2.2 km	MPC · JPL
288190	2003 XA_{13}	—	December 12, 2003	Palomar	NEAT	·	830 m	MPC · JPL
288191	2003 XB_{13}	—	December 14, 2003	Kitt Peak	Spacewatch	·	3.1 km	MPC · JPL
288192	2003 XA_{14}	—	December 15, 2003	Kitt Peak	Spacewatch	·	1.5 km	MPC · JPL
288193	2003 XZ_{17}	—	December 14, 2003	Kitt Peak	Spacewatch	EUN	1.8 km	MPC · JPL
288194	2003 XY_{20}	—	December 14, 2003	Kitt Peak	Spacewatch	HNS	1.6 km	MPC · JPL
288195	2003 XF_{31}	—	December 1, 2003	Kitt Peak	Spacewatch	·	790 m	MPC · JPL
288196	2003 XD_{34}	—	December 1, 2003	Kitt Peak	Spacewatch	·	730 m	MPC · JPL
288197	2003 XX_{40}	—	December 14, 2003	Kitt Peak	Spacewatch	·	2.3 km	MPC · JPL
288198	2003 YX_{2}	—	December 18, 2003	Desert Eagle	W. K. Y. Yeung	·	2.5 km	MPC · JPL
288199	2003 YL_{3}	—	December 19, 2003	Kingsnake	J. V. McClusky	·	2.5 km	MPC · JPL
288200	2003 YZ_{3}	—	December 16, 2003	Catalina	CSS	T_{j} (2.99)	6.0 km	MPC · JPL

== 288201–288300 ==
back to top

Designation			Discovery			Properties		Ref
Permanent	Provisional	Named after	Date	Site	Discoverer(s)	Category	Diam.	Ref
288201	2003 YK_{9}	—	December 16, 2003	Anderson Mesa	LONEOS	HNS	1.8 km	MPC · JPL
288202	2003 YS_{10}	—	December 17, 2003	Socorro	LINEAR	·	2.6 km	MPC · JPL
288203	2003 YF_{11}	—	December 17, 2003	Socorro	LINEAR	·	2.4 km	MPC · JPL
288204	2003 YM_{12}	—	December 17, 2003	Socorro	LINEAR	CYB	5.4 km	MPC · JPL
288205	2003 YS_{13}	—	December 17, 2003	Anderson Mesa	LONEOS	·	2.8 km	MPC · JPL
288206	2003 YN_{19}	—	December 17, 2003	Kitt Peak	Spacewatch	EUN	1.8 km	MPC · JPL
288207	2003 YK_{25}	—	December 18, 2003	Socorro	LINEAR	·	1.9 km	MPC · JPL
288208	2003 YN_{25}	—	December 18, 2003	Socorro	LINEAR	EUN	1.9 km	MPC · JPL
288209	2003 YM_{29}	—	December 17, 2003	Kitt Peak	Spacewatch	·	1.1 km	MPC · JPL
288210	2003 YF_{30}	—	December 18, 2003	Socorro	LINEAR	(5)	1.2 km	MPC · JPL
288211	2003 YR_{30}	—	December 18, 2003	Socorro	LINEAR	·	1.5 km	MPC · JPL
288212	2003 YL_{31}	—	December 18, 2003	Socorro	LINEAR	NYS	1.1 km	MPC · JPL
288213	2003 YE_{34}	—	December 17, 2003	Kitt Peak	Spacewatch	·	2.1 km	MPC · JPL
288214	2003 YJ_{34}	—	December 17, 2003	Kitt Peak	Spacewatch	ADE	2.4 km	MPC · JPL
288215	2003 YV_{37}	—	December 18, 2003	Socorro	LINEAR	EOS	2.9 km	MPC · JPL
288216	2003 YJ_{41}	—	December 19, 2003	Kitt Peak	Spacewatch	·	1.4 km	MPC · JPL
288217	2003 YK_{41}	—	December 19, 2003	Kitt Peak	Spacewatch	·	2.2 km	MPC · JPL
288218	2003 YC_{42}	—	December 19, 2003	Kitt Peak	Spacewatch	·	1.1 km	MPC · JPL
288219	2003 YP_{44}	—	December 19, 2003	Kitt Peak	Spacewatch	(69559)	4.2 km	MPC · JPL
288220	2003 YX_{44}	—	December 20, 2003	Socorro	LINEAR	V	910 m	MPC · JPL
288221	2003 YK_{45}	—	December 17, 2003	Kitt Peak	Spacewatch	·	2.5 km	MPC · JPL
288222	2003 YK_{55}	—	December 19, 2003	Socorro	LINEAR	·	2.1 km	MPC · JPL
288223	2003 YW_{58}	—	December 19, 2003	Socorro	LINEAR	·	1.9 km	MPC · JPL
288224	2003 YV_{59}	—	December 19, 2003	Kitt Peak	Spacewatch	·	1.1 km	MPC · JPL
288225	2003 YA_{63}	—	December 19, 2003	Socorro	LINEAR	(5)	2.2 km	MPC · JPL
288226	2003 YL_{67}	—	December 19, 2003	Kitt Peak	Spacewatch	·	2.1 km	MPC · JPL
288227	2003 YA_{68}	—	December 19, 2003	Kitt Peak	Spacewatch	·	1.6 km	MPC · JPL
288228	2003 YR_{69}	—	December 21, 2003	Kitt Peak	Spacewatch	·	990 m	MPC · JPL
288229	2003 YV_{69}	—	December 21, 2003	Kitt Peak	Spacewatch	(5)	1.5 km	MPC · JPL
288230	2003 YH_{71}	—	December 18, 2003	Socorro	LINEAR	NYS	1.2 km	MPC · JPL
288231	2003 YR_{71}	—	December 18, 2003	Socorro	LINEAR	HNS	1.8 km	MPC · JPL
288232	2003 YY_{71}	—	December 18, 2003	Socorro	LINEAR	EUN	1.7 km	MPC · JPL
288233	2003 YD_{72}	—	December 18, 2003	Socorro	LINEAR	·	2.0 km	MPC · JPL
288234	2003 YJ_{78}	—	December 18, 2003	Socorro	LINEAR	·	3.4 km	MPC · JPL
288235	2003 YJ_{79}	—	December 18, 2003	Socorro	LINEAR	·	3.3 km	MPC · JPL
288236	2003 YS_{79}	—	December 18, 2003	Socorro	LINEAR	·	1.6 km	MPC · JPL
288237	2003 YN_{82}	—	December 18, 2003	Socorro	LINEAR	·	1.3 km	MPC · JPL
288238	2003 YK_{89}	—	December 19, 2003	Socorro	LINEAR	·	2.3 km	MPC · JPL
288239	2003 YQ_{91}	—	December 20, 2003	Socorro	LINEAR	·	3.3 km	MPC · JPL
288240	2003 YD_{94}	—	December 21, 2003	Kitt Peak	Spacewatch	·	4.3 km	MPC · JPL
288241	2003 YL_{94}	—	December 22, 2003	Socorro	LINEAR	BRA	2.5 km	MPC · JPL
288242	2003 YT_{98}	—	December 19, 2003	Socorro	LINEAR	NYS	1.3 km	MPC · JPL
288243	2003 YP_{100}	—	December 19, 2003	Socorro	LINEAR	NYS	1.2 km	MPC · JPL
288244	2003 YY_{100}	—	December 19, 2003	Socorro	LINEAR	·	1.6 km	MPC · JPL
288245	2003 YW_{102}	—	December 19, 2003	Socorro	LINEAR	·	1.0 km	MPC · JPL
288246	2003 YK_{105}	—	December 22, 2003	Socorro	LINEAR	·	2.3 km	MPC · JPL
288247	2003 YD_{112}	—	December 23, 2003	Socorro	LINEAR	(5)	1.5 km	MPC · JPL
288248	2003 YO_{113}	—	December 23, 2003	Socorro	LINEAR	·	1.8 km	MPC · JPL
288249	2003 YP_{113}	—	December 23, 2003	Socorro	LINEAR	·	1.9 km	MPC · JPL
288250	2003 YY_{118}	—	December 27, 2003	Kitt Peak	Spacewatch	·	1.8 km	MPC · JPL
288251	2003 YJ_{119}	—	December 27, 2003	Socorro	LINEAR	·	2.4 km	MPC · JPL
288252	2003 YB_{121}	—	December 27, 2003	Socorro	LINEAR	EUN	1.5 km	MPC · JPL
288253	2003 YX_{122}	—	December 27, 2003	Socorro	LINEAR	NYS	1.5 km	MPC · JPL
288254	2003 YV_{124}	—	December 29, 2003	Socorro	LINEAR	H	710 m	MPC · JPL
288255	2003 YU_{126}	—	December 27, 2003	Socorro	LINEAR	·	1.4 km	MPC · JPL
288256	2003 YN_{127}	—	December 27, 2003	Socorro	LINEAR	·	4.0 km	MPC · JPL
288257	2003 YC_{129}	—	December 27, 2003	Socorro	LINEAR	JUN	1.5 km	MPC · JPL
288258	2003 YA_{136}	—	December 28, 2003	Kitt Peak	Spacewatch	·	1.7 km	MPC · JPL
288259	2003 YL_{137}	—	December 27, 2003	Socorro	LINEAR	fast	2.4 km	MPC · JPL
288260	2003 YF_{138}	—	December 27, 2003	Socorro	LINEAR	MAS	1.1 km	MPC · JPL
288261	2003 YC_{142}	—	December 28, 2003	Socorro	LINEAR	·	2.2 km	MPC · JPL
288262	2003 YZ_{142}	—	December 28, 2003	Socorro	LINEAR	EOS	2.5 km	MPC · JPL
288263	2003 YG_{145}	—	December 28, 2003	Socorro	LINEAR	·	2.9 km	MPC · JPL
288264	2003 YL_{145}	—	December 28, 2003	Socorro	LINEAR	TIR	3.7 km	MPC · JPL
288265	2003 YR_{150}	—	December 29, 2003	Catalina	CSS	EOS	2.4 km	MPC · JPL
288266	2003 YH_{154}	—	December 29, 2003	Socorro	LINEAR	EUN	2.0 km	MPC · JPL
288267	2003 YP_{155}	—	December 23, 2003	Socorro	LINEAR	·	2.6 km	MPC · JPL
288268	2003 YH_{157}	—	December 16, 2003	Kitt Peak	Spacewatch	DOR	3.1 km	MPC · JPL
288269	2003 YC_{158}	—	December 17, 2003	Socorro	LINEAR	·	5.2 km	MPC · JPL
288270	2003 YD_{161}	—	December 17, 2003	Kitt Peak	Spacewatch	·	990 m	MPC · JPL
288271	2003 YD_{163}	—	December 17, 2003	Socorro	LINEAR	EUN	1.9 km	MPC · JPL
288272	2003 YN_{163}	—	December 17, 2003	Kitt Peak	Spacewatch	·	970 m	MPC · JPL
288273	2003 YV_{163}	—	December 17, 2003	Kitt Peak	Spacewatch	BRG	1.8 km	MPC · JPL
288274	2003 YH_{167}	—	December 17, 2003	Kitt Peak	Spacewatch	·	2.2 km	MPC · JPL
288275	2003 YS_{169}	—	December 18, 2003	Socorro	LINEAR	·	3.8 km	MPC · JPL
288276	2003 YC_{172}	—	December 18, 2003	Kitt Peak	Spacewatch	EMA	5.4 km	MPC · JPL
288277	2003 YD_{172}	—	December 18, 2003	Kitt Peak	Spacewatch	·	2.3 km	MPC · JPL
288278	2003 YJ_{173}	—	December 19, 2003	Kitt Peak	Spacewatch	AGN	1.4 km	MPC · JPL
288279	2004 AX	—	January 12, 2004	Palomar	NEAT	·	2.5 km	MPC · JPL
288280	2004 AA_{2}	—	January 13, 2004	Anderson Mesa	LONEOS	PHO	1.3 km	MPC · JPL
288281	2004 AE_{2}	—	January 13, 2004	Anderson Mesa	LONEOS	(2076)	820 m	MPC · JPL
288282	2004 AH_{4}	—	January 15, 2004	Kitt Peak	Spacewatch	L5	15 km	MPC · JPL
288283	2004 AF_{10}	—	January 15, 2004	Kitt Peak	Spacewatch	·	4.3 km	MPC · JPL
288284	2004 AM_{10}	—	January 15, 2004	Kitt Peak	Spacewatch	HNS	1.7 km	MPC · JPL
288285	2004 AZ_{11}	—	January 13, 2004	Anderson Mesa	LONEOS	·	3.8 km	MPC · JPL
288286	2004 AT_{12}	—	January 13, 2004	Kitt Peak	Spacewatch	EOS	4.1 km	MPC · JPL
288287	2004 AB_{13}	—	January 13, 2004	Kitt Peak	Spacewatch	·	2.2 km	MPC · JPL
288288	2004 AO_{19}	—	January 15, 2004	Kitt Peak	Spacewatch	·	1.7 km	MPC · JPL
288289	2004 AM_{20}	—	January 15, 2004	Kitt Peak	Spacewatch	HOF	2.6 km	MPC · JPL
288290	2004 AG_{21}	—	January 15, 2004	Kitt Peak	Spacewatch	·	1.6 km	MPC · JPL
288291	2004 AL_{22}	—	January 15, 2004	Kitt Peak	Spacewatch	·	1.8 km	MPC · JPL
288292	2004 AF_{24}	—	January 15, 2004	Kitt Peak	Spacewatch	V	1.1 km	MPC · JPL
288293	2004 AC_{25}	—	January 15, 2004	Kitt Peak	Spacewatch	·	1.8 km	MPC · JPL
288294	2004 BY	—	January 16, 2004	Kitt Peak	Spacewatch	·	1.9 km	MPC · JPL
288295	2004 BU_{5}	—	January 16, 2004	Kitt Peak	Spacewatch	·	2.0 km	MPC · JPL
288296	2004 BD_{6}	—	January 16, 2004	Kitt Peak	Spacewatch	·	1.2 km	MPC · JPL
288297	2004 BD_{8}	—	January 17, 2004	Kitt Peak	Spacewatch	·	1.4 km	MPC · JPL
288298	2004 BE_{10}	—	January 16, 2004	Palomar	NEAT	·	2.0 km	MPC · JPL
288299	2004 BB_{11}	—	January 16, 2004	Palomar	NEAT	H	720 m	MPC · JPL
288300	2004 BF_{14}	—	January 17, 2004	Haleakala	NEAT	GEF	2.0 km	MPC · JPL

== 288301–288400 ==
back to top

Designation			Discovery			Properties		Ref
Permanent	Provisional	Named after	Date	Site	Discoverer(s)	Category	Diam.	Ref
288301	2004 BF_{16}	—	January 18, 2004	Palomar	NEAT	·	2.0 km	MPC · JPL
288302	2004 BU_{20}	—	January 16, 2004	Kitt Peak	Spacewatch	·	1.6 km	MPC · JPL
288303	2004 BP_{21}	—	January 18, 2004	Palomar	NEAT	·	2.7 km	MPC · JPL
288304	2004 BS_{22}	—	January 17, 2004	Palomar	NEAT	·	2.6 km	MPC · JPL
288305	2004 BE_{23}	—	January 17, 2004	Haleakala	NEAT	·	2.7 km	MPC · JPL
288306	2004 BZ_{25}	—	January 18, 2004	Needville	J. Dellinger	TIR	2.9 km	MPC · JPL
288307	2004 BY_{31}	—	January 19, 2004	Anderson Mesa	LONEOS	·	2.7 km	MPC · JPL
288308	2004 BX_{32}	—	January 19, 2004	Kitt Peak	Spacewatch	JUN	1.6 km	MPC · JPL
288309	2004 BJ_{33}	—	January 19, 2004	Kitt Peak	Spacewatch	·	1.9 km	MPC · JPL
288310	2004 BX_{33}	—	January 19, 2004	Kitt Peak	Spacewatch	HOF	2.8 km	MPC · JPL
288311	2004 BV_{34}	—	January 19, 2004	Kitt Peak	Spacewatch	(29841)	1.8 km	MPC · JPL
288312	2004 BO_{35}	—	January 19, 2004	Kitt Peak	Spacewatch	·	3.0 km	MPC · JPL
288313	2004 BC_{36}	—	January 19, 2004	Kitt Peak	Spacewatch	·	2.6 km	MPC · JPL
288314	2004 BS_{36}	—	January 19, 2004	Kitt Peak	Spacewatch	V	900 m	MPC · JPL
288315	2004 BM_{37}	—	January 19, 2004	Kitt Peak	Spacewatch	·	1.1 km	MPC · JPL
288316	2004 BH_{39}	—	January 21, 2004	Socorro	LINEAR	L5	15 km	MPC · JPL
288317	2004 BO_{47}	—	January 21, 2004	Socorro	LINEAR	·	1.9 km	MPC · JPL
288318	2004 BF_{49}	—	January 21, 2004	Socorro	LINEAR	ERI	1.5 km	MPC · JPL
288319	2004 BK_{51}	—	January 21, 2004	Socorro	LINEAR	NEM	2.9 km	MPC · JPL
288320	2004 BT_{51}	—	January 21, 2004	Socorro	LINEAR	·	3.2 km	MPC · JPL
288321	2004 BM_{53}	—	January 22, 2004	Socorro	LINEAR	AGN	1.4 km	MPC · JPL
288322	2004 BU_{53}	—	January 22, 2004	Socorro	LINEAR	·	1.4 km	MPC · JPL
288323	2004 BY_{54}	—	January 22, 2004	Socorro	LINEAR	·	6.0 km	MPC · JPL
288324	2004 BS_{58}	—	January 24, 2004	Socorro	LINEAR	·	1.7 km	MPC · JPL
288325	2004 BB_{61}	—	January 21, 2004	Socorro	LINEAR	·	2.6 km	MPC · JPL
288326	2004 BF_{61}	—	January 21, 2004	Socorro	LINEAR	·	710 m	MPC · JPL
288327	2004 BG_{62}	—	January 22, 2004	Socorro	LINEAR	MAS	780 m	MPC · JPL
288328	2004 BO_{65}	—	January 22, 2004	Socorro	LINEAR	AGN	1.5 km	MPC · JPL
288329	2004 BS_{66}	—	January 22, 2004	Socorro	LINEAR	·	2.0 km	MPC · JPL
288330	2004 BL_{67}	—	January 24, 2004	Socorro	LINEAR	·	3.9 km	MPC · JPL
288331	2004 BJ_{68}	—	January 16, 2004	Palomar	NEAT	H	680 m	MPC · JPL
288332	2004 BB_{70}	—	January 22, 2004	Socorro	LINEAR	·	2.2 km	MPC · JPL
288333	2004 BG_{75}	—	January 22, 2004	Socorro	LINEAR	·	2.3 km	MPC · JPL
288334	2004 BX_{78}	—	January 22, 2004	Socorro	LINEAR	NEM	2.4 km	MPC · JPL
288335	2004 BH_{80}	—	January 24, 2004	Socorro	LINEAR	·	1.9 km	MPC · JPL
288336	2004 BT_{80}	—	January 24, 2004	Socorro	LINEAR	·	1.6 km	MPC · JPL
288337	2004 BG_{88}	—	January 23, 2004	Socorro	LINEAR	·	3.7 km	MPC · JPL
288338	2004 BW_{89}	—	January 23, 2004	Socorro	LINEAR	·	4.8 km	MPC · JPL
288339	2004 BD_{95}	—	January 28, 2004	Socorro	LINEAR	·	2.6 km	MPC · JPL
288340	2004 BZ_{97}	—	January 27, 2004	Kitt Peak	Spacewatch	DOR	4.0 km	MPC · JPL
288341	2004 BX_{99}	—	January 27, 2004	Kitt Peak	Spacewatch	·	2.3 km	MPC · JPL
288342	2004 BT_{103}	—	January 23, 2004	Socorro	LINEAR	HNS	1.6 km	MPC · JPL
288343	2004 BG_{114}	—	January 29, 2004	Catalina	CSS	·	3.2 km	MPC · JPL
288344	2004 BH_{117}	—	January 28, 2004	Catalina	CSS	·	2.6 km	MPC · JPL
288345	2004 BA_{120}	—	January 30, 2004	Catalina	CSS	·	1.9 km	MPC · JPL
288346	2004 BO_{124}	—	January 16, 2004	Palomar	NEAT	·	3.8 km	MPC · JPL
288347	2004 BS_{129}	—	January 16, 2004	Kitt Peak	Spacewatch	·	980 m	MPC · JPL
288348	2004 BD_{132}	—	January 16, 2004	Kitt Peak	Spacewatch	·	950 m	MPC · JPL
288349	2004 BM_{132}	—	January 17, 2004	Palomar	NEAT	·	3.1 km	MPC · JPL
288350	2004 BQ_{136}	—	January 19, 2004	Kitt Peak	Spacewatch	·	2.0 km	MPC · JPL
288351	2004 BO_{145}	—	January 19, 2004	Kitt Peak	Spacewatch	·	1.7 km	MPC · JPL
288352	2004 BW_{145}	—	January 21, 2004	Socorro	LINEAR	·	2.4 km	MPC · JPL
288353	2004 BO_{146}	—	January 22, 2004	Socorro	LINEAR	·	4.0 km	MPC · JPL
288354	2004 BP_{146}	—	January 22, 2004	Socorro	LINEAR	·	2.2 km	MPC · JPL
288355	2004 BX_{147}	—	January 16, 2004	Palomar	NEAT	WIT	1.4 km	MPC · JPL
288356	2004 BB_{154}	—	January 28, 2004	Kitt Peak	Spacewatch	·	2.6 km	MPC · JPL
288357	2004 BO_{154}	—	January 28, 2004	Kitt Peak	Spacewatch	NYS	860 m	MPC · JPL
288358	2004 CF_{1}	—	February 2, 2004	Socorro	LINEAR	EUN	1.8 km	MPC · JPL
288359	2004 CN_{5}	—	February 10, 2004	Palomar	NEAT	V	950 m	MPC · JPL
288360	2004 CF_{10}	—	February 11, 2004	Kitt Peak	Spacewatch	·	2.7 km	MPC · JPL
288361	2004 CD_{11}	—	February 11, 2004	Palomar	NEAT	·	3.3 km	MPC · JPL
288362	2004 CK_{11}	—	February 11, 2004	Palomar	NEAT	·	910 m	MPC · JPL
288363	2004 CN_{11}	—	February 11, 2004	Palomar	NEAT	·	1.1 km	MPC · JPL
288364	2004 CR_{11}	—	February 11, 2004	Palomar	NEAT	·	2.1 km	MPC · JPL
288365	2004 CH_{13}	—	February 11, 2004	Palomar	NEAT	EOS	3.6 km	MPC · JPL
288366	2004 CB_{15}	—	February 11, 2004	Kitt Peak	Spacewatch	·	1.5 km	MPC · JPL
288367	2004 CJ_{17}	—	February 11, 2004	Palomar	NEAT	·	4.0 km	MPC · JPL
288368	2004 CG_{18}	—	February 10, 2004	Catalina	CSS	·	1.1 km	MPC · JPL
288369	2004 CK_{19}	—	February 11, 2004	Kitt Peak	Spacewatch	·	1.7 km	MPC · JPL
288370	2004 CH_{20}	—	February 11, 2004	Kitt Peak	Spacewatch	·	1.9 km	MPC · JPL
288371	2004 CM_{20}	—	February 11, 2004	Kitt Peak	Spacewatch	·	3.0 km	MPC · JPL
288372	2004 CV_{22}	—	February 12, 2004	Kitt Peak	Spacewatch	MRX	1.2 km	MPC · JPL
288373	2004 CA_{25}	—	February 12, 2004	Palomar	NEAT	GEF	1.5 km	MPC · JPL
288374	2004 CF_{26}	—	February 11, 2004	Kitt Peak	Spacewatch	VER	4.1 km	MPC · JPL
288375	2004 CM_{29}	—	February 12, 2004	Kitt Peak	Spacewatch	·	2.2 km	MPC · JPL
288376	2004 CB_{30}	—	February 12, 2004	Kitt Peak	Spacewatch	·	4.5 km	MPC · JPL
288377	2004 CK_{36}	—	February 11, 2004	Palomar	NEAT	·	5.5 km	MPC · JPL
288378	2004 CH_{39}	—	February 10, 2004	Palomar	NEAT	·	6.6 km	MPC · JPL
288379	2004 CA_{50}	—	February 11, 2004	Palomar	NEAT	H · slow	700 m	MPC · JPL
288380	2004 CR_{52}	—	February 11, 2004	Palomar	NEAT	·	3.1 km	MPC · JPL
288381	2004 CZ_{68}	—	February 11, 2004	Kitt Peak	Spacewatch	·	1.4 km	MPC · JPL
288382	2004 CY_{73}	—	February 15, 2004	Haleakala	NEAT	·	2.5 km	MPC · JPL
288383	2004 CS_{74}	—	February 11, 2004	Catalina	CSS	·	1.3 km	MPC · JPL
288384	2004 CP_{75}	—	February 11, 2004	Kitt Peak	Spacewatch	V	1.1 km	MPC · JPL
288385	2004 CB_{76}	—	February 11, 2004	Kitt Peak	Spacewatch	MRX · fast	1.5 km	MPC · JPL
288386	2004 CV_{80}	—	February 11, 2004	Kitt Peak	Spacewatch	·	1.7 km	MPC · JPL
288387	2004 CX_{80}	—	February 11, 2004	Kitt Peak	Spacewatch	·	3.5 km	MPC · JPL
288388	2004 CR_{82}	—	February 12, 2004	Kitt Peak	Spacewatch	·	1.8 km	MPC · JPL
288389	2004 CW_{82}	—	February 12, 2004	Kitt Peak	Spacewatch	·	2.7 km	MPC · JPL
288390	2004 CS_{83}	—	February 12, 2004	Kitt Peak	Spacewatch	·	2.3 km	MPC · JPL
288391	2004 CT_{85}	—	February 14, 2004	Kitt Peak	Spacewatch	·	1.3 km	MPC · JPL
288392	2004 CU_{88}	—	February 11, 2004	Kitt Peak	Spacewatch	·	2.2 km	MPC · JPL
288393	2004 CN_{104}	—	February 13, 2004	Palomar	NEAT	ADE	2.8 km	MPC · JPL
288394	2004 CG_{115}	—	February 14, 2004	Anderson Mesa	LONEOS	JUN	1.5 km	MPC · JPL
288395	2004 CS_{117}	—	February 11, 2004	Kitt Peak	Spacewatch	·	2.0 km	MPC · JPL
288396	2004 CO_{120}	—	February 12, 2004	Kitt Peak	Spacewatch	·	1.6 km	MPC · JPL
288397	2004 CN_{123}	—	February 12, 2004	Kitt Peak	Spacewatch	·	1.1 km	MPC · JPL
288398	2004 CU_{125}	—	February 12, 2004	Kitt Peak	Spacewatch	·	1.3 km	MPC · JPL
288399	2004 CZ_{125}	—	February 12, 2004	Kitt Peak	Spacewatch	·	1.3 km	MPC · JPL
288400	2004 DO_{3}	—	February 16, 2004	Socorro	LINEAR	·	3.9 km	MPC · JPL

== 288401–288500 ==
back to top

Designation			Discovery			Properties		Ref
Permanent	Provisional	Named after	Date	Site	Discoverer(s)	Category	Diam.	Ref
288401	2004 DO_{4}	—	February 16, 2004	Kitt Peak	Spacewatch	·	4.2 km	MPC · JPL
288402	2004 DH_{13}	—	February 16, 2004	Catalina	CSS	·	4.7 km	MPC · JPL
288403	2004 DZ_{14}	—	February 17, 2004	Palomar	NEAT	·	2.5 km	MPC · JPL
288404	2004 DO_{16}	—	February 18, 2004	Kitt Peak	Spacewatch	·	1.5 km	MPC · JPL
288405	2004 DY_{19}	—	February 17, 2004	Catalina	CSS	·	2.1 km	MPC · JPL
288406	2004 DT_{20}	—	February 17, 2004	Catalina	CSS	·	4.3 km	MPC · JPL
288407	2004 DB_{27}	—	February 16, 2004	Kitt Peak	Spacewatch	·	920 m	MPC · JPL
288408	2004 DM_{28}	—	February 17, 2004	Kitt Peak	Spacewatch	THM	3.1 km	MPC · JPL
288409	2004 DU_{28}	—	February 17, 2004	Kitt Peak	Spacewatch	·	2.0 km	MPC · JPL
288410	2004 DN_{33}	—	February 18, 2004	Socorro	LINEAR	·	4.2 km	MPC · JPL
288411	2004 DA_{36}	—	February 19, 2004	Socorro	LINEAR	·	2.6 km	MPC · JPL
288412	2004 DC_{36}	—	February 19, 2004	Socorro	LINEAR	·	2.5 km	MPC · JPL
288413	2004 DG_{43}	—	February 23, 2004	Socorro	LINEAR	·	1.6 km	MPC · JPL
288414	2004 DU_{46}	—	February 19, 2004	Socorro	LINEAR	HNS	1.5 km	MPC · JPL
288415	2004 DO_{50}	—	February 23, 2004	Socorro	LINEAR	·	3.0 km	MPC · JPL
288416	2004 DG_{54}	—	February 22, 2004	Kitt Peak	Spacewatch	·	2.5 km	MPC · JPL
288417	2004 DT_{57}	—	February 23, 2004	Socorro	LINEAR	·	1.0 km	MPC · JPL
288418	2004 DD_{61}	—	February 26, 2004	Socorro	LINEAR	·	4.2 km	MPC · JPL
288419	2004 DA_{63}	—	February 29, 2004	Kitt Peak	Spacewatch	·	2.4 km	MPC · JPL
288420	2004 DW_{64}	—	February 17, 2004	Kitt Peak	Spacewatch	V	710 m	MPC · JPL
288421	2004 DH_{70}	—	February 26, 2004	Kitt Peak	M. W. Buie	MAS	480 m	MPC · JPL
288422	2004 DG_{75}	—	February 17, 2004	Kitt Peak	Spacewatch	·	1.3 km	MPC · JPL
288423	2004 DC_{76}	—	February 17, 2004	Kitt Peak	Spacewatch	·	2.2 km	MPC · JPL
288424	2004 DA_{77}	—	February 18, 2004	Kitt Peak	Spacewatch	·	1.6 km	MPC · JPL
288425	2004 EE	—	March 11, 2004	Wrightwood	J. W. Young	·	3.6 km	MPC · JPL
288426	2004 EM_{8}	—	March 13, 2004	Palomar	NEAT	MAS	800 m	MPC · JPL
288427	2004 EL_{15}	—	March 11, 2004	Palomar	NEAT	·	2.7 km	MPC · JPL
288428	2004 EZ_{16}	—	March 12, 2004	Palomar	NEAT	LIX	3.9 km	MPC · JPL
288429	2004 EE_{19}	—	March 14, 2004	Kitt Peak	Spacewatch	·	3.4 km	MPC · JPL
288430	2004 EQ_{21}	—	March 15, 2004	Valmeca	C. Demeautis, Matter, D.	·	840 m	MPC · JPL
288431	2004 EJ_{23}	—	March 15, 2004	Socorro	LINEAR	NYS	1.2 km	MPC · JPL
288432	2004 ET_{24}	—	March 14, 2004	Socorro	LINEAR	GAL	2.3 km	MPC · JPL
288433	2004 EV_{24}	—	March 12, 2004	Palomar	NEAT	H	760 m	MPC · JPL
288434	2004 EU_{25}	—	March 13, 2004	Palomar	NEAT	EMA	4.7 km	MPC · JPL
288435	2004 EE_{31}	—	March 15, 2004	Catalina	CSS	H	660 m	MPC · JPL
288436	2004 ER_{32}	—	March 15, 2004	Palomar	NEAT	THB	4.0 km	MPC · JPL
288437	2004 ES_{32}	—	March 15, 2004	Palomar	NEAT	·	5.1 km	MPC · JPL
288438	2004 EF_{35}	—	March 12, 2004	Palomar	NEAT	(194)	2.3 km	MPC · JPL
288439	2004 EP_{41}	—	March 15, 2004	Catalina	CSS	·	950 m	MPC · JPL
288440	2004 EM_{43}	—	March 15, 2004	Palomar	NEAT	·	3.1 km	MPC · JPL
288441	2004 EM_{45}	—	March 15, 2004	Kitt Peak	Spacewatch	·	1.8 km	MPC · JPL
288442	2004 ES_{45}	—	March 15, 2004	Kitt Peak	Spacewatch	·	2.6 km	MPC · JPL
288443	2004 EU_{45}	—	March 15, 2004	Kitt Peak	Spacewatch	HIL · 3:2	6.7 km	MPC · JPL
288444	2004 EW_{47}	—	March 15, 2004	Catalina	CSS	LIX	4.0 km	MPC · JPL
288445	2004 EB_{50}	—	March 12, 2004	Palomar	NEAT	NEM	3.0 km	MPC · JPL
288446	2004 EG_{55}	—	March 14, 2004	Palomar	NEAT	EUN	1.7 km	MPC · JPL
288447	2004 EO_{55}	—	March 14, 2004	Palomar	NEAT	·	3.8 km	MPC · JPL
288448	2004 EZ_{55}	—	March 14, 2004	Palomar	NEAT	·	3.2 km	MPC · JPL
288449	2004 EK_{58}	—	March 15, 2004	Socorro	LINEAR	EUN	1.5 km	MPC · JPL
288450	2004 EU_{58}	—	March 15, 2004	Palomar	NEAT	·	5.5 km	MPC · JPL
288451	2004 EG_{61}	—	March 12, 2004	Palomar	NEAT	·	2.3 km	MPC · JPL
288452	2004 EA_{62}	—	March 12, 2004	Palomar	NEAT	·	1.3 km	MPC · JPL
288453	2004 EM_{67}	—	March 15, 2004	Kitt Peak	Spacewatch	·	1.3 km	MPC · JPL
288454	2004 EU_{69}	—	March 15, 2004	Kitt Peak	Spacewatch	·	1.4 km	MPC · JPL
288455	2004 EW_{69}	—	March 15, 2004	Kitt Peak	Spacewatch	·	2.6 km	MPC · JPL
288456	2004 EX_{74}	—	March 14, 2004	Socorro	LINEAR	GEF	1.8 km	MPC · JPL
288457	2004 EE_{75}	—	March 14, 2004	Kitt Peak	Spacewatch	LIX	5.0 km	MPC · JPL
288458	2004 EP_{76}	—	March 15, 2004	Kitt Peak	Spacewatch	·	1.4 km	MPC · JPL
288459	2004 EL_{77}	—	March 15, 2004	Socorro	LINEAR	·	1.5 km	MPC · JPL
288460	2004 EB_{79}	—	March 15, 2004	Kitt Peak	Spacewatch	·	1.8 km	MPC · JPL
288461	2004 EG_{83}	—	March 14, 2004	Kitt Peak	Spacewatch	·	3.6 km	MPC · JPL
288462	2004 EB_{88}	—	March 14, 2004	Kitt Peak	Spacewatch	MAS	750 m	MPC · JPL
288463	2004 EA_{91}	—	March 15, 2004	Kitt Peak	Spacewatch	·	3.2 km	MPC · JPL
288464	2004 EJ_{91}	—	March 15, 2004	Kitt Peak	Spacewatch	MAS	730 m	MPC · JPL
288465	2004 EE_{92}	—	March 15, 2004	Kitt Peak	Spacewatch	·	2.3 km	MPC · JPL
288466	2004 EK_{94}	—	March 15, 2004	Kitt Peak	Spacewatch	·	4.0 km	MPC · JPL
288467	2004 EF_{103}	—	March 15, 2004	Kitt Peak	Spacewatch	AST	1.7 km	MPC · JPL
288468	2004 ER_{111}	—	March 15, 2004	Socorro	LINEAR	·	1.7 km	MPC · JPL
288469	2004 EZ_{112}	—	March 15, 2004	Kitt Peak	Spacewatch	·	3.1 km	MPC · JPL
288470	2004 FJ_{1}	—	March 16, 2004	Socorro	LINEAR	H	490 m	MPC · JPL
288471	2004 FF_{3}	—	March 18, 2004	Modra	Világi, J., L. Kornoš	T_{j} (2.98)	4.0 km	MPC · JPL
288472	2004 FB_{4}	—	March 17, 2004	Bergisch Gladbach	W. Bickel	·	1.1 km	MPC · JPL
288473	2004 FA_{6}	—	March 23, 2004	Emerald Lane	L. Ball	·	1.1 km	MPC · JPL
288474	2004 FE_{6}	—	March 24, 2004	Wrightwood	J. W. Young	KOR	1.5 km	MPC · JPL
288475	2004 FO_{12}	—	March 16, 2004	Socorro	LINEAR	·	3.0 km	MPC · JPL
288476	2004 FP_{13}	—	March 16, 2004	Kitt Peak	Spacewatch	·	2.3 km	MPC · JPL
288477	2004 FJ_{15}	—	March 16, 2004	Siding Spring	SSS	·	4.7 km	MPC · JPL
288478 Fahlman	2004 FA_{17}	Fahlman	March 16, 2004	Mauna Kea	D. D. Balam	DOR	2.7 km	MPC · JPL
288479	2004 FX_{17}	—	March 27, 2004	Socorro	LINEAR	H	740 m	MPC · JPL
288480	2004 FJ_{20}	—	March 16, 2004	Socorro	LINEAR	MAR	1.4 km	MPC · JPL
288481	2004 FL_{22}	—	March 16, 2004	Siding Spring	SSS	EUN	1.7 km	MPC · JPL
288482	2004 FQ_{22}	—	March 16, 2004	Campo Imperatore	CINEOS	SUL	2.3 km	MPC · JPL
288483	2004 FY_{22}	—	March 17, 2004	Kitt Peak	Spacewatch	NEM	2.5 km	MPC · JPL
288484	2004 FW_{23}	—	March 17, 2004	Kitt Peak	Spacewatch	·	1.9 km	MPC · JPL
288485	2004 FP_{26}	—	March 17, 2004	Kitt Peak	Spacewatch	·	740 m	MPC · JPL
288486	2004 FK_{27}	—	March 17, 2004	Kitt Peak	Spacewatch	·	1.8 km	MPC · JPL
288487	2004 FQ_{30}	—	March 23, 2004	Catalina	CSS	·	3.8 km	MPC · JPL
288488	2004 FH_{35}	—	March 16, 2004	Kitt Peak	Spacewatch	·	5.0 km	MPC · JPL
288489	2004 FN_{41}	—	March 18, 2004	Kitt Peak	Spacewatch	GEF	1.6 km	MPC · JPL
288490	2004 FZ_{41}	—	March 16, 2004	Socorro	LINEAR	·	2.7 km	MPC · JPL
288491	2004 FE_{45}	—	March 16, 2004	Socorro	LINEAR	·	1.5 km	MPC · JPL
288492	2004 FQ_{47}	—	March 18, 2004	Socorro	LINEAR	·	1.2 km	MPC · JPL
288493	2004 FU_{48}	—	March 18, 2004	Socorro	LINEAR	·	5.7 km	MPC · JPL
288494	2004 FD_{49}	—	March 18, 2004	Socorro	LINEAR	·	2.3 km	MPC · JPL
288495	2004 FT_{51}	—	March 19, 2004	Socorro	LINEAR	(18466)	3.1 km	MPC · JPL
288496	2004 FG_{54}	—	March 18, 2004	Socorro	LINEAR	·	1.0 km	MPC · JPL
288497	2004 FU_{58}	—	March 17, 2004	Kitt Peak	Spacewatch	·	1.8 km	MPC · JPL
288498	2004 FE_{61}	—	March 19, 2004	Socorro	LINEAR	T_{j} (2.99) · EUP	4.1 km	MPC · JPL
288499	2004 FO_{61}	—	March 19, 2004	Socorro	LINEAR	·	1.6 km	MPC · JPL
288500	2004 FG_{72}	—	March 17, 2004	Kitt Peak	Spacewatch	(7744)	1.9 km	MPC · JPL

== 288501–288600 ==
back to top

Designation			Discovery			Properties		Ref
Permanent	Provisional	Named after	Date	Site	Discoverer(s)	Category	Diam.	Ref
288501	2004 FW_{82}	—	March 17, 2004	Kitt Peak	Spacewatch	·	1.6 km	MPC · JPL
288502	2004 FM_{85}	—	March 18, 2004	Kitt Peak	Spacewatch	·	1.6 km	MPC · JPL
288503	2004 FL_{86}	—	March 19, 2004	Palomar	NEAT	·	1.7 km	MPC · JPL
288504	2004 FF_{92}	—	March 17, 2004	Palomar	NEAT	PHO	1.2 km	MPC · JPL
288505	2004 FT_{93}	—	March 22, 2004	Socorro	LINEAR	·	2.3 km	MPC · JPL
288506	2004 FO_{98}	—	March 19, 2004	Socorro	LINEAR	·	3.4 km	MPC · JPL
288507	2004 FH_{101}	—	March 23, 2004	Kitt Peak	Spacewatch	·	2.9 km	MPC · JPL
288508	2004 FB_{106}	—	March 26, 2004	Kitt Peak	Spacewatch	V	820 m	MPC · JPL
288509	2004 FH_{106}	—	March 18, 2004	Socorro	LINEAR	·	3.0 km	MPC · JPL
288510	2004 FA_{107}	—	March 20, 2004	Socorro	LINEAR	·	2.4 km	MPC · JPL
288511	2004 FS_{108}	—	March 23, 2004	Kitt Peak	Spacewatch	(13314)	2.2 km	MPC · JPL
288512	2004 FF_{112}	—	March 26, 2004	Kitt Peak	Spacewatch	(18466)	2.2 km	MPC · JPL
288513	2004 FQ_{116}	—	March 23, 2004	Socorro	LINEAR	·	850 m	MPC · JPL
288514	2004 FE_{118}	—	March 22, 2004	Socorro	LINEAR	·	1.7 km	MPC · JPL
288515	2004 FG_{121}	—	March 23, 2004	Socorro	LINEAR	EOS	2.8 km	MPC · JPL
288516	2004 FU_{122}	—	March 26, 2004	Socorro	LINEAR	TIR	3.4 km	MPC · JPL
288517	2004 FZ_{123}	—	March 26, 2004	Catalina	CSS	·	3.0 km	MPC · JPL
288518	2004 FU_{136}	—	March 28, 2004	Socorro	LINEAR	EUN	1.9 km	MPC · JPL
288519	2004 FR_{137}	—	March 29, 2004	Kitt Peak	Spacewatch	·	1.1 km	MPC · JPL
288520	2004 FJ_{138}	—	March 29, 2004	Kitt Peak	Spacewatch	·	3.2 km	MPC · JPL
288521	2004 FC_{142}	—	March 27, 2004	Socorro	LINEAR	·	2.7 km	MPC · JPL
288522	2004 FK_{143}	—	March 28, 2004	Kitt Peak	Spacewatch	PHO	1.3 km	MPC · JPL
288523	2004 FR_{147}	—	March 16, 2004	Haleakala	NEAT	·	2.6 km	MPC · JPL
288524	2004 FU_{147}	—	March 16, 2004	Palomar	NEAT	·	6.0 km	MPC · JPL
288525	2004 FT_{156}	—	March 17, 2004	Kitt Peak	Spacewatch	·	2.6 km	MPC · JPL
288526	2004 FE_{165}	—	March 29, 2004	Catalina	CSS	·	4.4 km	MPC · JPL
288527	2004 FH_{165}	—	March 17, 2004	Palomar	NEAT	PHO	1.4 km	MPC · JPL
288528	2004 FM_{166}	—	March 25, 2004	Siding Spring	SSS	·	4.6 km	MPC · JPL
288529	2004 GZ_{6}	—	April 12, 2004	Kitt Peak	Spacewatch	·	2.0 km	MPC · JPL
288530	2004 GS_{8}	—	April 12, 2004	Kitt Peak	Spacewatch	·	1.7 km	MPC · JPL
288531	2004 GT_{8}	—	April 12, 2004	Palomar	NEAT	·	2.1 km	MPC · JPL
288532	2004 GK_{9}	—	April 12, 2004	Kitt Peak	Spacewatch	·	4.1 km	MPC · JPL
288533	2004 GX_{9}	—	April 13, 2004	Mount Graham	Ryan, W. H., Jamieson, Q.	·	1.9 km	MPC · JPL
288534	2004 GF_{12}	—	April 9, 2004	Siding Spring	SSS	TIR	4.1 km	MPC · JPL
288535	2004 GJ_{13}	—	April 12, 2004	Siding Spring	SSS	·	4.4 km	MPC · JPL
288536	2004 GV_{19}	—	April 15, 2004	Socorro	LINEAR	·	4.8 km	MPC · JPL
288537	2004 GQ_{20}	—	April 10, 2004	Palomar	NEAT	·	2.0 km	MPC · JPL
288538	2004 GJ_{23}	—	April 12, 2004	Kitt Peak	Spacewatch	·	830 m	MPC · JPL
288539	2004 GU_{23}	—	April 13, 2004	Catalina	CSS	·	1.2 km	MPC · JPL
288540	2004 GX_{23}	—	April 13, 2004	Catalina	CSS	·	2.0 km	MPC · JPL
288541	2004 GV_{25}	—	April 14, 2004	Kitt Peak	Spacewatch	·	760 m	MPC · JPL
288542	2004 GL_{28}	—	April 14, 2004	Socorro	LINEAR	·	2.3 km	MPC · JPL
288543	2004 GV_{31}	—	April 15, 2004	Anderson Mesa	LONEOS	MAS	880 m	MPC · JPL
288544	2004 GZ_{31}	—	April 11, 2004	Palomar	NEAT	·	1.6 km	MPC · JPL
288545	2004 GL_{32}	—	April 12, 2004	Palomar	NEAT	·	3.5 km	MPC · JPL
288546	2004 GN_{34}	—	April 13, 2004	Palomar	NEAT	·	4.7 km	MPC · JPL
288547	2004 GF_{42}	—	April 14, 2004	Kitt Peak	Spacewatch	·	1.0 km	MPC · JPL
288548	2004 GC_{44}	—	April 12, 2004	Kitt Peak	Spacewatch	·	1.3 km	MPC · JPL
288549	2004 GU_{44}	—	April 12, 2004	Kitt Peak	Spacewatch	·	2.8 km	MPC · JPL
288550	2004 GJ_{49}	—	April 12, 2004	Kitt Peak	Spacewatch	·	1.9 km	MPC · JPL
288551	2004 GF_{50}	—	April 12, 2004	Kitt Peak	Spacewatch	·	1.6 km	MPC · JPL
288552	2004 GG_{57}	—	April 14, 2004	Kitt Peak	Spacewatch	MAS	780 m	MPC · JPL
288553	2004 GG_{62}	—	April 13, 2004	Kitt Peak	Spacewatch	THM	2.6 km	MPC · JPL
288554	2004 GH_{62}	—	April 13, 2004	Kitt Peak	Spacewatch	·	2.8 km	MPC · JPL
288555	2004 GY_{73}	—	April 15, 2004	Reedy Creek	J. Broughton	·	2.3 km	MPC · JPL
288556	2004 GC_{87}	—	April 14, 2004	Siding Spring	SSS	·	1.7 km	MPC · JPL
288557	2004 HQ	—	April 16, 2004	Socorro	LINEAR	H	830 m	MPC · JPL
288558	2004 HV	—	April 17, 2004	Siding Spring	SSS	T_{j} (2.99)	5.9 km	MPC · JPL
288559	2004 HA_{5}	—	April 16, 2004	Palomar	NEAT	·	3.1 km	MPC · JPL
288560	2004 HR_{6}	—	April 16, 2004	Palomar	NEAT	·	4.9 km	MPC · JPL
288561	2004 HA_{9}	—	April 16, 2004	Socorro	LINEAR	·	880 m	MPC · JPL
288562	2004 HW_{10}	—	April 17, 2004	Anderson Mesa	LONEOS	·	2.0 km	MPC · JPL
288563	2004 HR_{16}	—	April 20, 2004	Socorro	LINEAR	NYS	1.4 km	MPC · JPL
288564	2004 HO_{17}	—	April 17, 2004	Socorro	LINEAR	·	1.6 km	MPC · JPL
288565	2004 HB_{19}	—	April 19, 2004	Socorro	LINEAR	EUP	6.8 km	MPC · JPL
288566	2004 HT_{24}	—	April 19, 2004	Kitt Peak	Spacewatch	·	1.3 km	MPC · JPL
288567	2004 HK_{26}	—	April 19, 2004	Socorro	LINEAR	·	5.8 km	MPC · JPL
288568	2004 HK_{32}	—	April 20, 2004	Kitt Peak	Spacewatch	·	1.2 km	MPC · JPL
288569	2004 HY_{35}	—	April 20, 2004	Siding Spring	SSS	·	1.8 km	MPC · JPL
288570	2004 HD_{37}	—	April 21, 2004	Kitt Peak	Spacewatch	·	810 m	MPC · JPL
288571	2004 HE_{37}	—	April 21, 2004	Kitt Peak	Spacewatch	·	5.3 km	MPC · JPL
288572	2004 HY_{39}	—	April 19, 2004	Kitt Peak	Spacewatch	·	2.4 km	MPC · JPL
288573	2004 HX_{40}	—	April 19, 2004	Kitt Peak	Spacewatch	·	3.4 km	MPC · JPL
288574	2004 HC_{44}	—	April 21, 2004	Socorro	LINEAR	·	2.9 km	MPC · JPL
288575	2004 HO_{50}	—	April 23, 2004	Kitt Peak	Spacewatch	·	1.4 km	MPC · JPL
288576	2004 HR_{51}	—	April 24, 2004	Kitt Peak	Spacewatch	·	1.8 km	MPC · JPL
288577	2004 HB_{59}	—	April 24, 2004	Kitt Peak	Spacewatch	·	1.9 km	MPC · JPL
288578	2004 HJ_{60}	—	April 25, 2004	Catalina	CSS	·	1.1 km	MPC · JPL
288579	2004 HL_{62}	—	April 24, 2004	Catalina	CSS	H	970 m	MPC · JPL
288580	2004 HE_{65}	—	April 16, 2004	Siding Spring	SSS	EUN	1.9 km	MPC · JPL
288581	2004 HV_{65}	—	April 19, 2004	Kitt Peak	Spacewatch	·	1.6 km	MPC · JPL
288582	2004 JL	—	May 9, 2004	Kitt Peak	Spacewatch	·	1.8 km	MPC · JPL
288583	2004 JO	—	May 9, 2004	Kitt Peak	Spacewatch	·	1.9 km	MPC · JPL
288584	2004 JT_{1}	—	May 10, 2004	Reedy Creek	J. Broughton	·	3.6 km	MPC · JPL
288585	2004 JX_{4}	—	May 11, 2004	Siding Spring	SSS	LUT	6.5 km	MPC · JPL
288586	2004 JV_{11}	—	May 13, 2004	Socorro	LINEAR	·	2.0 km	MPC · JPL
288587	2004 JO_{14}	—	May 9, 2004	Kitt Peak	Spacewatch	·	1.7 km	MPC · JPL
288588	2004 JE_{16}	—	May 11, 2004	Anderson Mesa	LONEOS	TIR	3.9 km	MPC · JPL
288589	2004 JH_{16}	—	May 11, 2004	Anderson Mesa	LONEOS	NYS	1.3 km	MPC · JPL
288590	2004 JZ_{16}	—	May 12, 2004	Catalina	CSS	·	4.3 km	MPC · JPL
288591	2004 JJ_{18}	—	May 13, 2004	Kitt Peak	Spacewatch	NYS	1.4 km	MPC · JPL
288592	2004 JW_{20}	—	May 15, 2004	Socorro	LINEAR	ATE	240 m	MPC · JPL
288593	2004 JO_{21}	—	May 9, 2004	Kitt Peak	Spacewatch	·	3.4 km	MPC · JPL
288594	2004 JC_{25}	—	May 15, 2004	Socorro	LINEAR	·	2.4 km	MPC · JPL
288595	2004 JP_{27}	—	May 15, 2004	Socorro	LINEAR	·	5.0 km	MPC · JPL
288596	2004 JQ_{29}	—	May 15, 2004	Socorro	LINEAR	MIS	3.3 km	MPC · JPL
288597	2004 JP_{33}	—	May 15, 2004	Socorro	LINEAR	·	720 m	MPC · JPL
288598	2004 JS_{36}	—	May 13, 2004	Kitt Peak	Spacewatch	AST	1.8 km	MPC · JPL
288599	2004 JM_{41}	—	May 15, 2004	Socorro	LINEAR	·	1.4 km	MPC · JPL
288600	2004 KY_{3}	—	May 16, 2004	Socorro	LINEAR	·	5.2 km	MPC · JPL

== 288601–288700 ==
back to top

Designation			Discovery			Properties		Ref
Permanent	Provisional	Named after	Date	Site	Discoverer(s)	Category	Diam.	Ref
288601	2004 KP_{6}	—	May 18, 2004	Socorro	LINEAR	HYG	4.3 km	MPC · JPL
288602	2004 KK_{9}	—	May 18, 2004	Socorro	LINEAR	·	1.7 km	MPC · JPL
288603	2004 KQ_{18}	—	May 23, 2004	Kitt Peak	Spacewatch	·	2.1 km	MPC · JPL
288604	2004 LJ_{5}	—	June 12, 2004	Catalina	CSS	·	3.4 km	MPC · JPL
288605	2004 LE_{6}	—	June 13, 2004	Palomar	NEAT	·	1.0 km	MPC · JPL
288606	2004 LO_{14}	—	June 11, 2004	Kitt Peak	Spacewatch	MAR	1.1 km	MPC · JPL
288607	2004 LJ_{25}	—	June 15, 2004	Socorro	LINEAR	·	1.1 km	MPC · JPL
288608	2004 LU_{25}	—	June 15, 2004	Socorro	LINEAR	·	990 m	MPC · JPL
288609	2004 LE_{26}	—	June 12, 2004	Socorro	LINEAR	·	1.9 km	MPC · JPL
288610	2004 LG_{31}	—	June 15, 2004	Kitt Peak	Spacewatch	·	3.7 km	MPC · JPL
288611	2004 MS_{7}	—	June 29, 2004	Siding Spring	SSS	EUN	1.9 km	MPC · JPL
288612	2004 NE_{5}	—	July 9, 2004	Socorro	LINEAR	·	3.2 km	MPC · JPL
288613	2004 NQ_{6}	—	July 11, 2004	Socorro	LINEAR	·	3.0 km	MPC · JPL
288614	2004 NB_{8}	—	July 11, 2004	Socorro	LINEAR	INA	3.3 km	MPC · JPL
288615 Tempesti	2004 ND_{9}	Tempesti	July 11, 2004	Vallemare Borbona	V. S. Casulli	·	1.9 km	MPC · JPL
288616	2004 NV_{9}	—	July 9, 2004	Socorro	LINEAR	·	5.9 km	MPC · JPL
288617	2004 NB_{12}	—	July 11, 2004	Socorro	LINEAR	·	990 m	MPC · JPL
288618	2004 NK_{15}	—	July 11, 2004	Socorro	LINEAR	·	870 m	MPC · JPL
288619	2004 NL_{16}	—	July 11, 2004	Socorro	LINEAR	PHO	1.5 km	MPC · JPL
288620	2004 NV_{16}	—	July 11, 2004	Socorro	LINEAR	·	1.3 km	MPC · JPL
288621	2004 NL_{20}	—	July 14, 2004	Socorro	LINEAR	EUN	2.0 km	MPC · JPL
288622	2004 NE_{24}	—	July 14, 2004	Socorro	LINEAR	·	1.1 km	MPC · JPL
288623	2004 OF_{9}	—	July 19, 2004	Anderson Mesa	LONEOS	·	2.8 km	MPC · JPL
288624	2004 OY_{9}	—	July 20, 2004	Reedy Creek	J. Broughton	(5)	1.9 km	MPC · JPL
288625	2004 OT_{14}	—	July 21, 2004	Siding Spring	SSS	·	4.4 km	MPC · JPL
288626	2004 PQ_{4}	—	August 5, 2004	Palomar	NEAT	·	1.1 km	MPC · JPL
288627	2004 PX_{5}	—	August 6, 2004	Palomar	NEAT	·	3.7 km	MPC · JPL
288628	2004 PF_{6}	—	August 6, 2004	Palomar	NEAT	V	890 m	MPC · JPL
288629	2004 PQ_{8}	—	August 6, 2004	Palomar	NEAT	·	870 m	MPC · JPL
288630	2004 PM_{11}	—	August 7, 2004	Palomar	NEAT	AGN	1.6 km	MPC · JPL
288631	2004 PW_{12}	—	August 7, 2004	Palomar	NEAT	·	720 m	MPC · JPL
288632	2004 PJ_{14}	—	August 7, 2004	Palomar	NEAT	·	900 m	MPC · JPL
288633	2004 PT_{21}	—	August 8, 2004	Palomar	NEAT	·	1.3 km	MPC · JPL
288634	2004 PR_{22}	—	August 8, 2004	Socorro	LINEAR	·	850 m	MPC · JPL
288635	2004 PO_{25}	—	August 8, 2004	Socorro	LINEAR	·	1.5 km	MPC · JPL
288636	2004 PU_{27}	—	August 9, 2004	Reedy Creek	J. Broughton	ADE	3.5 km	MPC · JPL
288637	2004 PW_{29}	—	August 7, 2004	Palomar	NEAT	(2076)	1.1 km	MPC · JPL
288638	2004 PJ_{32}	—	August 8, 2004	Socorro	LINEAR	·	970 m	MPC · JPL
288639	2004 PT_{32}	—	August 8, 2004	Socorro	LINEAR	·	3.8 km	MPC · JPL
288640	2004 PC_{33}	—	August 8, 2004	Socorro	LINEAR	·	1.2 km	MPC · JPL
288641	2004 PD_{36}	—	August 9, 2004	Campo Imperatore	CINEOS	MAS	840 m	MPC · JPL
288642	2004 PP_{36}	—	August 9, 2004	Socorro	LINEAR	·	1.7 km	MPC · JPL
288643	2004 PP_{37}	—	August 9, 2004	Socorro	LINEAR	·	3.5 km	MPC · JPL
288644	2004 PT_{37}	—	August 9, 2004	Socorro	LINEAR	·	1.3 km	MPC · JPL
288645	2004 PJ_{38}	—	August 9, 2004	Socorro	LINEAR	·	2.2 km	MPC · JPL
288646	2004 PV_{42}	—	August 9, 2004	Reedy Creek	J. Broughton	(5)	1.8 km	MPC · JPL
288647	2004 PG_{43}	—	August 6, 2004	Palomar	NEAT	·	3.2 km	MPC · JPL
288648	2004 PZ_{43}	—	August 6, 2004	Campo Imperatore	CINEOS	·	2.4 km	MPC · JPL
288649	2004 PK_{45}	—	August 7, 2004	Palomar	NEAT	·	4.6 km	MPC · JPL
288650	2004 PV_{46}	—	August 8, 2004	Campo Imperatore	CINEOS	NYS	790 m	MPC · JPL
288651	2004 PG_{47}	—	August 8, 2004	Palomar	NEAT	·	1.2 km	MPC · JPL
288652	2004 PN_{50}	—	August 8, 2004	Socorro	LINEAR	·	1.0 km	MPC · JPL
288653	2004 PH_{51}	—	August 8, 2004	Socorro	LINEAR	·	900 m	MPC · JPL
288654	2004 PR_{52}	—	August 8, 2004	Socorro	LINEAR	·	2.9 km	MPC · JPL
288655	2004 PV_{53}	—	August 8, 2004	Socorro	LINEAR	·	1.2 km	MPC · JPL
288656	2004 PR_{54}	—	August 8, 2004	Anderson Mesa	LONEOS	V	850 m	MPC · JPL
288657	2004 PT_{54}	—	August 8, 2004	Anderson Mesa	LONEOS	·	870 m	MPC · JPL
288658	2004 PE_{56}	—	August 9, 2004	Campo Imperatore	CINEOS	·	800 m	MPC · JPL
288659	2004 PL_{56}	—	August 9, 2004	Anderson Mesa	LONEOS	·	850 m	MPC · JPL
288660	2004 PS_{57}	—	August 9, 2004	Socorro	LINEAR	V	880 m	MPC · JPL
288661	2004 PX_{57}	—	August 9, 2004	Socorro	LINEAR	·	1.8 km	MPC · JPL
288662	2004 PA_{59}	—	August 9, 2004	Socorro	LINEAR	·	3.8 km	MPC · JPL
288663	2004 PB_{61}	—	August 9, 2004	Socorro	LINEAR	·	2.1 km	MPC · JPL
288664	2004 PH_{61}	—	August 9, 2004	Socorro	LINEAR	BRA	1.8 km	MPC · JPL
288665	2004 PJ_{62}	—	August 10, 2004	Campo Imperatore	CINEOS	·	780 m	MPC · JPL
288666	2004 PN_{65}	—	August 10, 2004	Socorro	LINEAR	·	5.1 km	MPC · JPL
288667	2004 PW_{65}	—	August 10, 2004	Anderson Mesa	LONEOS	V	660 m	MPC · JPL
288668	2004 PK_{67}	—	August 5, 2004	Palomar	NEAT	·	910 m	MPC · JPL
288669	2004 PL_{68}	—	August 6, 2004	Palomar	NEAT	·	1.2 km	MPC · JPL
288670	2004 PF_{69}	—	August 7, 2004	Palomar	NEAT	·	2.1 km	MPC · JPL
288671	2004 PQ_{70}	—	August 8, 2004	Palomar	NEAT	·	2.0 km	MPC · JPL
288672	2004 PW_{72}	—	August 8, 2004	Palomar	NEAT	·	1.1 km	MPC · JPL
288673	2004 PM_{74}	—	August 8, 2004	Socorro	LINEAR	THM	2.4 km	MPC · JPL
288674	2004 PC_{76}	—	August 9, 2004	Socorro	LINEAR	·	830 m	MPC · JPL
288675	2004 PD_{76}	—	August 9, 2004	Socorro	LINEAR	·	1.3 km	MPC · JPL
288676	2004 PJ_{76}	—	August 9, 2004	Anderson Mesa	LONEOS	·	670 m	MPC · JPL
288677	2004 PW_{82}	—	August 10, 2004	Socorro	LINEAR	EOS	2.2 km	MPC · JPL
288678	2004 PU_{83}	—	August 10, 2004	Socorro	LINEAR	GEF	1.9 km	MPC · JPL
288679	2004 PU_{86}	—	August 11, 2004	Socorro	LINEAR	V	730 m	MPC · JPL
288680	2004 PA_{92}	—	August 12, 2004	Socorro	LINEAR	·	1.7 km	MPC · JPL
288681	2004 PN_{93}	—	August 9, 2004	Socorro	LINEAR	slow	3.3 km	MPC · JPL
288682	2004 PX_{95}	—	August 8, 2004	Anderson Mesa	LONEOS	·	1.0 km	MPC · JPL
288683	2004 PG_{96}	—	August 11, 2004	Socorro	LINEAR	·	770 m	MPC · JPL
288684	2004 PC_{98}	—	August 14, 2004	Reedy Creek	J. Broughton	·	3.5 km	MPC · JPL
288685	2004 PO_{98}	—	August 8, 2004	Socorro	LINEAR	·	1.2 km	MPC · JPL
288686	2004 PL_{99}	—	August 10, 2004	Socorro	LINEAR	·	2.8 km	MPC · JPL
288687	2004 PF_{102}	—	August 12, 2004	Socorro	LINEAR	·	3.5 km	MPC · JPL
288688	2004 PY_{103}	—	August 12, 2004	Socorro	LINEAR	THB	3.9 km	MPC · JPL
288689	2004 PD_{107}	—	August 15, 2004	Palomar	NEAT	LIX	5.6 km	MPC · JPL
288690	2004 PC_{114}	—	August 12, 2004	Socorro	LINEAR	(18466)	3.7 km	MPC · JPL
288691	2004 QE	—	August 16, 2004	Wrightwood	J. W. Young	·	770 m	MPC · JPL
288692	2004 QJ_{1}	—	August 19, 2004	Pla D'Arguines	R. Ferrando	H	640 m	MPC · JPL
288693	2004 QT_{1}	—	August 19, 2004	Socorro	LINEAR	·	3.0 km	MPC · JPL
288694	2004 QH_{9}	—	August 20, 2004	Siding Spring	SSS	·	2.9 km	MPC · JPL
288695	2004 QC_{12}	—	August 21, 2004	Siding Spring	SSS	·	3.5 km	MPC · JPL
288696	2004 QZ_{16}	—	August 23, 2004	Goodricke-Pigott	Goodricke-Pigott	·	940 m	MPC · JPL
288697	2004 QO_{17}	—	August 25, 2004	Socorro	LINEAR	PHO	880 m	MPC · JPL
288698	2004 QS_{19}	—	August 11, 2004	Socorro	LINEAR	·	770 m	MPC · JPL
288699	2004 QY_{19}	—	August 22, 2004	Goodricke-Pigott	Goodricke-Pigott	·	1.0 km	MPC · JPL
288700	2004 QQ_{20}	—	August 20, 2004	Kitt Peak	Spacewatch	·	1.9 km	MPC · JPL

== 288701–288800 ==
back to top

Designation			Discovery			Properties		Ref
Permanent	Provisional	Named after	Date	Site	Discoverer(s)	Category	Diam.	Ref
288701	2004 QM_{25}	—	August 26, 2004	Socorro	LINEAR	TIN	3.5 km	MPC · JPL
288702	2004 QH_{27}	—	August 20, 2004	Catalina	CSS	TIR	3.6 km	MPC · JPL
288703	2004 RE	—	September 2, 2004	Wrightwood	J. W. Young	·	830 m	MPC · JPL
288704	2004 RT_{3}	—	September 4, 2004	Palomar	NEAT	·	2.6 km	MPC · JPL
288705	2004 RB_{5}	—	September 4, 2004	Palomar	NEAT	·	4.0 km	MPC · JPL
288706	2004 RX_{5}	—	September 4, 2004	Palomar	NEAT	·	1.4 km	MPC · JPL
288707	2004 RN_{6}	—	September 5, 2004	Palomar	NEAT	·	3.6 km	MPC · JPL
288708	2004 RB_{7}	—	September 5, 2004	Palomar	NEAT	·	2.8 km	MPC · JPL
288709	2004 RD_{7}	—	September 5, 2004	Palomar	NEAT	·	3.5 km	MPC · JPL
288710	2004 RN_{7}	—	September 6, 2004	Palomar	NEAT	·	3.1 km	MPC · JPL
288711	2004 RG_{12}	—	September 8, 2004	St. Véran	St. Veran	·	1.2 km	MPC · JPL
288712	2004 RC_{17}	—	September 7, 2004	Kitt Peak	Spacewatch	·	1.3 km	MPC · JPL
288713	2004 RS_{17}	—	September 7, 2004	Socorro	LINEAR	·	3.2 km	MPC · JPL
288714	2004 RC_{18}	—	September 7, 2004	Socorro	LINEAR	·	1.0 km	MPC · JPL
288715	2004 RF_{18}	—	September 7, 2004	Socorro	LINEAR	·	1.2 km	MPC · JPL
288716	2004 RG_{18}	—	September 7, 2004	Socorro	LINEAR	·	1.4 km	MPC · JPL
288717	2004 RK_{23}	—	September 7, 2004	Kitt Peak	Spacewatch	NYS	1.1 km	MPC · JPL
288718	2004 RO_{23}	—	September 7, 2004	Kitt Peak	Spacewatch	·	1.4 km	MPC · JPL
288719	2004 RR_{27}	—	September 6, 2004	Siding Spring	SSS	·	1.8 km	MPC · JPL
288720	2004 RW_{30}	—	September 7, 2004	Socorro	LINEAR	·	880 m	MPC · JPL
288721	2004 RB_{33}	—	September 7, 2004	Socorro	LINEAR	DOR	3.2 km	MPC · JPL
288722	2004 RC_{38}	—	September 7, 2004	Socorro	LINEAR	·	1.4 km	MPC · JPL
288723	2004 RM_{38}	—	September 7, 2004	Socorro	LINEAR	·	1.6 km	MPC · JPL
288724	2004 RN_{42}	—	September 8, 2004	Campo Imperatore	CINEOS	·	3.6 km	MPC · JPL
288725	2004 RU_{43}	—	September 8, 2004	Socorro	LINEAR	·	2.6 km	MPC · JPL
288726	2004 RG_{44}	—	September 8, 2004	Socorro	LINEAR	·	1.8 km	MPC · JPL
288727	2004 RT_{44}	—	September 8, 2004	Socorro	LINEAR	·	3.3 km	MPC · JPL
288728	2004 RZ_{44}	—	September 8, 2004	Socorro	LINEAR	·	730 m	MPC · JPL
288729	2004 RA_{45}	—	September 8, 2004	Socorro	LINEAR	EOS	2.5 km	MPC · JPL
288730	2004 RC_{45}	—	September 8, 2004	Socorro	LINEAR	MAS	840 m	MPC · JPL
288731	2004 RV_{45}	—	September 8, 2004	Socorro	LINEAR	VER	4.1 km	MPC · JPL
288732	2004 RW_{45}	—	September 8, 2004	Socorro	LINEAR	KOR	1.7 km	MPC · JPL
288733	2004 RD_{46}	—	September 8, 2004	Socorro	LINEAR	·	2.5 km	MPC · JPL
288734	2004 RC_{47}	—	September 8, 2004	Socorro	LINEAR	·	3.8 km	MPC · JPL
288735	2004 RE_{47}	—	September 8, 2004	Socorro	LINEAR	·	1.0 km	MPC · JPL
288736	2004 RK_{48}	—	September 8, 2004	Socorro	LINEAR	·	2.8 km	MPC · JPL
288737	2004 RV_{51}	—	September 8, 2004	Socorro	LINEAR	·	910 m	MPC · JPL
288738	2004 RY_{52}	—	September 8, 2004	Socorro	LINEAR	·	890 m	MPC · JPL
288739	2004 RM_{55}	—	September 8, 2004	Socorro	LINEAR	EOS	2.1 km	MPC · JPL
288740	2004 RR_{55}	—	September 8, 2004	Socorro	LINEAR	MAR	1.4 km	MPC · JPL
288741	2004 RA_{56}	—	September 8, 2004	Socorro	LINEAR	·	3.7 km	MPC · JPL
288742	2004 RX_{57}	—	September 8, 2004	Socorro	LINEAR	·	1.2 km	MPC · JPL
288743	2004 RO_{58}	—	September 8, 2004	Socorro	LINEAR	·	1.2 km	MPC · JPL
288744	2004 RH_{60}	—	September 8, 2004	Socorro	LINEAR	·	1.2 km	MPC · JPL
288745	2004 RE_{62}	—	September 8, 2004	Socorro	LINEAR	·	1.1 km	MPC · JPL
288746	2004 RL_{64}	—	September 8, 2004	Socorro	LINEAR	·	1.0 km	MPC · JPL
288747	2004 RN_{64}	—	September 8, 2004	Socorro	LINEAR	·	930 m	MPC · JPL
288748	2004 RT_{64}	—	September 8, 2004	Socorro	LINEAR	·	860 m	MPC · JPL
288749	2004 RM_{65}	—	September 8, 2004	Socorro	LINEAR	NYS	1.1 km	MPC · JPL
288750	2004 RD_{66}	—	September 8, 2004	Socorro	LINEAR	V	860 m	MPC · JPL
288751	2004 RM_{67}	—	September 8, 2004	Socorro	LINEAR	·	2.3 km	MPC · JPL
288752	2004 RQ_{67}	—	September 8, 2004	Socorro	LINEAR	V	870 m	MPC · JPL
288753	2004 RB_{70}	—	September 8, 2004	Socorro	LINEAR	·	3.0 km	MPC · JPL
288754	2004 RV_{73}	—	September 8, 2004	Socorro	LINEAR	·	1.5 km	MPC · JPL
288755	2004 RX_{73}	—	September 8, 2004	Socorro	LINEAR	·	970 m	MPC · JPL
288756	2004 RZ_{74}	—	September 8, 2004	Socorro	LINEAR	·	1.1 km	MPC · JPL
288757	2004 RG_{80}	—	September 7, 2004	Socorro	LINEAR	·	1.2 km	MPC · JPL
288758	2004 RS_{80}	—	September 8, 2004	Socorro	LINEAR	·	2.0 km	MPC · JPL
288759	2004 RD_{81}	—	September 8, 2004	Socorro	LINEAR	CYB	5.7 km	MPC · JPL
288760	2004 RQ_{81}	—	September 8, 2004	Socorro	LINEAR	EOS	2.6 km	MPC · JPL
288761	2004 RD_{83}	—	September 9, 2004	Socorro	LINEAR	MAS	860 m	MPC · JPL
288762	2004 RM_{89}	—	September 8, 2004	Socorro	LINEAR	·	850 m	MPC · JPL
288763	2004 RC_{92}	—	September 8, 2004	Socorro	LINEAR	EOS	2.4 km	MPC · JPL
288764	2004 RF_{92}	—	September 8, 2004	Socorro	LINEAR	·	2.7 km	MPC · JPL
288765	2004 RK_{93}	—	September 8, 2004	Socorro	LINEAR	·	880 m	MPC · JPL
288766	2004 RB_{94}	—	September 8, 2004	Socorro	LINEAR	·	2.2 km	MPC · JPL
288767	2004 RY_{94}	—	September 8, 2004	Socorro	LINEAR	·	1.4 km	MPC · JPL
288768	2004 RD_{95}	—	September 8, 2004	Socorro	LINEAR	·	1.2 km	MPC · JPL
288769	2004 RU_{95}	—	September 8, 2004	Socorro	LINEAR	·	4.2 km	MPC · JPL
288770	2004 RN_{96}	—	September 8, 2004	Socorro	LINEAR	·	840 m	MPC · JPL
288771	2004 RT_{96}	—	September 8, 2004	Palomar	NEAT	·	2.0 km	MPC · JPL
288772	2004 RD_{98}	—	September 8, 2004	Socorro	LINEAR	·	1.5 km	MPC · JPL
288773	2004 RN_{98}	—	September 8, 2004	Socorro	LINEAR	·	2.9 km	MPC · JPL
288774	2004 RJ_{99}	—	September 8, 2004	Socorro	LINEAR	HYG	3.2 km	MPC · JPL
288775	2004 RR_{99}	—	September 8, 2004	Socorro	LINEAR	·	4.3 km	MPC · JPL
288776	2004 RZ_{99}	—	September 8, 2004	Socorro	LINEAR	·	3.4 km	MPC · JPL
288777	2004 RM_{100}	—	September 8, 2004	Socorro	LINEAR	·	3.8 km	MPC · JPL
288778	2004 RO_{101}	—	September 8, 2004	Socorro	LINEAR	·	3.0 km	MPC · JPL
288779	2004 RN_{102}	—	September 8, 2004	Socorro	LINEAR	·	1.1 km	MPC · JPL
288780	2004 RW_{102}	—	September 8, 2004	Socorro	LINEAR	·	3.6 km	MPC · JPL
288781	2004 RP_{107}	—	September 9, 2004	Socorro	LINEAR	·	1.5 km	MPC · JPL
288782	2004 RF_{108}	—	September 9, 2004	Kitt Peak	Spacewatch	EOS	2.5 km	MPC · JPL
288783	2004 RL_{108}	—	September 9, 2004	Kitt Peak	Spacewatch	·	740 m	MPC · JPL
288784	2004 RA_{122}	—	September 7, 2004	Kitt Peak	Spacewatch	MAS	740 m	MPC · JPL
288785	2004 RH_{123}	—	September 7, 2004	Kitt Peak	Spacewatch	·	2.6 km	MPC · JPL
288786	2004 RX_{123}	—	September 7, 2004	Palomar	NEAT	PHO	1.4 km	MPC · JPL
288787	2004 RF_{124}	—	September 7, 2004	Socorro	LINEAR	·	3.8 km	MPC · JPL
288788	2004 RH_{128}	—	September 7, 2004	Kitt Peak	Spacewatch	MRX	1.3 km	MPC · JPL
288789	2004 RF_{138}	—	September 8, 2004	Palomar	NEAT	·	5.4 km	MPC · JPL
288790	2004 RQ_{140}	—	September 8, 2004	Socorro	LINEAR	·	730 m	MPC · JPL
288791	2004 RM_{141}	—	September 8, 2004	Socorro	LINEAR	·	5.4 km	MPC · JPL
288792	2004 RJ_{142}	—	September 8, 2004	Socorro	LINEAR	·	2.1 km	MPC · JPL
288793	2004 RB_{143}	—	September 8, 2004	Palomar	NEAT	·	3.7 km	MPC · JPL
288794	2004 RS_{143}	—	September 8, 2004	Socorro	LINEAR	·	1.4 km	MPC · JPL
288795	2004 RC_{149}	—	September 9, 2004	Socorro	LINEAR	·	1.3 km	MPC · JPL
288796	2004 RF_{150}	—	September 9, 2004	Socorro	LINEAR	·	1.5 km	MPC · JPL
288797	2004 RG_{151}	—	September 9, 2004	Socorro	LINEAR	·	3.8 km	MPC · JPL
288798	2004 RQ_{152}	—	September 10, 2004	Socorro	LINEAR	·	2.7 km	MPC · JPL
288799	2004 RA_{154}	—	September 10, 2004	Socorro	LINEAR	·	1.2 km	MPC · JPL
288800	2004 RK_{155}	—	September 10, 2004	Socorro	LINEAR	·	1.1 km	MPC · JPL

== 288801–288900 ==
back to top

Designation			Discovery			Properties		Ref
Permanent	Provisional	Named after	Date	Site	Discoverer(s)	Category	Diam.	Ref
288801	2004 RD_{156}	—	September 10, 2004	Socorro	LINEAR	·	2.9 km	MPC · JPL
288802	2004 RF_{157}	—	September 10, 2004	Socorro	LINEAR	·	940 m	MPC · JPL
288803	2004 RY_{157}	—	September 10, 2004	Socorro	LINEAR	·	3.7 km	MPC · JPL
288804	2004 RO_{158}	—	September 10, 2004	Socorro	LINEAR	·	1.3 km	MPC · JPL
288805	2004 RV_{158}	—	September 10, 2004	Socorro	LINEAR	·	850 m	MPC · JPL
288806	2004 RB_{163}	—	September 11, 2004	Kitt Peak	Spacewatch	·	1.2 km	MPC · JPL
288807	2004 RW_{164}	—	September 13, 2004	Kitt Peak	Spacewatch	APO	740 m	MPC · JPL
288808	2004 RV_{167}	—	September 7, 2004	Socorro	LINEAR	LUT	6.2 km	MPC · JPL
288809	2004 RA_{169}	—	September 8, 2004	Socorro	LINEAR	V	560 m	MPC · JPL
288810	2004 RF_{169}	—	September 8, 2004	Palomar	NEAT	BRA	1.9 km	MPC · JPL
288811	2004 RP_{170}	—	September 8, 2004	Palomar	NEAT	NYS	2.1 km	MPC · JPL
288812	2004 RH_{172}	—	September 9, 2004	Socorro	LINEAR	·	1.5 km	MPC · JPL
288813	2004 RO_{172}	—	September 9, 2004	Kitt Peak	Spacewatch	·	1.7 km	MPC · JPL
288814	2004 RS_{174}	—	September 10, 2004	Socorro	LINEAR	·	4.3 km	MPC · JPL
288815	2004 RM_{176}	—	August 12, 2004	Palomar	NEAT	TIR	3.2 km	MPC · JPL
288816	2004 RT_{177}	—	September 10, 2004	Socorro	LINEAR	·	1.0 km	MPC · JPL
288817	2004 RX_{177}	—	September 10, 2004	Socorro	LINEAR	·	3.1 km	MPC · JPL
288818	2004 RB_{178}	—	September 10, 2004	Socorro	LINEAR	·	4.8 km	MPC · JPL
288819	2004 RU_{179}	—	September 10, 2004	Socorro	LINEAR	·	1.2 km	MPC · JPL
288820	2004 RZ_{179}	—	September 10, 2004	Socorro	LINEAR	EOS	2.6 km	MPC · JPL
288821	2004 RF_{182}	—	September 10, 2004	Socorro	LINEAR	·	1.1 km	MPC · JPL
288822	2004 RS_{183}	—	September 10, 2004	Socorro	LINEAR	·	880 m	MPC · JPL
288823	2004 RW_{183}	—	September 10, 2004	Socorro	LINEAR	·	1.3 km	MPC · JPL
288824	2004 RX_{184}	—	September 10, 2004	Socorro	LINEAR	EOS	2.9 km	MPC · JPL
288825	2004 RN_{185}	—	September 10, 2004	Socorro	LINEAR	HYG	3.3 km	MPC · JPL
288826	2004 RO_{185}	—	September 10, 2004	Socorro	LINEAR	·	970 m	MPC · JPL
288827	2004 RO_{187}	—	September 10, 2004	Socorro	LINEAR	V	980 m	MPC · JPL
288828	2004 RQ_{187}	—	September 10, 2004	Socorro	LINEAR	V	790 m	MPC · JPL
288829	2004 RD_{188}	—	September 10, 2004	Socorro	LINEAR	·	3.2 km	MPC · JPL
288830	2004 RA_{190}	—	September 10, 2004	Socorro	LINEAR	·	890 m	MPC · JPL
288831	2004 RG_{190}	—	September 10, 2004	Socorro	LINEAR	V	860 m	MPC · JPL
288832	2004 RM_{190}	—	September 10, 2004	Socorro	LINEAR	EOS	3.0 km	MPC · JPL
288833	2004 RN_{190}	—	September 10, 2004	Socorro	LINEAR	V	940 m	MPC · JPL
288834	2004 RX_{190}	—	September 10, 2004	Socorro	LINEAR	·	3.5 km	MPC · JPL
288835	2004 RX_{192}	—	September 10, 2004	Socorro	LINEAR	·	1.2 km	MPC · JPL
288836	2004 RV_{193}	—	September 10, 2004	Socorro	LINEAR	·	1.0 km	MPC · JPL
288837	2004 RC_{195}	—	September 10, 2004	Socorro	LINEAR	·	1.0 km	MPC · JPL
288838	2004 RL_{197}	—	September 10, 2004	Socorro	LINEAR	V	920 m	MPC · JPL
288839	2004 RR_{197}	—	September 10, 2004	Socorro	LINEAR	·	2.9 km	MPC · JPL
288840	2004 RO_{198}	—	September 10, 2004	Socorro	LINEAR	·	4.0 km	MPC · JPL
288841	2004 RY_{201}	—	September 11, 2004	Socorro	LINEAR	·	3.2 km	MPC · JPL
288842	2004 RO_{202}	—	September 11, 2004	Socorro	LINEAR	EOS	2.7 km	MPC · JPL
288843	2004 RX_{202}	—	September 11, 2004	Kitt Peak	Spacewatch	·	1.3 km	MPC · JPL
288844	2004 RX_{203}	—	September 12, 2004	Socorro	LINEAR	·	3.6 km	MPC · JPL
288845	2004 RH_{204}	—	September 12, 2004	Socorro	LINEAR	·	2.9 km	MPC · JPL
288846	2004 RQ_{204}	—	September 12, 2004	Kitt Peak	Spacewatch	·	3.9 km	MPC · JPL
288847	2004 RT_{204}	—	September 12, 2004	Kitt Peak	Spacewatch	·	5.4 km	MPC · JPL
288848	2004 RW_{204}	—	August 15, 2004	Campo Imperatore	CINEOS	·	940 m	MPC · JPL
288849	2004 RN_{205}	—	September 8, 2004	Socorro	LINEAR	·	1.1 km	MPC · JPL
288850	2004 RU_{205}	—	September 10, 2004	Socorro	LINEAR	LIX	5.6 km	MPC · JPL
288851	2004 RW_{205}	—	September 10, 2004	Socorro	LINEAR	·	940 m	MPC · JPL
288852	2004 RJ_{207}	—	September 11, 2004	Socorro	LINEAR	·	3.9 km	MPC · JPL
288853	2004 RC_{208}	—	September 11, 2004	Socorro	LINEAR	·	5.2 km	MPC · JPL
288854	2004 RS_{208}	—	September 11, 2004	Socorro	LINEAR	·	1.3 km	MPC · JPL
288855	2004 RZ_{212}	—	September 11, 2004	Socorro	LINEAR	·	1.7 km	MPC · JPL
288856	2004 RT_{213}	—	September 11, 2004	Socorro	LINEAR	ARM	5.1 km	MPC · JPL
288857	2004 RG_{214}	—	September 11, 2004	Socorro	LINEAR	·	4.8 km	MPC · JPL
288858	2004 RO_{217}	—	September 11, 2004	Socorro	LINEAR	·	5.2 km	MPC · JPL
288859	2004 RY_{219}	—	September 11, 2004	Socorro	LINEAR	THB	4.3 km	MPC · JPL
288860	2004 RQ_{222}	—	September 14, 2004	Socorro	LINEAR	·	3.5 km	MPC · JPL
288861	2004 RS_{224}	—	September 9, 2004	Socorro	LINEAR	·	2.0 km	MPC · JPL
288862	2004 RK_{225}	—	September 9, 2004	Socorro	LINEAR	·	1.2 km	MPC · JPL
288863	2004 RQ_{225}	—	September 9, 2004	Socorro	LINEAR	·	2.3 km	MPC · JPL
288864	2004 RS_{226}	—	September 9, 2004	Socorro	LINEAR	·	1.2 km	MPC · JPL
288865	2004 RW_{227}	—	September 9, 2004	Kitt Peak	Spacewatch	EOS	2.6 km	MPC · JPL
288866	2004 RA_{228}	—	September 9, 2004	Kitt Peak	Spacewatch	·	4.4 km	MPC · JPL
288867	2004 RU_{229}	—	September 9, 2004	Kitt Peak	Spacewatch	·	1.3 km	MPC · JPL
288868	2004 RD_{231}	—	September 9, 2004	Kitt Peak	Spacewatch	MRX	1.3 km	MPC · JPL
288869	2004 RN_{231}	—	September 9, 2004	Kitt Peak	Spacewatch	·	2.9 km	MPC · JPL
288870	2004 RV_{231}	—	September 9, 2004	Kitt Peak	Spacewatch	EOS	2.6 km	MPC · JPL
288871	2004 RR_{232}	—	September 9, 2004	Kitt Peak	Spacewatch	·	1.7 km	MPC · JPL
288872	2004 RR_{233}	—	September 9, 2004	Kitt Peak	Spacewatch	THM	2.5 km	MPC · JPL
288873	2004 RY_{233}	—	September 9, 2004	Kitt Peak	Spacewatch	·	1.1 km	MPC · JPL
288874	2004 RJ_{235}	—	September 10, 2004	Socorro	LINEAR	·	2.7 km	MPC · JPL
288875	2004 RH_{236}	—	September 10, 2004	Socorro	LINEAR	·	4.5 km	MPC · JPL
288876	2004 RS_{238}	—	September 10, 2004	Kitt Peak	Spacewatch	·	2.1 km	MPC · JPL
288877	2004 RM_{239}	—	September 10, 2004	Kitt Peak	Spacewatch	(5)	1.3 km	MPC · JPL
288878	2004 RE_{241}	—	September 10, 2004	Kitt Peak	Spacewatch	·	1.4 km	MPC · JPL
288879	2004 RN_{241}	—	September 10, 2004	Kitt Peak	Spacewatch	KOR	1.6 km	MPC · JPL
288880	2004 RH_{242}	—	September 10, 2004	Kitt Peak	Spacewatch	·	2.2 km	MPC · JPL
288881	2004 RM_{243}	—	September 10, 2004	Kitt Peak	Spacewatch	·	1.4 km	MPC · JPL
288882	2004 RL_{245}	—	September 10, 2004	Kitt Peak	Spacewatch	·	2.3 km	MPC · JPL
288883	2004 RR_{245}	—	September 10, 2004	Kitt Peak	Spacewatch	·	2.0 km	MPC · JPL
288884	2004 RU_{246}	—	September 11, 2004	Socorro	LINEAR	LIX	4.4 km	MPC · JPL
288885	2004 RW_{247}	—	September 12, 2004	Socorro	LINEAR	·	6.9 km	MPC · JPL
288886	2004 RV_{250}	—	September 13, 2004	Palomar	NEAT	·	980 m	MPC · JPL
288887	2004 RZ_{254}	—	September 6, 2004	Palomar	NEAT	MAR	1.4 km	MPC · JPL
288888	2004 RZ_{255}	—	September 6, 2004	Siding Spring	SSS	·	4.5 km	MPC · JPL
288889	2004 RR_{266}	—	September 11, 2004	Kitt Peak	Spacewatch	·	2.3 km	MPC · JPL
288890	2004 RR_{274}	—	September 11, 2004	Socorro	LINEAR	·	3.9 km	MPC · JPL
288891	2004 RW_{276}	—	September 13, 2004	Kitt Peak	Spacewatch	·	1.7 km	MPC · JPL
288892	2004 RU_{287}	—	September 15, 2004	7300	W. K. Y. Yeung	·	1.1 km	MPC · JPL
288893	2004 RJ_{290}	—	September 8, 2004	Socorro	LINEAR	MRX	1.5 km	MPC · JPL
288894	2004 RM_{291}	—	September 10, 2004	Socorro	LINEAR	BRA	1.7 km	MPC · JPL
288895	2004 RJ_{296}	—	September 11, 2004	Kitt Peak	Spacewatch	·	4.5 km	MPC · JPL
288896	2004 RQ_{304}	—	September 12, 2004	Kitt Peak	Spacewatch	·	1.2 km	MPC · JPL
288897	2004 RJ_{306}	—	September 12, 2004	Socorro	LINEAR	·	1.6 km	MPC · JPL
288898	2004 RL_{306}	—	September 12, 2004	Socorro	LINEAR	H	890 m	MPC · JPL
288899	2004 RR_{308}	—	September 13, 2004	Socorro	LINEAR	·	1.4 km	MPC · JPL
288900	2004 RW_{309}	—	September 13, 2004	Kitt Peak	Spacewatch	HYG	3.0 km	MPC · JPL

== 288901–289000 ==
back to top

Designation			Discovery			Properties		Ref
Permanent	Provisional	Named after	Date	Site	Discoverer(s)	Category	Diam.	Ref
288901	2004 RC_{311}	—	September 13, 2004	Palomar	NEAT	·	920 m	MPC · JPL
288902	2004 RR_{320}	—	September 13, 2004	Socorro	LINEAR	·	1.4 km	MPC · JPL
288903	2004 RW_{320}	—	September 13, 2004	Socorro	LINEAR	·	3.0 km	MPC · JPL
288904	2004 RP_{321}	—	September 13, 2004	Socorro	LINEAR	·	1.6 km	MPC · JPL
288905	2004 RS_{323}	—	September 13, 2004	Socorro	LINEAR	V	890 m	MPC · JPL
288906	2004 RJ_{327}	—	September 13, 2004	Palomar	NEAT	·	1.7 km	MPC · JPL
288907	2004 RX_{329}	—	September 14, 2004	Palomar	NEAT	PHO	1.1 km	MPC · JPL
288908	2004 RC_{331}	—	September 15, 2004	Kitt Peak	Spacewatch	·	2.3 km	MPC · JPL
288909	2004 RK_{345}	—	September 10, 2004	Socorro	LINEAR	MRX	1.3 km	MPC · JPL
288910	2004 RB_{346}	—	September 11, 2004	Palomar	NEAT	·	1.2 km	MPC · JPL
288911	2004 RK_{346}	—	September 8, 2004	Socorro	LINEAR	·	3.2 km	MPC · JPL
288912	2004 RB_{356}	—	September 7, 2004	Kitt Peak	Spacewatch	EOS	1.9 km	MPC · JPL
288913	2004 ST	—	September 17, 2004	Ottmarsheim	Ottmarsheim	·	2.1 km	MPC · JPL
288914	2004 SX	—	September 17, 2004	Socorro	LINEAR	AMO	530 m	MPC · JPL
288915	2004 SL_{3}	—	September 17, 2004	Kitt Peak	Spacewatch	·	1.5 km	MPC · JPL
288916	2004 SK_{6}	—	September 17, 2004	Kitt Peak	Spacewatch	·	1.2 km	MPC · JPL
288917	2004 SY_{8}	—	September 18, 2004	Socorro	LINEAR	HYG	3.5 km	MPC · JPL
288918	2004 SV_{9}	—	September 16, 2004	Kitt Peak	Spacewatch	·	2.1 km	MPC · JPL
288919	2004 SS_{10}	—	September 16, 2004	Siding Spring	SSS	615	2.0 km	MPC · JPL
288920	2004 SG_{14}	—	September 17, 2004	Anderson Mesa	LONEOS	·	1.2 km	MPC · JPL
288921	2004 SQ_{14}	—	September 17, 2004	Anderson Mesa	LONEOS	·	3.7 km	MPC · JPL
288922	2004 SE_{16}	—	September 17, 2004	Anderson Mesa	LONEOS	ERI	1.7 km	MPC · JPL
288923	2004 SK_{17}	—	September 17, 2004	Anderson Mesa	LONEOS	·	1.4 km	MPC · JPL
288924	2004 SR_{18}	—	September 18, 2004	Socorro	LINEAR	·	2.7 km	MPC · JPL
288925	2004 SS_{23}	—	September 17, 2004	Kitt Peak	Spacewatch	V	790 m	MPC · JPL
288926	2004 SK_{25}	—	September 21, 2004	Kitt Peak	Spacewatch	·	3.3 km	MPC · JPL
288927	2004 SC_{29}	—	September 17, 2004	Socorro	LINEAR	·	2.1 km	MPC · JPL
288928	2004 SN_{29}	—	September 17, 2004	Socorro	LINEAR	EOS	2.8 km	MPC · JPL
288929	2004 SG_{31}	—	September 17, 2004	Socorro	LINEAR	·	3.1 km	MPC · JPL
288930	2004 SR_{31}	—	September 17, 2004	Socorro	LINEAR	V	970 m	MPC · JPL
288931	2004 SH_{32}	—	September 17, 2004	Socorro	LINEAR	·	840 m	MPC · JPL
288932	2004 SJ_{33}	—	September 17, 2004	Socorro	LINEAR	·	5.4 km	MPC · JPL
288933	2004 SR_{35}	—	September 17, 2004	Socorro	LINEAR	·	4.8 km	MPC · JPL
288934	2004 SW_{35}	—	September 17, 2004	Kitt Peak	Spacewatch	·	2.9 km	MPC · JPL
288935	2004 SZ_{36}	—	September 17, 2004	Kitt Peak	Spacewatch	·	2.5 km	MPC · JPL
288936	2004 SF_{39}	—	September 17, 2004	Socorro	LINEAR	·	920 m	MPC · JPL
288937	2004 SL_{42}	—	September 18, 2004	Socorro	LINEAR	·	890 m	MPC · JPL
288938	2004 SQ_{42}	—	September 18, 2004	Socorro	LINEAR	·	1.2 km	MPC · JPL
288939	2004 SW_{42}	—	September 18, 2004	Socorro	LINEAR	·	770 m	MPC · JPL
288940	2004 SH_{43}	—	September 18, 2004	Socorro	LINEAR	·	2.0 km	MPC · JPL
288941	2004 SP_{43}	—	September 18, 2004	Socorro	LINEAR	·	3.7 km	MPC · JPL
288942	2004 SK_{46}	—	September 18, 2004	Socorro	LINEAR	EMA	4.3 km	MPC · JPL
288943	2004 SZ_{49}	—	September 22, 2004	Socorro	LINEAR	·	1.1 km	MPC · JPL
288944	2004 SL_{51}	—	September 17, 2004	Socorro	LINEAR	·	1.5 km	MPC · JPL
288945	2004 SS_{51}	—	September 17, 2004	Socorro	LINEAR	NYS	1.1 km	MPC · JPL
288946	2004 SB_{52}	—	September 17, 2004	Socorro	LINEAR	·	2.2 km	MPC · JPL
288947	2004 SK_{52}	—	September 18, 2004	Socorro	LINEAR	·	1.3 km	MPC · JPL
288948	2004 SF_{53}	—	September 22, 2004	Socorro	LINEAR	·	3.6 km	MPC · JPL
288949	2004 SN_{53}	—	September 22, 2004	Socorro	LINEAR	·	1.0 km	MPC · JPL
288950	2004 SA_{56}	—	September 23, 2004	Goodricke-Pigott	R. A. Tucker	NYS	1.1 km	MPC · JPL
288951	2004 SV_{60}	—	September 17, 2004	Anderson Mesa	LONEOS	EOS	3.0 km	MPC · JPL
288952	2004 SL_{61}	—	September 17, 2004	Anderson Mesa	LONEOS	V	1.0 km	MPC · JPL
288953	2004 TR_{2}	—	October 4, 2004	Kitt Peak	Spacewatch	NYS	1.1 km	MPC · JPL
288954	2004 TT_{3}	—	October 4, 2004	Kitt Peak	Spacewatch	·	2.9 km	MPC · JPL
288955	2004 TO_{6}	—	October 2, 2004	Palomar	NEAT	MAR	1.6 km	MPC · JPL
288956	2004 TV_{6}	—	October 3, 2004	Palomar	NEAT	·	2.0 km	MPC · JPL
288957	2004 TJ_{9}	—	October 7, 2004	Wrightwood	J. W. Young	·	1.2 km	MPC · JPL
288958	2004 TE_{12}	—	October 7, 2004	Socorro	LINEAR	·	2.3 km	MPC · JPL
288959 Biržai	2004 TJ_{16}	Biržai	October 11, 2004	Moletai	K. Černis, J. Zdanavičius	V	890 m	MPC · JPL
288960 Steponasdarius	2004 TN_{16}	Steponasdarius	October 11, 2004	Moletai	K. Černis, Zdanavicius, J.	EOS	2.6 km	MPC · JPL
288961 Stasysgirėnas	2004 TZ_{19}	Stasysgirėnas	October 12, 2004	Moletai	K. Černis, Zdanavicius, J.	·	3.4 km	MPC · JPL
288962	2004 TM_{23}	—	October 4, 2004	Kitt Peak	Spacewatch	V	750 m	MPC · JPL
288963	2004 TL_{26}	—	October 4, 2004	Kitt Peak	Spacewatch	·	2.4 km	MPC · JPL
288964	2004 TT_{27}	—	October 4, 2004	Kitt Peak	Spacewatch	·	2.0 km	MPC · JPL
288965	2004 TX_{27}	—	October 4, 2004	Kitt Peak	Spacewatch	·	4.5 km	MPC · JPL
288966	2004 TD_{28}	—	October 4, 2004	Kitt Peak	Spacewatch	MAS	810 m	MPC · JPL
288967	2004 TX_{28}	—	October 4, 2004	Kitt Peak	Spacewatch	·	3.3 km	MPC · JPL
288968	2004 TV_{29}	—	October 4, 2004	Kitt Peak	Spacewatch	·	1.0 km	MPC · JPL
288969	2004 TP_{34}	—	October 4, 2004	Kitt Peak	Spacewatch	·	3.3 km	MPC · JPL
288970	2004 TC_{38}	—	October 4, 2004	Kitt Peak	Spacewatch	·	820 m	MPC · JPL
288971	2004 TC_{40}	—	October 4, 2004	Kitt Peak	Spacewatch	·	1.2 km	MPC · JPL
288972	2004 TE_{41}	—	October 4, 2004	Anderson Mesa	LONEOS	·	1.8 km	MPC · JPL
288973	2004 TQ_{41}	—	October 4, 2004	Kitt Peak	Spacewatch	·	1.3 km	MPC · JPL
288974	2004 TR_{41}	—	October 4, 2004	Kitt Peak	Spacewatch	·	1.5 km	MPC · JPL
288975	2004 TK_{42}	—	October 4, 2004	Kitt Peak	Spacewatch	NYS	1.1 km	MPC · JPL
288976	2004 TO_{42}	—	October 4, 2004	Kitt Peak	Spacewatch	·	1.3 km	MPC · JPL
288977	2004 TM_{45}	—	October 4, 2004	Kitt Peak	Spacewatch	·	1.2 km	MPC · JPL
288978	2004 TW_{47}	—	October 4, 2004	Kitt Peak	Spacewatch	·	2.8 km	MPC · JPL
288979	2004 TY_{48}	—	October 4, 2004	Kitt Peak	Spacewatch	·	2.9 km	MPC · JPL
288980	2004 TG_{49}	—	October 4, 2004	Kitt Peak	Spacewatch	·	880 m	MPC · JPL
288981	2004 TH_{50}	—	October 4, 2004	Kitt Peak	Spacewatch	HYG	3.9 km	MPC · JPL
288982	2004 TN_{50}	—	October 4, 2004	Kitt Peak	Spacewatch	·	1.7 km	MPC · JPL
288983	2004 TN_{51}	—	October 4, 2004	Kitt Peak	Spacewatch	NYS	950 m	MPC · JPL
288984	2004 TZ_{52}	—	October 4, 2004	Kitt Peak	Spacewatch	NYS	1.4 km	MPC · JPL
288985	2004 TE_{54}	—	October 4, 2004	Kitt Peak	Spacewatch	·	1.5 km	MPC · JPL
288986	2004 TJ_{54}	—	October 4, 2004	Kitt Peak	Spacewatch	·	3.6 km	MPC · JPL
288987	2004 TQ_{55}	—	October 4, 2004	Kitt Peak	Spacewatch	·	830 m	MPC · JPL
288988	2004 TO_{58}	—	October 5, 2004	Kitt Peak	Spacewatch	·	3.2 km	MPC · JPL
288989	2004 TC_{60}	—	October 5, 2004	Anderson Mesa	LONEOS	ELF	4.8 km	MPC · JPL
288990	2004 TV_{60}	—	October 5, 2004	Anderson Mesa	LONEOS	NYS	880 m	MPC · JPL
288991	2004 TW_{60}	—	October 5, 2004	Anderson Mesa	LONEOS	·	4.4 km	MPC · JPL
288992	2004 TK_{61}	—	October 5, 2004	Anderson Mesa	LONEOS	NYS	1.3 km	MPC · JPL
288993	2004 TW_{61}	—	October 5, 2004	Anderson Mesa	LONEOS	·	3.0 km	MPC · JPL
288994	2004 TP_{63}	—	October 5, 2004	Kitt Peak	Spacewatch	·	3.2 km	MPC · JPL
288995	2004 TY_{64}	—	October 5, 2004	Kitt Peak	Spacewatch	THM	4.4 km	MPC · JPL
288996	2004 TN_{66}	—	October 5, 2004	Anderson Mesa	LONEOS	·	1.2 km	MPC · JPL
288997	2004 TL_{67}	—	October 5, 2004	Anderson Mesa	LONEOS	·	1.5 km	MPC · JPL
288998	2004 TS_{67}	—	October 5, 2004	Anderson Mesa	LONEOS	V	1.1 km	MPC · JPL
288999	2004 TU_{67}	—	October 5, 2004	Anderson Mesa	LONEOS	·	1.0 km	MPC · JPL
289000	2004 TB_{71}	—	October 6, 2004	Kitt Peak	Spacewatch	(31811)	3.5 km	MPC · JPL

back to top

== See also ==
- Meanings of minor-planet names: 288001–289000
