= Lithuanians in the Chicago area =

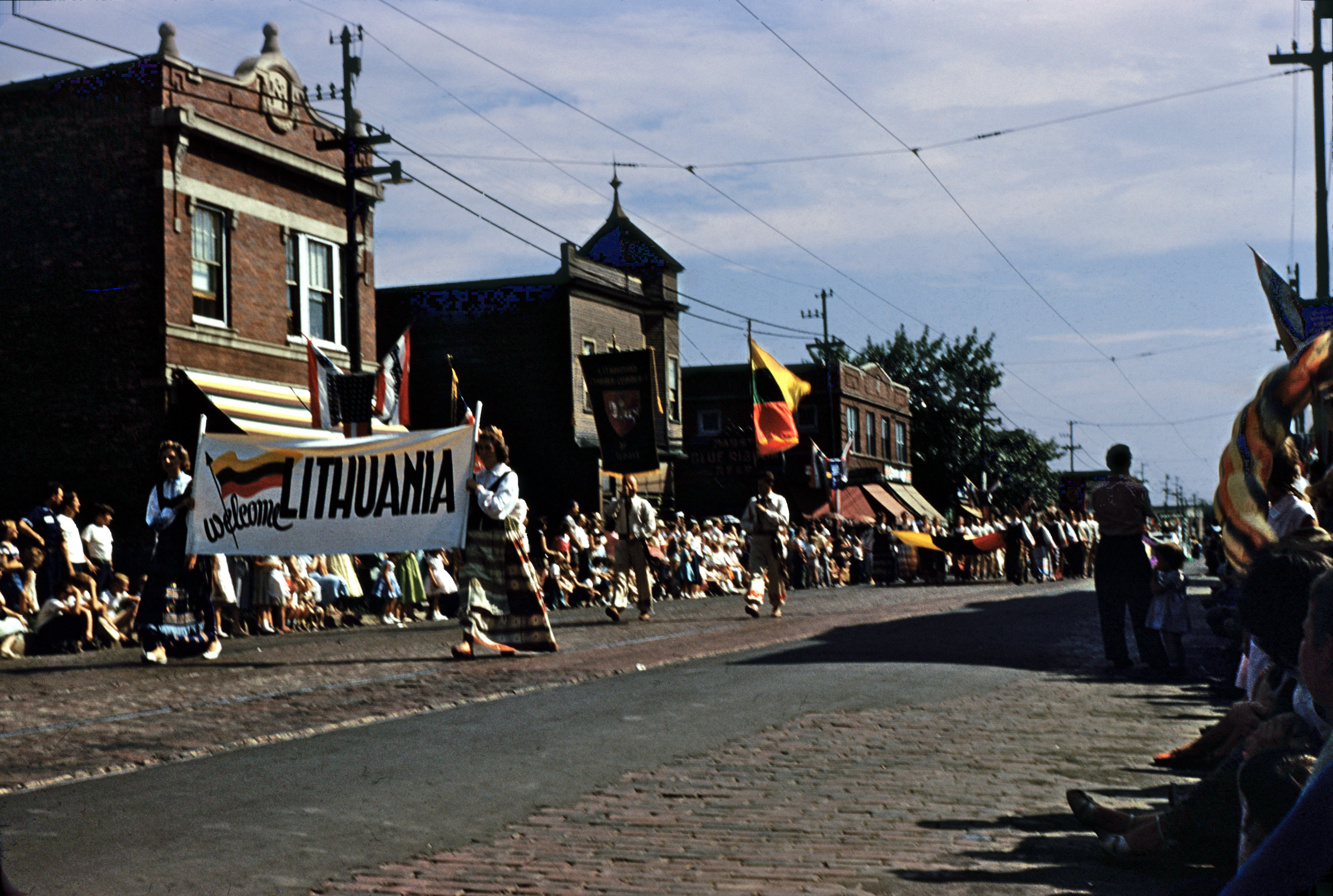
July 4th parade with marchers carrying a 'Lithuania' banner followed by a Lithuanian flag in the West Pullman area of Chicago, circa 1950

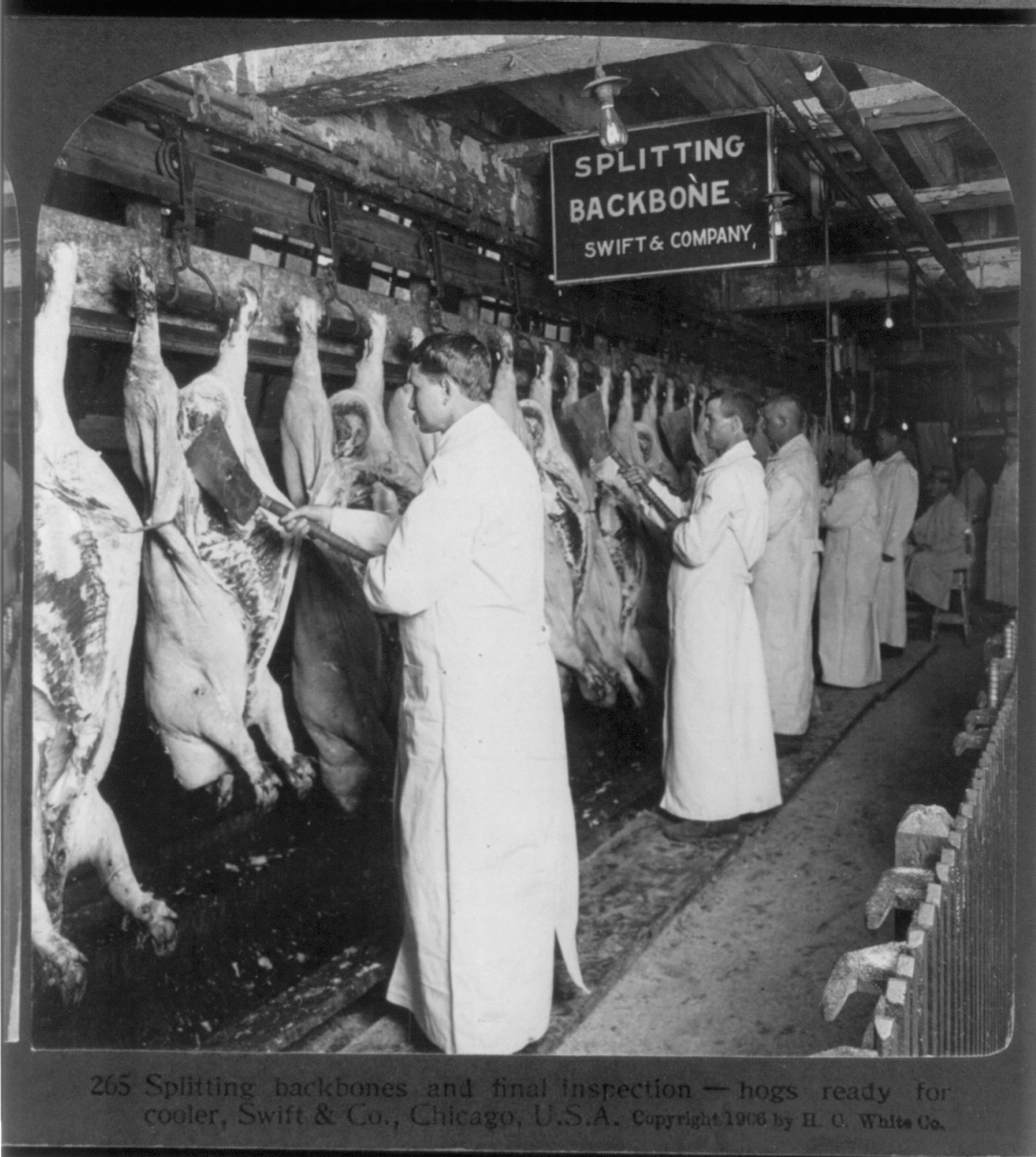
The Union Stockyards were at one time a significant employer of Chicago's Lithuanian community. Upton Sinclair's 1906 novel The Jungle, revolves around the life of a Lithuanian immigrant working the Stockyards named Jurgis Rudkus.

Lithuanians are a prominent ethnic group in the Chicago metropolitan area. Their presence goes back over a hundred years. The Chicago area has the largest Lithuanian community outside Lithuania. Chicago has been dubbed Little Lithuania and many Lithuanian Americans refer to it as the second capital of Lithuania. Lithuanian Americans from Chicago have had a significant impact on politics in both the United States and Lithuania. Census estimates as of 2023 number the Lithuanian population in the Chicago metropolitan area at 59,359. The population is declining, influenced partially by Lithuania's 2004 entry into the European Union, which has led a decrease in new arrivals to the United States.

== History ==
Lithuanians have been documented as arriving in the US since 1918, when Lithuania re-established its independence from Imperial Russia. Although this is the first official record, Lithuanians began arriving at least two decades earlier; however, they were listed as Russian citizens. This is compounded by the fact that, prior to Lithuanian independence, most if not all official documents were written in Russian, Polish or German. Thousands of Lithuanians moved to Chicago, providing a good source of labor for the growing city. The Lithuanian community in Chicago was immortalized by Upton Sinclair in his 1906 novel about the treatment of workers in the Chicago stock yards, The Jungle, whose story revolves around telling the life of a Lithuanian immigrant named Jurgis Rudkus.

== Geography ==
=== Lithuanian Downtown ===
The first and most prominent Lithuanian enclave in Chicago was called "Lithuanian Downtown" which was located along Halsted Street in Bridgeport. It was founded by Lithuanians who settled nearby their Old World neighbors, the Poles, who were located in a Polish Patch in the vicinity of St. Mary of Perpetual Help Church. It was here that the Lithuanian church of Saint George was founded as the first Lithuanian parish in the Midwest, foreshadowing the prominence that Bridgeport would play as one of the key centers of Lithuanian activity throughout the United States. A large number of the early buildings of this district were built by the first prominent Lithuanian community leader, Antanas Olšauskas, circa 1910. Centered on 33rd Street and Halsted, Bridgeport was Chicago's leading Lithuanian neighborhood from the 1890s through the 1950s.

=== Distribution ===
Although Lithuanians initially settled in areas adjacent to the ethnic group most familiar from their European homeland, the Poles, a pattern consistent with most other immigrant groups in Chicago, the Lithuanian community today is found all over the Chicago metropolitan area; as of 2023 there are 27,547 people of Lithuanian ancestry living in Cook County alone, with another 8,545 in DuPage County. Lithuanian immigrants established enclaves on the Southwest Side of the city during the 20th century, including in Bridgeport, Brighton Park, Marquette Park, and Back of the Yards. The adjacent near-western suburb of Cicero had an enclave of Lithuanians in the 20th century, especially around St. Anthony's Parish. The most recent wave of immigrants has settled in the western Chicago suburbs of Lemont, Darien, Homer Glen and Woodridge, towns which all have a sizeable Polish community as well (particularly Lemont and Homer Glen). There is a small enclave of Lithuanians around the Beverly Shores area in northwest Indiana at the southern coast of Lake Michigan, where there is an American-Lithuanian Club. Some Lithuanians moved on to work in Southern Illinois coal mines.

== Culture ==
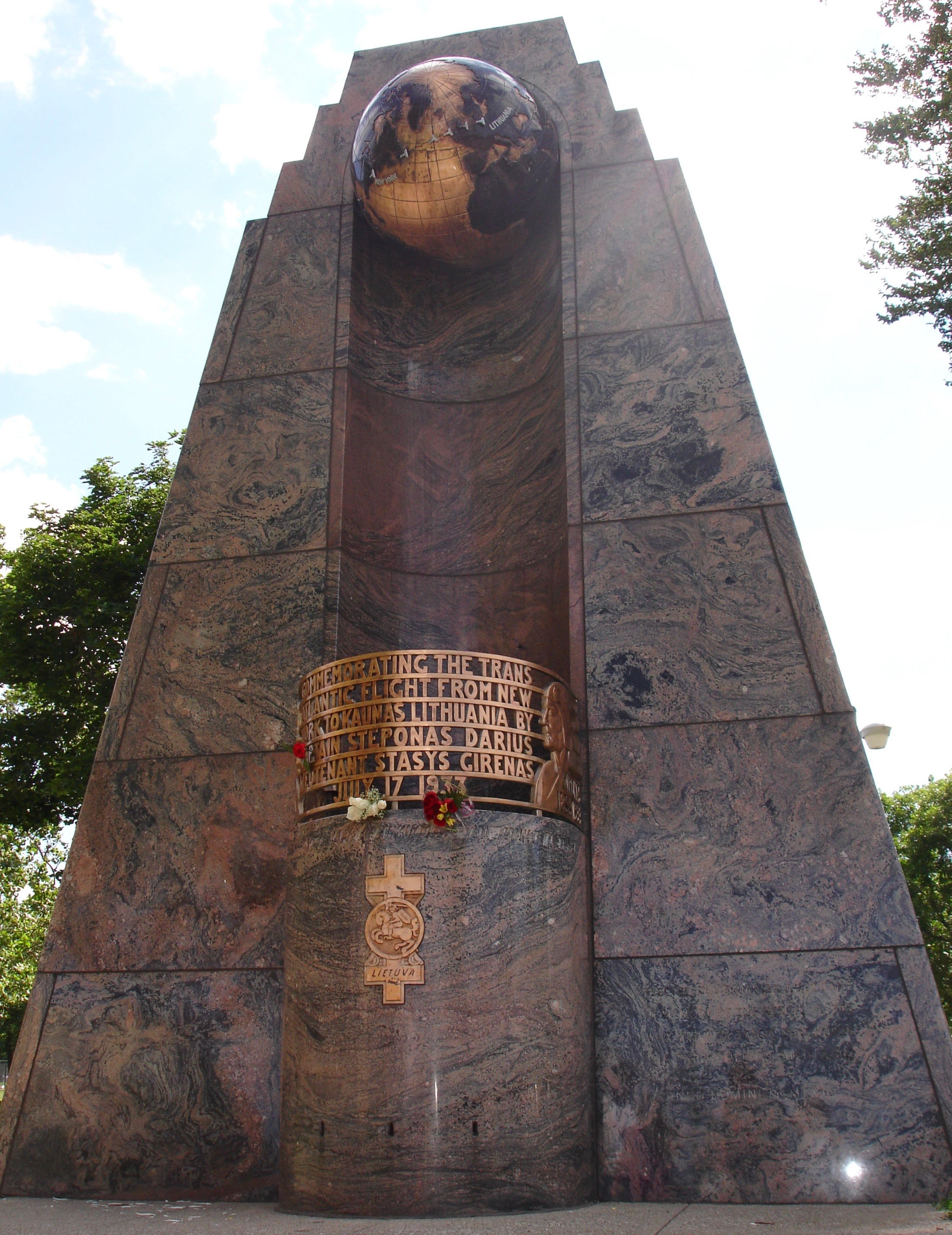
Monument to Steponas Darius and Stasys Girėnas in Marquette Park

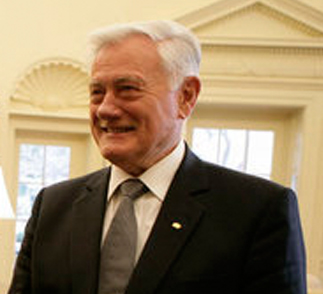
Valdas Adamkus was an active member of the Lithuanian community in Chicago for decades before becoming President of Lithuania.

The Chicago metropolitan area is the center of Lithuanian culture in North America. It has a number of Lithuanian restaurants, bookstores, and other shops. The former president of Lithuania from 1998-2003 and 2004–2009, Valdas Adamkus, is a former resident of the Chicago area. Chicago is home to the Consulate General of the Republic of Lithuania, and the city's large Lithuanian American community maintains close ties to what they call the Motherland. Chicago's Lithuanian heritage is visible in the cityscape through its Lithuanian-named streets such as Lituanica Avenue and Lithuanian Plaza Court as well as an Art Deco monument in Marquette Park commemorating pilots Stasys Girėnas and Steponas Darius who died in the crash of the aircraft Lituanica in 1933. The area just east of Marquette Park features such institutions as Maria High School, Sisters of St. Casimir Motherhouse, Holy Cross Hospital, and Nativity BVM Catholic Church, which have been associated with Lithuanians.

=== Churches ===
A number of the most architecturally significant churches of the Archdiocese of Chicago were built as national parishes by Lithuanian immigrants such as Holy Cross, Providence of God, Nativity BVM which is dedicated to Our Lady of Šiluva, and the now demolished St. George's in Bridgeport. Opulently decorated with a proclivity towards Renaissance and Baroque ornamentation, Lithuanian churches were designed in the spirit of the architecture of the Polish–Lithuanian Commonwealth's heyday. Like Chicago's Polish Cathedrals, these churches were statements meant to recall an era when the Grand Duchy of Lithuania spanned from the Baltic to the Black Sea, having been built at a time when Lithuania was under Russian occupation and incorporating Lithuanian imagery in its decor such as the Vytis to invoke pride in Lithuanian culture.

=== Museums ===
The Lithuanian Museum, owned by the Lithuanian Research and Studies Center, operates at the Lithuanian Youth Center (Lietuvių Jaunimo Centras, 5620 S. Claremont Avenue). The Museum is open and accessible when the Youth Center is open.

Opened in 1966, the Balzekas Museum of Lithuanian Culture is located in West Lawn, Chicago at 6500 South Pulaski Road. The purpose of the museum is to celebrate and preserve Lithuanian culture. As a non-profit organization, the museum began its collections from donations from within the community—such as limited antiques from the Balzekas family. The museum offers a variety of exhibits. Every two years the museum organizes tours to Lithuania.

The Lithuanian Folk Art Institute of Chicago can be found at the Lithuanian World Center in Lemont. The museum contains a variety of wood carvings, amber jewelry, Lithuanian national clothing pieces, sculptures, and many other traditional folk art.

=== Restaurants ===
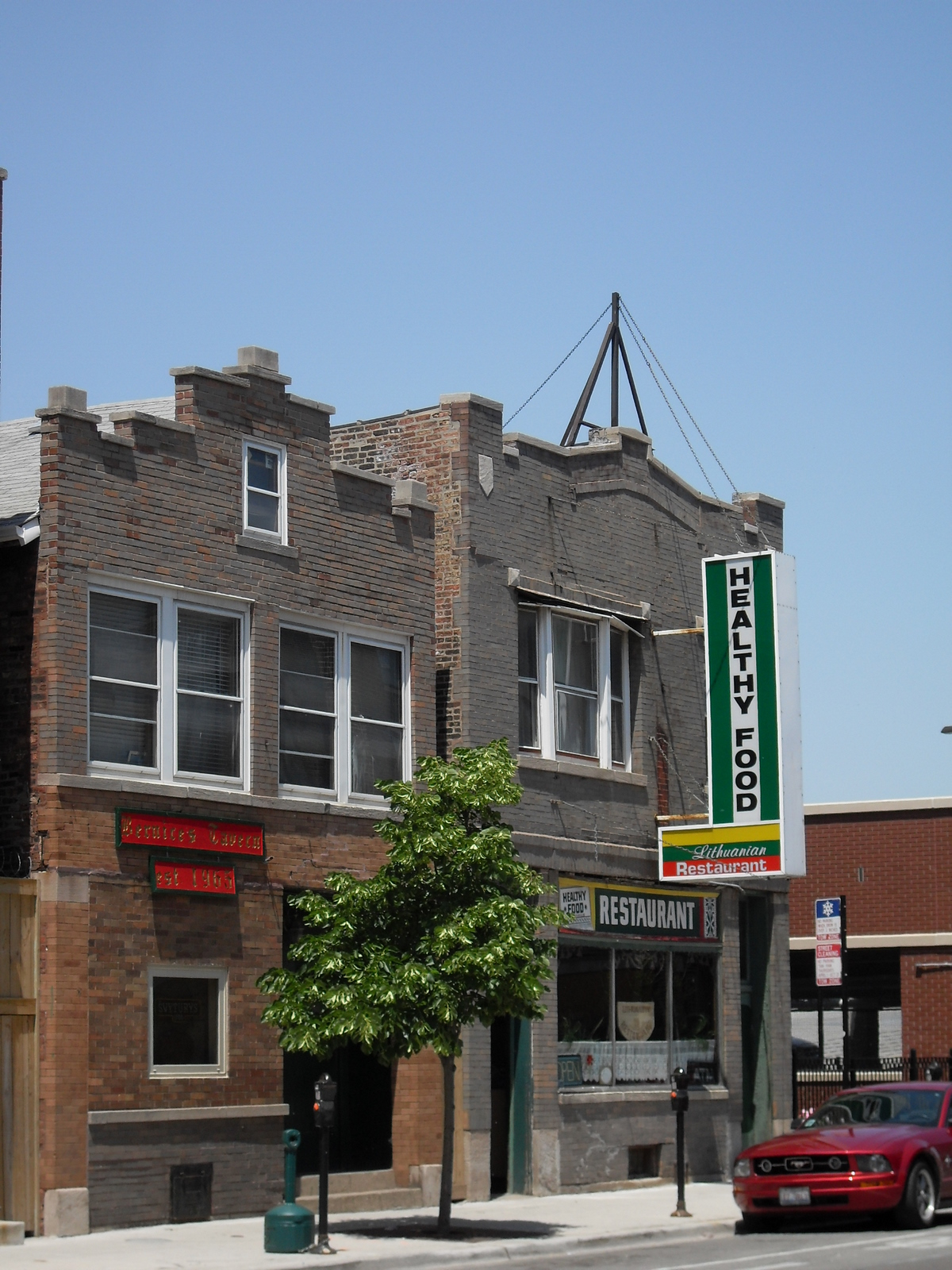
Lithuanian restaurant in Chicago

Opened in 1938, the Healthy Food restaurant was one of the first well-known Lithuanian restaurants in Chicago located on Halsted near 32nd Street, in the Bridgeport neighborhood. The restaurant decorated the place with a variety of traditional art. The restaurant closed its doors in 2009.

About a block away from the former Healthy Food restaurant is Bernice's Tavern, one of the few places Švyturys beer can be purchased in Chicago. The namesake of the bar died in 2017.

Grand Duke’s opened in 2005 located on Harlem Avenue in Summit, Illinois. In 2019, they relocated to Downers Grove. In 2012, Grand Duke’s opened up a sister restaurant Old Vilnius located in Darien.

=== Schools ===
There are a number of Lithuanian schools established in or near Chicago. At the Chicago Lithuanian Youth Center, the Lithuanian School of Chicago (Lith.: Čikagos Lituanistinė Mokykla), a private school for Lithuanian immigrant children, was founded in 1992. Other Lithuanian schools include Maironis in Lemont, Gediminas in Waukegan and Rasa in Naperville.

=== Media ===
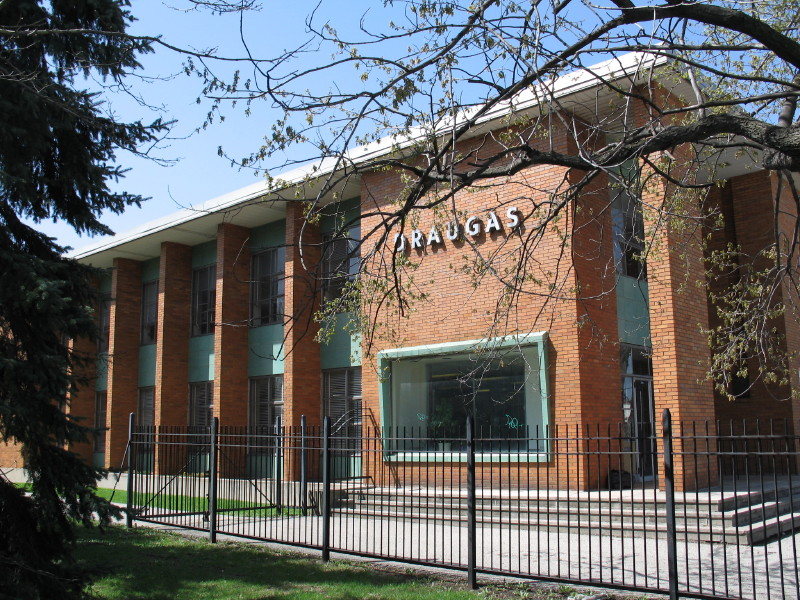
Draugas building in Chicago, IL

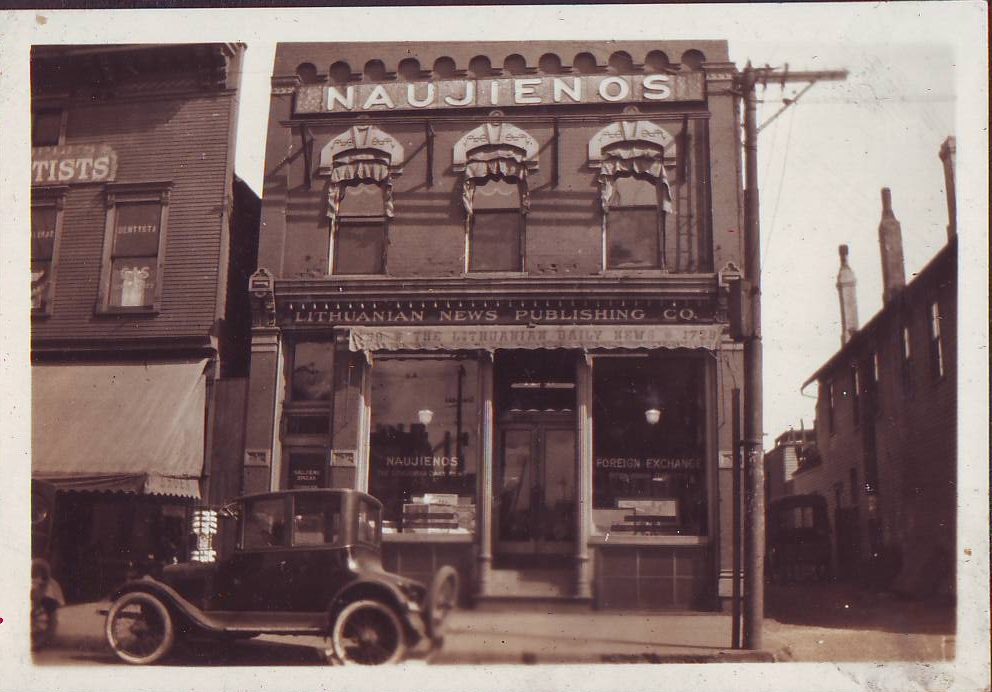
Naujienos

First published in 1903, the Draugas (Friend) is the first Lithuanian newspaper in the United States and is printed by the Lithuanian Catholic Press Society in Chicago. Other Lithuanian publications include Amerikos Lietuvis (Lithuanian American), Vakarai (The West), and Čikagos Aidas (Echo Chicago). These newspapers provide news and current events that involve Lithuanians living in Chicago, along stories from around the entire world, such as economic, political and social trends relevant to Lithuanian-speaking peoples. These publications can most often be found in local stores in which Lithuanians shop at, some examples are Brookhaven in Darien, Peter’s Deli in Lemont, and Lassak Deli in Willowbrook and these are also found online.

Naujienos was printed from 1914 through the 1980s, Vilnis was printed from 1920-1989, Liaudies Menas (The People's Art) was printed 1950–1951.

=== Festivals ===
The Lithuanian Song Festival (Dainų Šventė) and Dance Festival (Šokių Šventė) were held at the now-demolished International Amphitheatre. In recent years, the Song Festival has been held at the UIC Pavilion and the Dance Festival held in the suburb of Rosemont, Illinois.

=== Opera ===
The Lithuanian Opera Company of Chicago was founded by Lithuanian emigrants in 1956, and presents operas in Lithuanian. Lithuanian operas were sometimes held at Maria High School in Chicago, a school that has been associated with Lithuanians, and such operas are now sometimes held at Morton East High School in Cicero.

== Notable people ==
- Robert Zemeckis, filmmaker
- Joseph Kromelis, prolific homeless man known as "The Walking Man"
- Dick Durbin, Senate Majority Whip and 47th Senator from Illinois since 1997
- Kazys Grinius, former president of Lithuania
- Kazys Bobelis, surgeon and politician
- Vladas Jakubėnas, composer and pianist
- Valdas Adamkus, former president of Lithuania
- John C. Reilly, actor
- Kazys Bradūnas, poet and editor of several Lithuanian language journals
- Matas Buzelis, professional basketball player for the Chicago Bulls, born in Chicago and raised in Hinsdale

== Lithuanian sites in the Chicago area ==
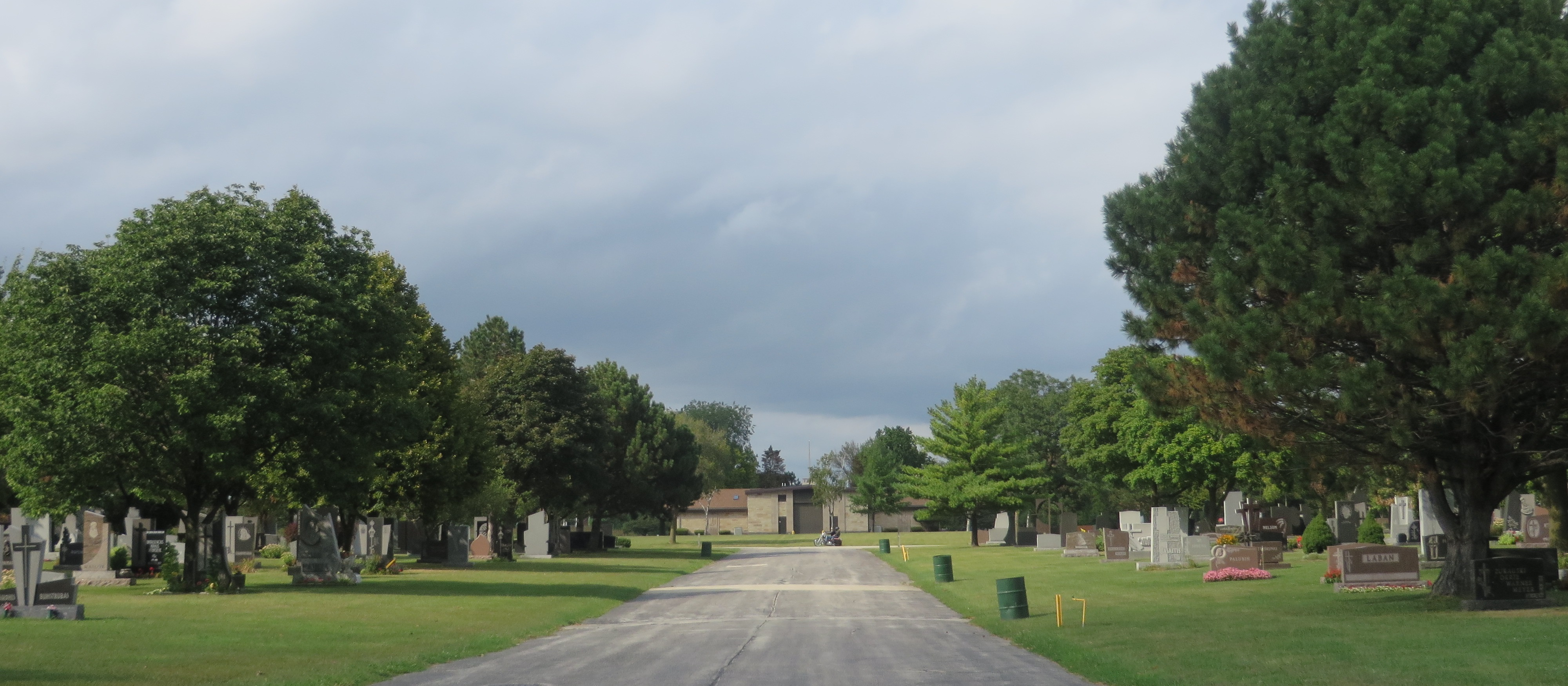
St. Casimir's Lithuanian Cemetery in Chicago

- The Lithuanian Research and Studies Center (Lituanistikos Tyrimo Centras) has two facilities. Its archival, periodical, audio-visual and musicology collections are in a 7,000 square foot self-owned facility at 15533 129th Street in Lemont. Its 75,000 volume library, Lithuanian Museum, Thomas Remeikis Political Science Library, Jonas Dainauskas History Library, Milda Budrys Medical Museum, military and art archives comprise another 7,000 square feet in the Lithuanian Youth Center (Lietuvių Jaunimo Centras, 5620 S. Claremont Avenue) in Chicago.
- Lithuanian World Center (Pasaulio Lietuvių Centras, 14911 127th Street) in Lemont, Illinois - a complex for Lithuanian culture including a sizeable Roman Catholic chapel, Matulaitis Mission, and classrooms for the Maironis Lithuanian School with classes held on Fridays and Saturdays, as well as various other facilities.
- Lithuanian Youth Center (Lietuvių Jaunimo Centras, 5620 S. Claremont Ave.) in Chicago's Gage Park neighborhood. At this location, there is a Jesuit Residence for Catholic Fathers and Brothers, the Youth Center, a Roman Catholic chapel, the Čiurlonis Gallery (Čiurlionio Galerija), and the Lithuanian Research and Studies Center, Inc. [Lituanistikos tyrimo ir studijų centras (LTSC)]. For a photo, see here.
- Consulate General of the Republic of Lithuania in Chicago (Lietuvos Respublikos generalinis konsulatas Čikagoje in Suite 800 of the NBC Tower) just north of the main Chicago River in Chicago's Magnificent Mile area.
- Ateitis Foundation Center (Ateitininkų Namai, 1380 Castlewood Drive) in Lemont, Illinois - a facility for the Lithuanian youth organization whose members are Ateitininkai.
- Balzekas Museum of Lithuanian Culture.
- Draugas Publishing House (Draugo Redakcija) in the West Lawn neighborhood of Chicago is the facility where the publication Draugas takes place.
- St. Casimir Lithuanian Cemetery (Švento Kazimiero Kapinės at 4401 W. 111th Street) is a Lithuanian cemetery of the Roman Catholic Archdiocese of Chicago in Mount Greenwood, Chicago where many deceased Lithuanians are buried.
- Lithuanian National Cemetery in Justice, Illinois
