= LTSC =

LTSC may refer to:

- Windows 10 LTSC
- Windows 11 LTSC
- a low-temperature superconductor in superconducting magnetic energy storage
- the IEEE Learning Technology Standards Committee of the IEEE Standards Association
- the Lithuanian Research and Studies Center (Lithuanian: Lituanistikos tyrimo ir studijų centras (LTSC))
