= Naujienos =

Naujienos is the title of two Lithuanian-language newspapers:

- Naujienos (apolitical newspaper), monthly published in 1901–1903 by Varpas editorial staff in East Prussia
- Naujienos (socialist newspaper), daily published in 1914–1980s by Lithuanian-Americans in Chicago
