= Villa Joseph Marie High School =

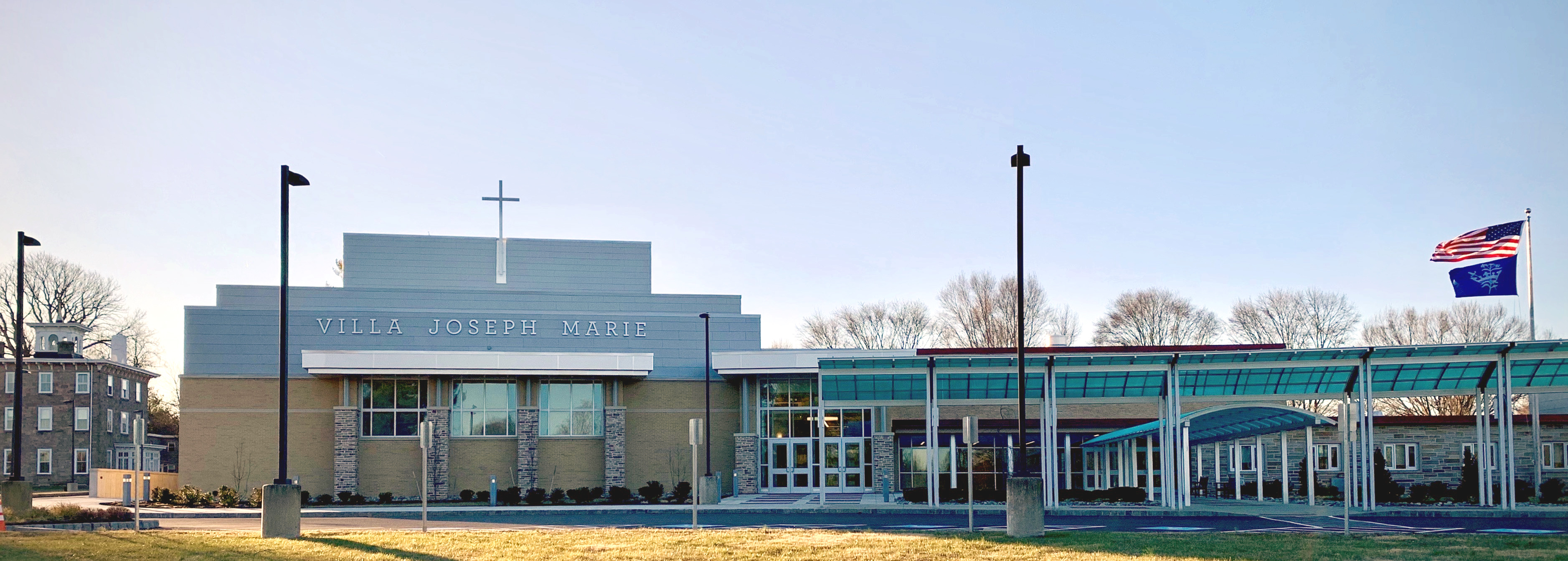

Location
- 1180 Holland Road; Holland, (Bucks County), Pennsylvania 18966; United States; 40°12′28″N 74°59′5″W

Information
- Type: Private, All-Female
- Motto: "Always more, Always better, Always with love"
- Religious affiliations: Roman Catholic; Sisters of St. Casimir
- Established: 1932
- Founder: Mother Maria Kaupas
- President: Ms. Jeanne M. Frawley ('94)
- Dean: Paula Soley and Connie D'Angelo
- Principal: Valerie Prucnal
- Grades: 9-12
- Enrollment: 400
- Average class size: 11
- Student to teacher ratio: 8:1
- Campus size: 72 acres (290,000 m^{2})
- Colors: Blue and Gold
- Athletics: Jems
- Athletics conference: Athletic Association of Catholic Academies
- Sports: 15
- Mascot: Jem Bear
- Team name: Jems
- Rival: Nazareth Academy High School
- Accreditation: Middle States Association of Colleges and Schools
- Publication: Quintessence (literary magazine)
- Newspaper: VJM Journal
- Yearbook: Corona
- Tuition: $17,750 (2021-2022)
- Athletic Director: Amy Barr
- Website: http://www.vjmhs.org

Villa Joseph Marie High School is a private Roman Catholic all-girls high school in Holland, Pennsylvania.

== Background ==
Villa Joseph Marie High School was established in 1932 by the Sisters of Saint Casimir. The school began as a small boarding school with the students living in Regina Hall and attending classes in Maria Hall. In 1957, the current school building was completed, and Villa became a traditional day school.

== Notable alumnae ==
- Murphy Agnew, soccer player
- Jo Piazza, Author
- Martina White, Pennsylvania State Representative
