= Gage Park massacre =

Murders of six members of the Martinez family in 2016

- Location: 41.7898°N 87.694°W; Gage Park, Chicago, Illinois, U.S.
- Date: February 2, 2016 c. 5:30 p.m. (CST)
- Attack type: Mass stabbing, mass murder, shooting, robbery, familicide
- Weapons: Firearm, three knives
- Deaths: 6 (5 by stabbing, 1 by gunfire)
- Injuries: 0
- Perpetrators: Diego Uribe and Jafeth Ramos
- Motive: Robbery
- Verdict: Guilty on all counts

The Gage Park massacre occurred on February 2, 2016, when six members of the Martinez family were murdered in their Gage Park home of Chicago, Illinois.

The family’s bodies weren’t discovered until two days later, when police went to the home to perform a well-being check. There, they found the bodies of all six family members; Noe Martinez, his wife Rosaura, their son Noe Jr., their daughter Maria, and Maria's sons, Leonardo and Alexi. Five of the victims were stabbed to death, and the sixth victim, Maria Martinez, was shot.

On May 19, 2016, police arrested Diego Uribe, a relative of the family, and his girlfriend, Jafeth Ramos, in connection to the murders, saying that the massacre was a robbery gone wrong. On October 5, 2022, Diego Uribe was found guilty in the murders, and on November 7, 2022, he was sentenced to life in prison. On December 6, 2022, 25-year-old Jafeth Ramos was sentenced to 25 years in prison.

== The massacre ==
Diego Uribe, who is the nephew of Maria Martinez's ex-husband, allegedly arrived at the Martinez household in the late afternoon or early evening of February 2, 2016 with the intention of robbing and killing the family. Uribe was let into the house as he was a frequent visitor to the house and apparently had a good relationship with Maria Martinez's two sons. Uribe then allegedly argued with Maria Martinez in the upper floor of the house before shooting her four times in the head. Noe Martinez Jr. rushed upstairs after hearing the shots, but Uribe allegedly beat him to death with his gun. Rosaura Martinez also rushed upstairs and was allegedly pushed downstairs by Uribe, who then grabbed several knives from the kitchen and stabbed her several times. Uribe then allegedly forced the young boys to retrieve cash, an Xbox and other valuables from various rooms in the house. Uribe then allegedly took the younger boy, Alexi, to the basement and stabbed him to death, and then returned upstairs and murdered the older boy, who begged for his life saying "Please no! Please don't! I just want to live!" Uribe then waited for the grandfather, Noe Martinez Sr. to arrive back to house from the store, whereupon he beat and stabbed him to death.

Uribe and Ramos made off with the Xbox, about $550 in cash and jewelry which they pawned for about $150. Ramos is not believed to have directly committed any of the murders but has been described as an "active participant" in the massacre.

The exact time at which the murders were committed is unknown, but the victims stop answering texts and phone calls to their cell phones between 5:30 p.m. and 6:45 p.m. on February 2.

== Discovery ==
Police were called to the home to perform a well-being check after a coworker of one of the victims, Noe Martinez Jr, expressed concern because the victim had not gone to work since February 2. The bodies were discovered at around 1:05 p.m. on February 4 and quickly identified. No one from the family had been seen since February 2. Police initially stated that the events may have been a murder-suicide but later ruled that all the deaths were homicides. The bodies were scattered throughout the entire home, which has led investigators to believe there were multiple attackers. Five of the victims were stabbed and beaten while the sixth, Maria Martinez, was shot to death.

Three different bladed weapons, believed to be knives, as well as a firearm, were used to commit the murders. However, none of the murder weapons were found, though a rifle was discovered in the house.

The family dog, Pelusa (Spanish for "fuzzy"), was found alive inside the house covered in blood.

== Investigation ==
=== Initial theories ===
Police did not ever believe that the killings were random and always believed that the family was specifically targeted, with Maria Martinez most likely being the primary target as she was shot rather than stabbed.

Police also thought that the family may have been mistaken for another family that was the actual target of the killer or killers.

=== Arrest of suspects ===
On May 19, 2016, Chicago police announced that they had arrested 22-year-old Diego Uribe and his 19-year-old girlfriend, Jafeth Ramos, in connection with the murders. Uribe was related to the Martinez family through marriage. Police say that he had intended to rob the family, but ended up killing them all instead and that Ramos was acting as some kind of accomplice.

The break in the case came when DNA from blood under Maria Martinez's fingernails matched Uribe. Uribe and several other family members had submitted DNA to authorities in March. Phone records also placed Uribe in the area when the murders occurred.

Uribe and Ramos confessed to the murders and were charged with first-degree murder and held without bail.

=== Background of the suspects ===
Uribe and Ramos were in a committed relationship and were living in the Little Village neighborhood of Chicago with their young child at the time of the murders. Uribe did not have any previous arrests though Ramos had been arrested in Cicero on October 6, 2015, for allegedly shoplifting. Both stated that they needed money for milk and diapers for their son as well as for a car.

Uribe was a frequent visitor to the Martinez household and was apparently a close friend of the two boys, with a neighbor stating, "[he] played with those kids all the time. That family loved him." However, there was apparently tension between Uribe and Maria Martinez over Martinez's divorce from Uribe's uncle. Uribe told police that he had "a lot of anger" over how she treated his uncle. Loudes Oliva, who raised Ramos, also stated that Uribe was very controlling of her and did not allow her to take showers, put on makeup or leave their home without his permission.

== Victims ==
- Noe Martinez Sr., 62
- Rosaura Martinez, 58, wife of Noe Martinez
- Noe Martinez Jr., 38, son of Noe and Rosaura Martinez
- Maria Herminia Martinez, 32, daughter of Noe and Rosaura Martinez
- Leonardo "Leo" Cruz, 13, son of Maria Martinez
- Alexis "Alexi" Cruz, 10, son of Maria Martinez

All of the victims were to be buried in Mexico. The Mexican Consulate of Chicago assisted in moving the bodies to Mexico.
