= Maria Kaupas =

Venerable Maria Kaupas SSC
- Born: Casimira Kaupas; January 6, 1880; Ramygala, Panevėžys, Lithuania
- Died: April 17, 1940 (aged 60); Chicago, Illinois, United States

Maria Kaupas, SSC, (January 6, 1880 – April 17, 1940) was an American religious sister who founded the Sisters of Saint Casimir in the Catholic Church.

== Life ==
=== Early years ===
Maria Kaupas was born on January 6, 1880, as Casimira Kaupas in Ramygala in the Russian Empire (present-day Lithuania). In 1897, at age 17, she emigrated to Scranton, Pennsylvania, in the United States. Her mission was to work as a housekeeper for her brother, Anthony Kaupas, who was pastor of St. Joseph Parish there. While in Scranton, Kaupas first met women in religious orders and found herself attracted by their way of life. She also saw how Lithuanian immigrants were struggling in American society because they could not speak English.

Overcome by homesickness, Kaupas returned to Lithuania in 1901. She resolved to enter a teaching religious congregation and then return to the United States to help Lithuanian immigrants. Kaupas' brother Anthony soon informed her that the Priests’ League in Pennsylvania wanted to establish a new religious order in that state to teach Lithuanian children. They invited Kaupas to start it and she agreed.

Kaupas entered the novitiate of the Sisters of Mercy of the Holy Cross in Ingenbohl, Switzerland, in October 1902. However, while she was in Switzerland, Anthony informed her in 1904 that the Priests Council failed to raise enough money to fund a religious order. Undeterred, Kaupas asked Anthony to find an American bishop to sponsor it.

=== Founder of religious order ===
In 1905, Bishop Jeremiah F. Shanahan of the Diocese of Harrisburg in Pennsylvania, agreed to sponsor a new Lithuanian congregation. The Sisters, Servants of the Immaculate Heart of Mary, a religious order in Scranton, agreed to accept Kaupas and two companions into their order. The three women then traveled to Pennsylvania in late 1905. In April 1907, Kaupas made her profession of religious vows to the new Congregation of the Sisters of St. Casimir was founded. At her investiture, Kaupas received the religious name Maria.

The Sisters of St. Casimir arrived in Mount Carmel, Pennsylvania in October 1907 and opened the Holy Cross School there in January 1908. Seeing the success of the new congregation in Mount Carmel, Lithuanian pastors across the nation started requesting their services. In 1911, the sisters established their motherhouse in Chicago, Illinois, home of a large Lithuanian population.

The sisters elected Kaupas as the superior general of their order in 1913. She would hold this position for over 20 years. In 1915, during World War I, the German Empire occupied Lithuania. Freed from Russian control, the Catholic church in Lithuania now had more freedom. Bishop Edward Ropp of the Diocese of Vilnius wrote to Kaupas, asking her to establish a branch of her order there. In 1920, Kaupas and several sisters traveled to Lithuania. Ropp gave the sisters the use of the Pažaislis Monastery near Kaunas. Over the succeeding years, the sisters opened schools throughout the nation.

In 1928, the Sisters of St. Casimir began their health care ministry with the opening of Holy Cross Hospital in Chicago.Kaupas founded a school at Villa Joseph Marie in Holland, Pennsylvania.

=== Death ===
Kaupas was diagnosed with bone cancer in 1932, but continued working for several years. Kaupas died in Chicago, Illinois, at the motherhouse on April 17, 1940.

=== Veneration ===
In 2010, the Congregation for the Causes of Saints at the Vatican determined that Kaupas had led a life of heroic virtue. Pope Benedict XVI declared her to be venerable

== See also ==
- List of venerable people
- List of Servants of God
