= Balzekas Museum of Lithuanian Culture =

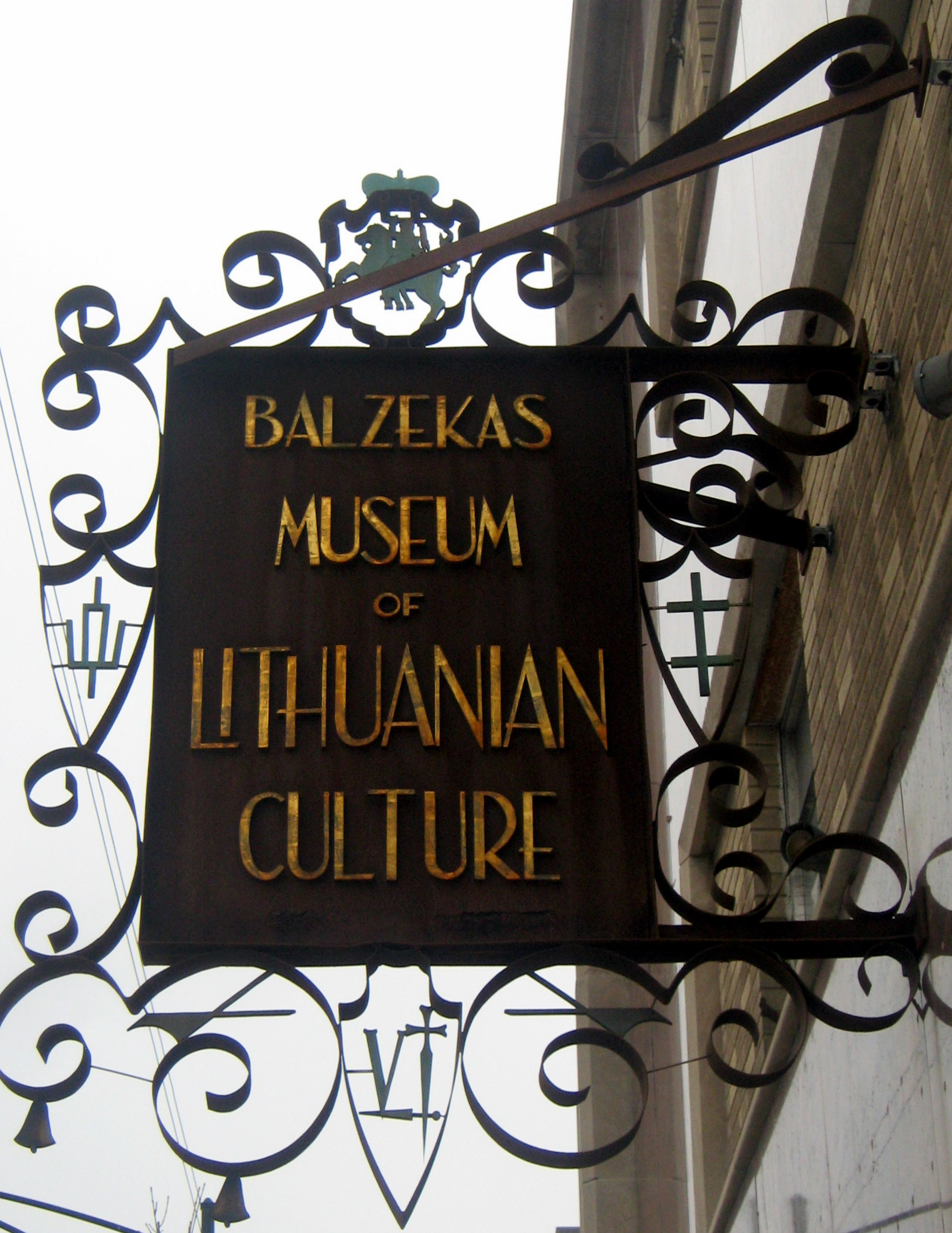
- Sign, 2009
- Established: 1966
- Location: 6500 S. Pulaski Rd. Chicago, Illinois
- Coordinates: 41°46′32″N 87°43′22″W
- Type: Ethnic museum
- Website: www.balzekasmuseum.org

The Balzekas Museum of Lithuanian Culture (Lithuanian: Balzeko lietuvių kultūros muziejus) is a museum in Chicago, United States. It is located on Pulaski Rd. in the city's West Lawn neighborhood, not far from Midway International Airport. Founded in 1966 by the Lithuanian-American businessman Stanley Balzekas, Jr., it is dedicated to the preservation and perpetuation of Lithuanian culture. It is the largest museum in the United States devoted to the subjects of Lithuania, the Lithuanian language, history, culture and politics, and to the Lithuanian-American experience.

The museum hosts events, programs, and workshops, such as traditional Lithuanian Užgavėnės mask making, vėlykaičiai or margučiai Easter egg decorating, and straw Christmas ornament making. It is a popular destination for tourists and schools.

The museum works cooperatively with other cultural, arts and educational organizations, fraternal orders, religious organizations and governmental institutions. Its bulletin, the Lithuanian Museum Review, is published quarterly.

Chicago's Lithuanian community has more Lithuanians and people of Lithuanian descent than anywhere in the world outside of Lithuania itself.
