= Gage Park High School =

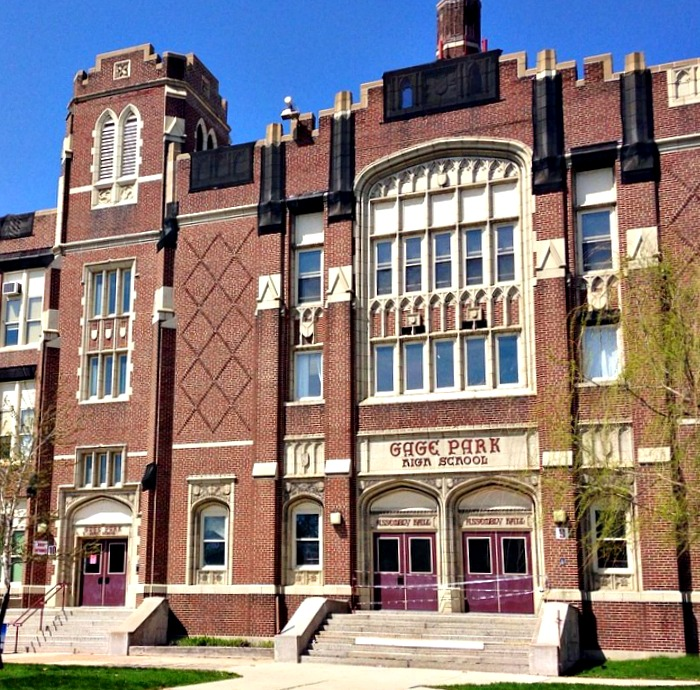

Location
- 5630 S. Rockwell Street; Chicago, Illinois 60629; United States; 41.7911°N 87.6895°W

Information
- School type: Public Secondary
- Motto: "On Time, On Track, and On a Mission."
- Opened: 1939
- School district: Chicago Public Schools
- CEEB code: 140835
- Principal: Anna Taglia
- Grades: 9–12
- Gender: Coed
- Enrollment: 415 (2022-23)
- Campus type: Urban
- Colors: Maroon; Grey
- Athletics conference: Chicago Public League
- Team name: Owls
- Accreditation: North Central Association of Colleges and Schools
- Website: gageparkhs.org

Gage Park High School is a public four-year high school located in the Gage Park neighborhood on the South Side of Chicago, Illinois, United States. Opened in 1939, Gage Park is operated by the Chicago Public Schools district. Gage Park also serves students living within three neighboring communities: Chicago Lawn, New City and West Englewood.

== History ==
Gage Park High School opened in 1939. Beginning in the late 1960s, racial tensions grew between black and white students at the school. In 1965, the school's boundary lines were changed, and black students first began attending classes. This action led to sporadic violence during the period from 1965 to 1969, leading eventually to several more serious events which occurred over a 3–year period beginning in 1969. In the summer of 1966, Martin Luther King Jr led open housing marches in the Marquette Park neighborhood located just south of the school in order to protest discrimination against blacks in housing caused by illegal redlining real estate practices. The first very serious incident at the school occurred December 1969 when six male students were arrested in a racial-motivated fight between white and black students at the school. In May 1970, a brawl erupted outside the school involving white and black students stemming from an incident during a lunch break.

The brawl resulted into six students being arrested and a Chicago police patrolmen being injured. Due to the racial tensions at the school, Gage Park PTA members and community members proposed a plan to shift the school's attendance boundaries which would affect the majority of the school's African-American students (600 in total); sending them to Englewood High School (which was majority Black). The PTA and community members stressed that enrollment at the time was 3,109, 800 over capacity for the building; The proposal was denied by Ald. Anna Langford. Langford stated the plan was only an excuse to remove blacks from the school.

After the alderman's decision, community members and protesters called for the Chicago Public Schools board to intervene and force the transfers of 650 students out of the school. In September 1972, a boycott began at the school involving white community members and parents choosing not to send their kids to school due to overcrowding. By the 12th day of the boycott, the Board of Education requested for the parents to end the boycott and register the students; which would result in knowing the exact figure of overcrowding at the school. The school board had proposed a plan to send white students to another area high school and black students to Hyde Park High School, which parents declined. Black parents charged whites with racism over the situation, blaming the school's PTA president Irene Schrader. In addition to whites boycotting the school, Black students, parents and members from Operation PUSH also boycotted the school in October 1972; charging that the boundary proposal was racially motivated.

By November 1972, A seven–point program to end violence and tension at the school was approved after a four-hour meeting with then- Chicago schools superintendent James Redmond, Chicago police superintendent James Conlisk and a committee of black leaders and parents. The plan included enforcement of truancy, enforcement of a five-point security plan and a more detailed relationship between school officials and police regarding students. Majority of the white parents and community members 11–week boycott ended days after the new plan was announced. In December of that year, Weeks after the school's plan was approved; Thirty–five white parents were arrested after they defied the school's security measures by demonstrating outside the school.

== Student Body and Graduation rate as of 2018 ==
Gage Park's student body is made up of: 61.8% Hispanic, 37.3% African-American, 0.6% Other, 0.3% White and 0.0% Asian. Gage Park High School currently has a 96.6% Freshman On-Track rate, 91.8% attendance rate, and a 71.8% 4-year graduation rate. 98% of seniors graduated in June 2018.

== Athletics ==
Gage Park competes in the Chicago Public League (CPL) and is a member of the Illinois High School Association (IHSA). The school's sport teams are named Owls. The boys' baseball team became Chicago Public League champions under the coaching of Paul Stanger in 1946–47. The boys' baseball team also became Public league champions in 1962–63. The golf team won the Chicago Public School League Championship in 1966. In the 2017–2018 season, the girls softball team became Public League champions.

== Extra-curricular activities ==
=== Sports ===
- Football
- Soccer (Boys'/Girls')
- Cheerleading (Girls')
- Pom-Pom (Co-Ed')
- Volleyball (Boys'/Girls')
- Basketball (Boys'/Girls')
- Baseball (Boys')
- Softball (Girls')
- Track & Field (Boys'/Girls')

=== Academic/Other ===
- National Honor's Society
- JROTC
- Art Club
- Student Voice Committee
- After School Matters
- B.A.M. (Becoming a Man)
