= Robert A. Vitas =

American political scientist

Robert Vitas
- Main interests: Military sociology, civil-military relations

Robert A. Vitas is a scholar of civil-military relations, national security strategy, and Lithuania studies. He was an army officer in the U.S. Army Reserve and a visiting scholar at Northwestern University. He is currently the executive director of the Inter-University Seminar on Armed Forces & Society. He is also the chairman of the Lithuanian Research and Studies Center. He received his PhD from Loyola University Chicago and has produced scholarship with other notable civil-military relations scholars such as John Allen Williams and Sam C. Sarkesian.

== Notable publications ==
- U.S. National Security Policy and Strategy: Documents and Policy Proposals, Volume Two, 1986–1994. Westport, CT: Greenwood, 1996. Co-editor with John Allen Williams.
- The United States and Lithuania: The Stimson Doctrine of Nonrecognition. New York: Praeger, 1990, 176 pp. Author.
- U.S. National Security Policy and Strategy: Documents and Policy Proposals. Greenwood, CT: Greenwood Press, 1988, 441 pp. Co-editor with Sam C. Sarkesian.
- Pedagoginis Lituanistikos Institutas 1958-1983 (Lithuanian Institute of Education 1958–1983). Chicago: Lithuanian Institute of Education, 1984, 152 pp. Editor.
- Civil-Military Relations in Lithuania Under President Antanas Smetona 1926–1940. Chicago: Lithuanian Research and Studies Center, 2004.
- “Civilian Graduate Education and the Professional Officer,” Military Review, 89, 3 (May–June 1999), pp. 47–58. Author. Later translated into Chinese by the Taiwan Ministry of Defense for use in officer education.
- "The Recognition of Lithuania: The Completion of the Legal Circle." Journal of Baltic Studies, 24, 3 (Fall 1993), pp. 247–262. Author.
- "The Molotov–Ribbentrop Pact." The Observer, 5, 9 (September 1988), pp. 6–7. Author.
