= St. George's Catholic Church (Chicago) =

Church building in Illinois, United States

Coordinates: 41.8351°N 87.6489°W

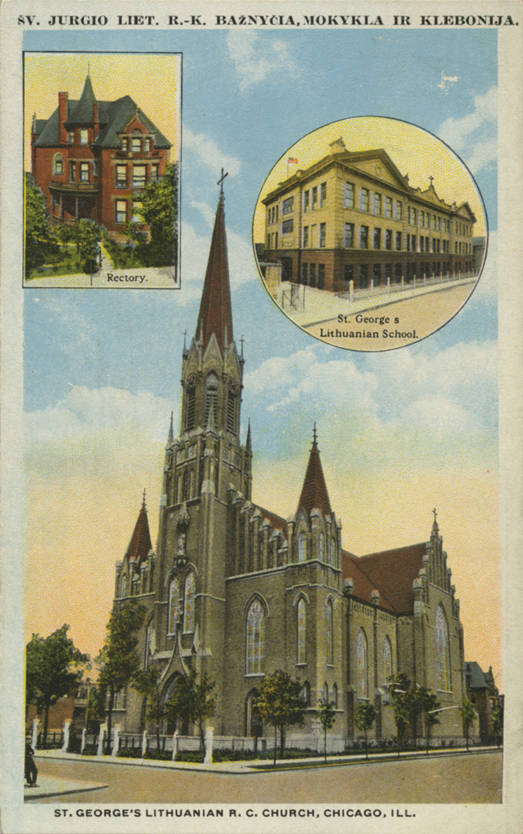
A postcard of the Church circa 1919

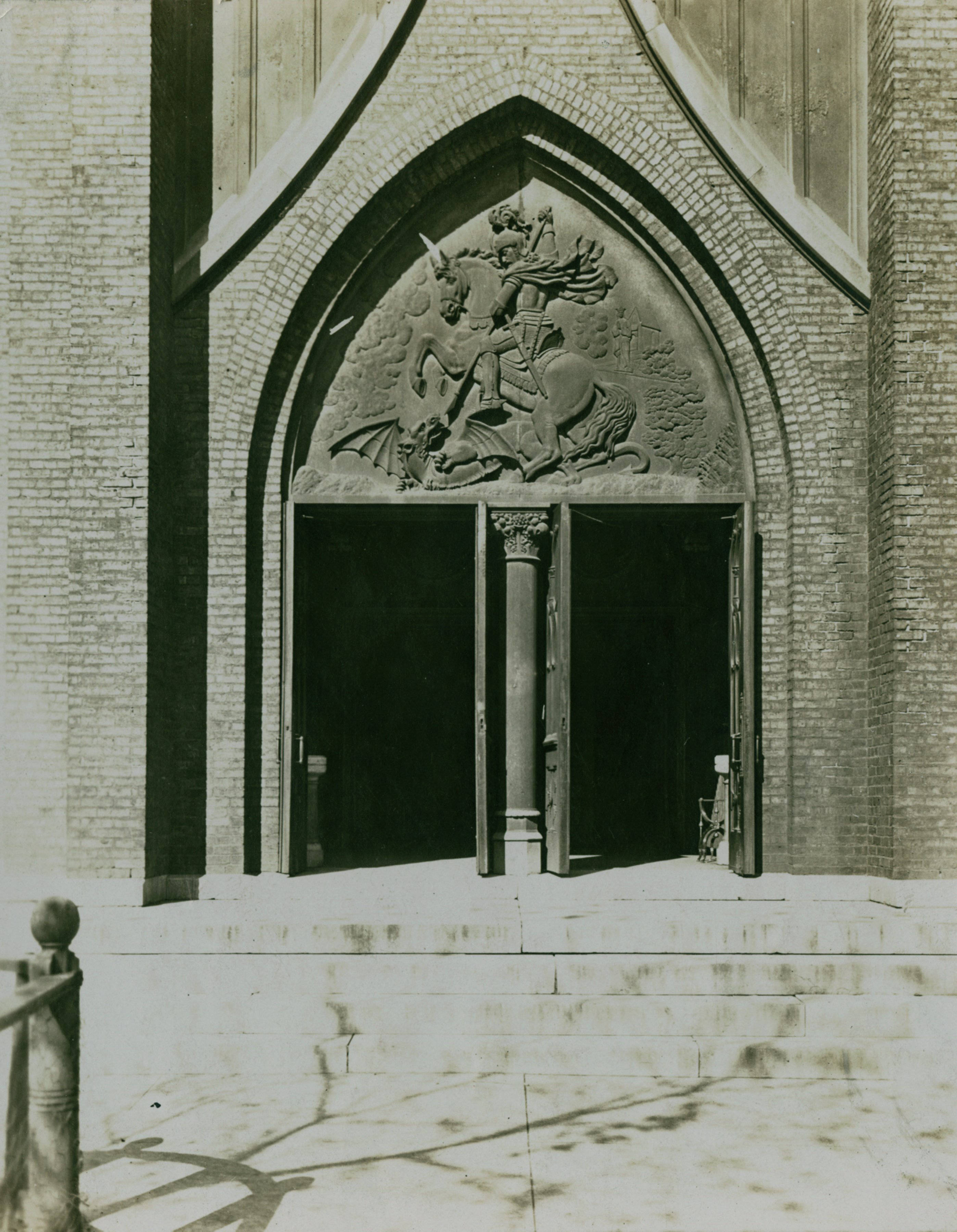
An image of St. George above the door of the church

St. George's Catholic Church was a predominantly Lithuanian-community Catholic church in Chicago, Illinois. It was built as a small wooden church in 1892 and then in 1896–7 built into a much larger brick and stone church near the Union Stockyards in Bridgeport. It was closed in 1990.
