= Čikagos Aidas =

- Type: Weekly newspaper
- Format: Tabloid
- Publisher: ETHNIC MEDIA, USA
- Founded: 2003
- Headquarters: 704 S. Milwaukee Ave. Wheeling, IL 60090; United States
- Price: Free
- Website: aidas.us

Čikagos Aidas (English: Echo of Chicago) is one of the largest Lithuanian-language weekly newspapers published abroad. It is distributed free of charge in the Chicago area of the United States. The full newspaper is available online and it also has its own radio station.
