= West Lawn, Chicago =

Community area in Chicago, Illinois

West Lawn
- Community area
- Community Area 65 - West Lawn
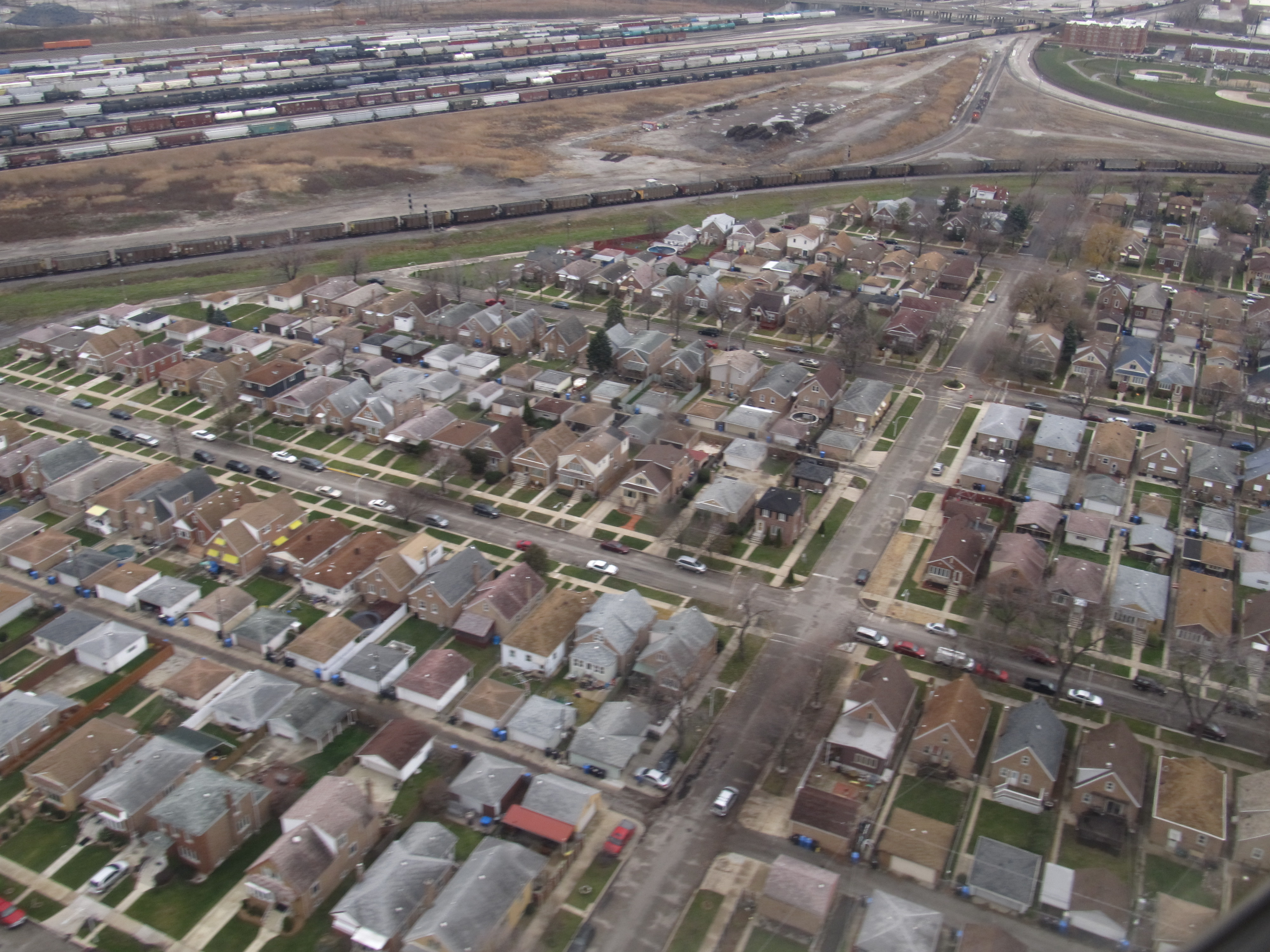
- Aerial view of West Lawn

- Location within the city of Chicago
- Coordinates: 41°46.2′N 87°43.2′W
- Country: United States
- State: Illinois
- County: Cook
- City: Chicago
- Neighborhoods: list: Ford City; West Lawn

Area
  - Total: 2.98 sq mi (7.72 km^{2})

Population (2024)
  - Total: 31,942
  - Density: 10,700/sq mi (4,140/km^{2})

Demographics (2024)
  - White: 8.6%
  - Black: 2.0%
  - Hispanic: 88.0%
  - Asian: 1.1%
  - Other: 0.3%

Educational Attainment 2024
  - High School Diploma or Higher: 69.9%
  - Bachelor's Degree or Higher: 18.0%
- Time zone: UTC-6 (CST)
  - Summer (DST): UTC-5 (CDT)
- ZIP Codes: part of 60629
- Median income 2020: $54,758
- Source: U.S. Census, Record Information Services

West Lawn, one of Chicago's 77 official community areas, is located on the southwest side of the city. It is considered to be a "melting pot" of sorts, due to its constant change of races moving in and out of the area, as well as the diversity that exists there. West Lawn is home to many Polish-Americans, Irish-Americans, Mexican-Americans, and other people of Latin American and Eastern European origin.

== History ==
Chicago Lawn, to the east, was settled while the marshy land of West Lawn remained unsettled. Some housing was built during the 1920s, but it still remained swampy land. Houses were built during the 1930s which then reported German-Americans, Irish-Americans, Polish-Americans, Czech-Americans and Italian-Americans living in the area. The area had been growing until the Great Depression, when the economy declined. After World War II, growth continued and new houses and streets were built. The Airport Homes race riots of 60th & Karlov in 1946 were intended to keep black people out of the area. After the 1970s, more Mexican-Americans, Irish-Americans, and Polish immigrants started settling the area.

== Notability ==
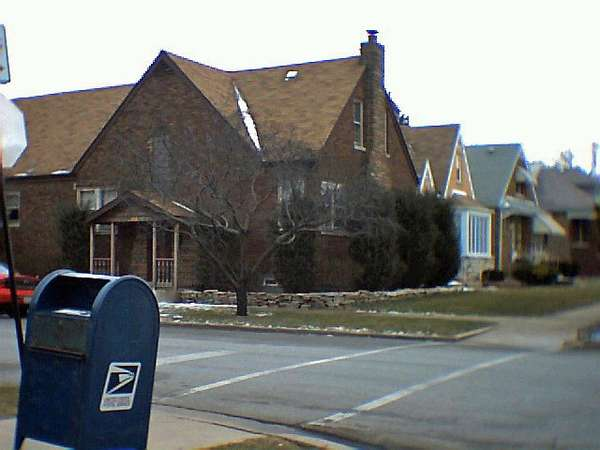
A residential corner in West Lawn

West Lawn is the home of the Balzekas Museum of Lithuanian Culture along Pulaski. It was founded by Lithuanian-American businessman Stanley Balzekas Jr., and is the only museum in the US devoted to the subjects of Lithuania, the Lithuanian language, history, culture and politics, and to the Lithuanian-American experience.

One small business in the neighborhood, the Capitol Cigar Store at 63rd and Pulaski, features a tall Native American statue as the landmark of West Lawn. The statue is most notable for being seen in the movie Wayne's World.

== Education ==
West Lawn is part of City of Chicago School District #299 and City Colleges of Chicago District #508.

Historical population
Census	Pop.	Note	%±
1930	8,919		—
1940	10,289		15.4%
1950	14,460		40.5%
1960	26,910		86.1%
1970	27,644		2.7%
1980	24,748		−10.5%
1990	23,402		−5.4%
2000	29,235		24.9%
2010	33,355		14.1%
2020	33,662		0.9%

== Ford City ==
Ford City is a neighborhood on the southwest side of Chicago which immediately surrounds the Ford City Mall, in turn named for the Ford Aircraft plant which previously occupied the site; the location was also the site of the Dodge Chicago Plant, which after World War II became the factory for the Tucker Car Corporation. In the future, the Orange Line of the Chicago "L" might be extended here.

== Notable people ==
- Michael Madigan, 67th and 69th Speaker of the Illinois House of Representatives. He is a current resident of, and incumbent member of the Illinois House of Representatives for, West Lawn.
- Frank Savickas, member of the Illinois Senate from 1970 until 1992. He resided in West Lawn during his political career, later moving to Venice, Florida.
- Leo Stefanos, inventor of the DoveBar.

== Politics ==
West Lawn has supported the Democratic nominee by large margins in the past two presidential elections. In the 2016 presidential election, West Lawn cast 8,429 votes for Hillary Clinton and cast 1,328 votes for Donald Trump (83.12% to 13.10%). In the 2012 presidential election, West Lawn cast 6,715 votes for Barack Obama and cast 1,443 votes for Mitt Romney (81.37% to 17.49%).

West Lawn is split between the 13th ward represented by Marty Quinn, and 23rd represented by Silvana Tabares on the Chicago City Council.

== See also ==
- South Side Irish
