= Holy Cross Hospital (Chicago) =

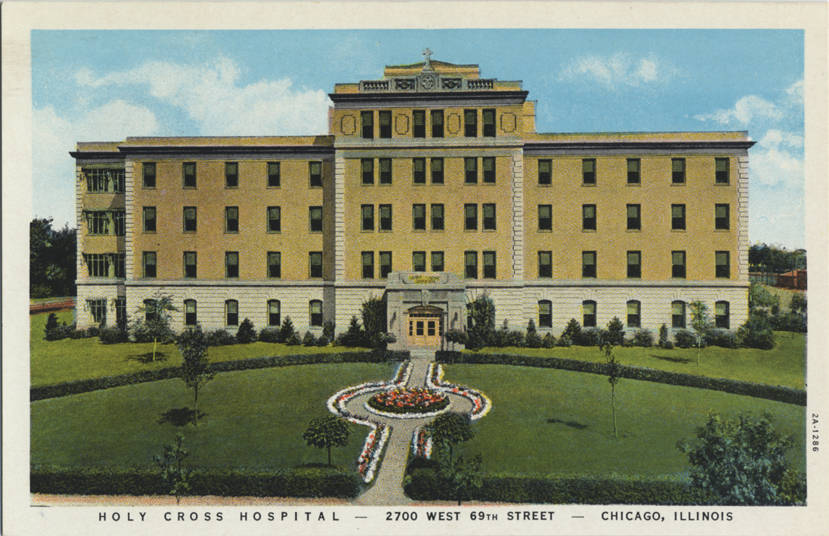
- c. 1932

Geography
- Location: Chicago Lawn, South Side, Chicago, Illinois, United States
- Coordinates: 41.76946°N 87.69239°W

Services
- Beds: 160

History
- Opened: 1928

Links
- Website: www.sinaichicago.org
- Lists: Hospitals in Illinois

Holy Cross Hospital is a 160-bed general medical Roman Catholic hospital located in the Chicago Lawn neighborhood of South Side, Chicago, Illinois, at 68th Street and California Avenue. It is part of the Sinai Chicago hospital system.

== History ==
The hospital was founded by the Lithuanian Roman Catholic Charities, a lay non-profit organization which entrusted the Sisters of Saint Casimir to manage it. Founded in 1928, Holy Cross Hospital is a not-for-profit neighborhood health system located in 3 locations throughout Chicago's southwest neighborhoods and suburbs. It receives the highest number of ambulance runs per year of any other hospital in the state of Illinois. The hospital is accredited by the American Osteopathic Association's Healthcare Facilities Accreditation Program.

In March 2009, Holy Cross completed an expansion of its emergency department, with the addition of 14 monitored patient rooms.

In early 2012, Holy Cross merged with Sinai Health System, as of 2022 called Sinai Chicago, which also operates Mount Sinai Hospital in Chicago's West Side. Because the two non-profits had merged their resources, Sinai Health System was not required to pay any monies to acquire Holy Cross.

=== Unfulfilled plans ===
In December 2010, Chicago Cardinal Francis Eugene George, OMI, announced that Holy Cross Hospital would become a for-profit Catholic hospital, a seemingly counter-intuitive move, and be acquired by Vanguard Health Systems of Nashville, Tennessee. It would still be considered Catholic because the Sisters would still have some reserved powers and the hospital would have to comply with the Ethical and Religious Directives for Catholic Health Care Systems, and because the Archbishop and the Holy See both had approved the unique transaction, given that no suitable Catholic or non-Catholic not-for-profit partner could be found. However, in August 2011 the transaction was cancelled, with both parties citing a downturn in the economy, as well as changes in Medicare and Medicaid, as the major factors for dissolving the partnership.

On September 10, 2015, a partnership between the University of Chicago and Sinai Health Systems was announced, in which the current Holy Cross Hospital campus would undergo 40 million dollars' worth of renovations and become Chicago's first South Side adult Level 1 trauma center since 1991. The state-of-the art adult Level 1 trauma center that was to open at Holy Cross Hospital was to be a joint effort of Sinai Health System and University of Chicago Medicine. Sinai Health System was to furnish specialists involved in trauma care, including emergency department physicians, anesthesiologists and nursing staff, along with on-site trauma care support services at Holy Cross Hospital. In addition, University of Chicago Medicine would have provided specialists dedicated to trauma care, plus neurologists, neurosurgeons, orthopedic surgeons, plastic surgeons, radiologists and urologists. On December 17, 2015, the University of Chicago announced that it had reversed course and that the new adult trauma center would now be located on the University of Chicago campus in Hyde Park instead of at Holy Cross Hospital. In that way, the University of Chicago would offer an integrated program of Level 1 trauma care for both children and adults, in addition to its existing Burn and Complex Wound Center.
