= Vilnis (Chicago newspaper) =

Lithuanian language communist newspaper

Vilnis ('Wave') was a Lithuanian language communist newspaper published from Chicago, the United States 1920–1989. The first issue was published on April 8, 1920, following the split of the Socialist Party of America. The founder of Vilnis, Vincas Andrulis, became its editor.

Vilnis was a daily newspaper but became a weekly in its later years. Vilnis was issued by the Workers Publishing Association. By the mid-1920s, Vilnis had a circulation of around 11,500.

When the New York-based publication Daily Worker ceased publication in 1958, Vilnis became the most widely circulated communist daily in the country. It had a circulation of around 32,000. As of 1968 Vilnis was a semi-weekly, with a circulation of 5,000. By the mid-1970s, the circulation of Vilnis (published thrice weekly) had dropped to 2,500. The association that published Vilnis later became the Workers Education Society.

== See also ==
- Naujienos (socialist newspaper)
- Non-English press of the Communist Party USA
