= Joseph Kromelis =

Chicago-area homeless man (1947–2022)

Joseph Kromelis (1947 – December 11, 2022) known as 'Walking Man', 'Walking Dude' or Walking Yanni was a Chicago-area homeless man and street vendor known for his physical appearance and for wandering about the city. He typically dressed in a v-neck t-shirt and a suit and kerchief, and had long, wavy hair and a thick mustache.

Sources differ as to whether Kromelis was born in Germany or Lithuania. His family lived in Lithuania, and while Kromelis was still a child, moved to Chicago where they managed a bar on Halsted street. After his family moved to Michigan, Kromelis remained in Chicago and found work in a factory. He later obtained a peddler's license, and sold jewelry for income while wandering the Loop.

Over the decades, he became a noted Chicago personality. He was the subject of a 2006 documentary called "Dudementary". About his fame, Kromelis stated “I’m like the Kardashians — I’m famous for doing nothing.”

== Victim of assaults ==
In 2016, another homeless man beat Kromelis with a baseball bat. After his hospitalization, his name and some details about his background became public.

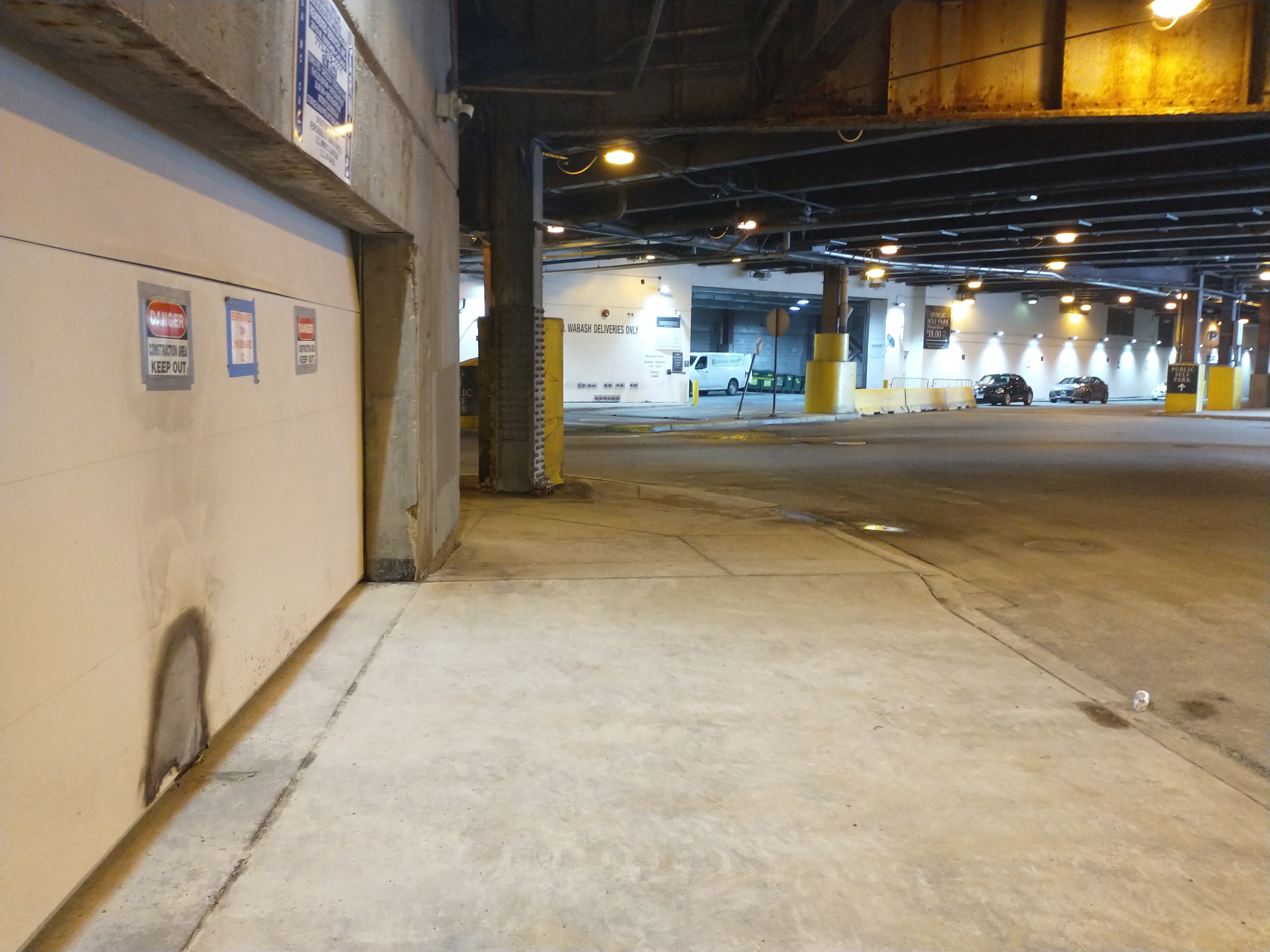
The scene where Kromelis was lit on fire on lower Wabash avenue. Burn mark visible on garage door.

On May 25, 2022, Kromelis was the victim of an unprovoked arson attack by Joseph Guardia while he slept under a bridge. The attack left him with burns over 40-65% of his body.

== Death ==
Kromelis died on December 11, 2022, at the age of 75, as a result of the injuries he sustained in the arson attack. After donations, his remains were interred in St. Boniface Cemetery.

On October 24, 2024, Joseph Guardia was sentenced to 47 years in prison for Kromelis’s murder.
