= Gage Park, Chicago =

Community area in Chicago, Illinois

Gage Park
- Community area
- Community Area 63 - Gage Park
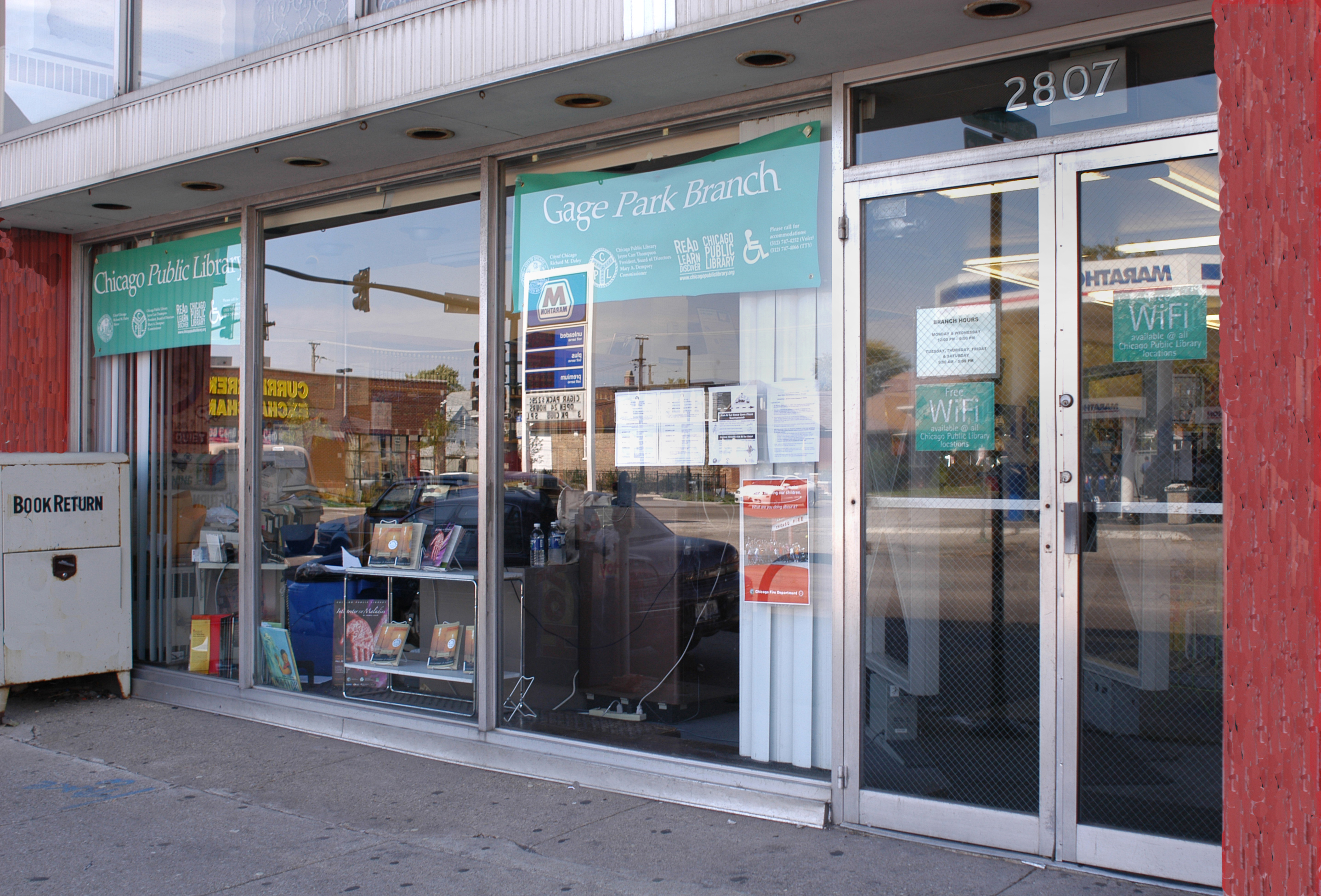
- Gage Park branch of Chicago Public Library on 55th Street.

- Location within the city of Chicago
- Coordinates: 41°47.4′N 87°41.4′W
- Country: United States
- State: Illinois
- County: Cook
- City: Chicago
- Neighborhoods: list: Gage Park; Marquette Manor; Glendale; Garfield Manor

Area
  - Total: 2.24 sq mi (5.80 km^{2})

Population (2024)
  - Total: 36,081
  - Density: 16,100/sq mi (6,220/km^{2})

Demographics (2024)
  - White: 3.6%
  - Black: 6.2%
  - Hispanic: 88.8%
  - Asian: 0.7%
  - Other: 0.6%

Educational Attainment (2024)
  - High School Diploma or Higher: 66.0%
  - Bachelor's Degree or Higher: 11.8%
- Time zone: UTC-6 (CST)
  - Summer (DST): UTC-5 (CDT)
- ZIP Codes: parts of 60609, 60629, 60632 and 60636
- Median income (2020): $42,271
- Source: U.S. Census, Record Information Services

Gage Park is one of Chicago's 77 well-defined community areas, located on the city's southwest side; it is also the name of a park within the neighborhood. Gage Park's population is largely working-class, and its housing stock is mostly bungalows. For generations, the neighborhood was predominantly Eastern European and Irish Catholic. Today, the neighborhood is predominantly Hispanic and remains overwhelmingly Catholic. Gage Park is bounded by 49th Street to the north, 59th Street to the south, Central Park Ave to the west, and Leavitt Street to the east.

== History ==
The development of Gage Park began in 1873 when South Park Commissioner George W. Gage began working on a planned park at the intersection of Western Ave. and Garfield Boulevard. Upon Gage's death in 1875, the park was renamed Gage Park in his honor.

The area developed after Gage's passing, slowly adding more and more land and offering up more services to the local community. By 1919, Gage Park had added more land and the park now included ball fields, tennis courts, separate men's and women's gymnasiums, gardens, and a wading pool. A large field house and auditorium was later added in 1928, with a large mural by Tom Lea added in 1931.

On February 4, 2016, the bodies of six people were discovered in a home on the 5700 block of South California Avenue.

== Education ==
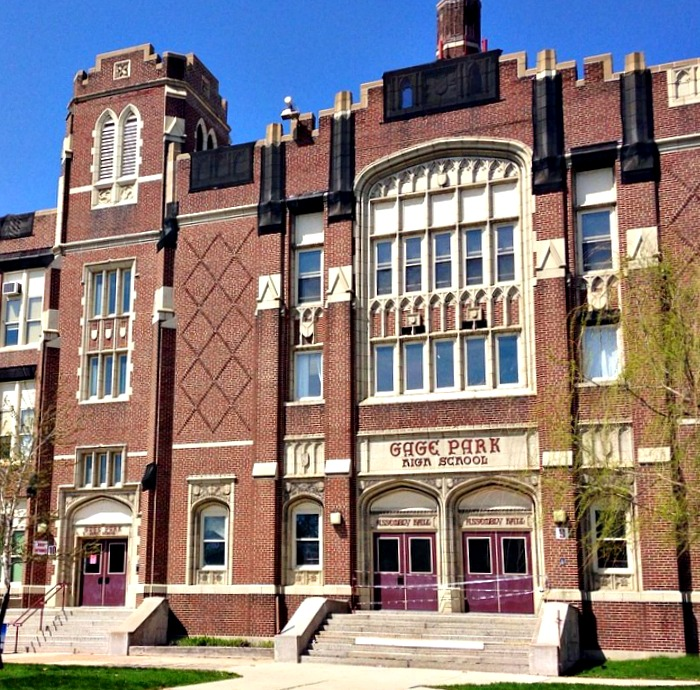
Gage Park High School

Chicago Public Schools operates district public schools.

- K-8 schools serving sections of Gage Park include Morrill, Carson, Talman, Nightingale, Christopher, Fulton, Henderson, Sawyer, Tonti, Sandoval, and Hernandez.
- Gage Park High School serves most of the community area. Some sections are served by Hubbard, Kelly, Curie, and Solorio high schools. Gage Park High School is located on South Rockwell Street, where 728 students attended during the 2013–2014 school year. Of the 728, 96.6% were from low-income households and 18.3% are homeless. The average ACT score in 2014 was 15.2 with the state average being 20.

The United Neighborhood Organization operates the charter schools Rufino Tamayo School and Jovita Idar School.

== Politics ==
The Gage Park community area has supported the Democratic Party in the past two presidential elections. In the 2016 presidential election, the Gage Park cast 6,966 votes for Hillary Clinton and cast 494 votes for Donald Trump (90.44% to 6.41%). In the 2012 presidential election, Gage Park cast 5,725 votes for Barack Obama and cast 554 votes for Mitt Romney (90.27% to 8.74%).

Historical population
Census	Pop.	Note	%±
1930	31,535		—
1940	30,343		−3.8%
1950	30,149		−0.6%
1960	28,244		−6.3%
1970	26,698		−5.5%
1980	24,445		−8.4%
1990	26,957		10.3%
2000	39,193		45.4%
2010	39,894		1.8%
2020	39,540		−0.9%

== Religion ==
The Roman Catholic Archdiocese of Chicago operates Catholic churches. On July 1, 2020, St. Gall Parish incorporated St. Simon the Apostle Parish into its structure, and St. Gall became the main church of the merged entity. On the same day, St. Rita of Cascia Parish incorporated St. Clare of Montefalco, and the former became the main church of the combined entity.

== Notable people ==
- Victor Adeyanju, defensive end in the National Football League. Adeyanju, who lived in Gage Park from age seven until graduating from high school, played for the St. Louis Rams from 2006 to 2010.
- Bill Redmond, Republican member of the United States House of Representatives from New Mexico's 3rd congressional district from May 13, 1997 – January 3, 1999. He was raised in Gage Park and attended Gage Park High School.
- James Adeyanju, defensive end in the National Collegiate Athletic Association. Adeyanju, who lived in Gage Park from birth until graduating from high school, played for the University of Wisconsin–Madison Badgers from 2011 to 2014. He now lives in the San Francisco Bay Area.
