= Maria High School =

Location
- 6727 South California Avenue; Chicago, Illinois 60629; United States; 41°46′15″N 87°41′33″W

Information
- Type: Private, All-Girls
- Motto: Maria Women Make a Difference in the World.
- Denomination: Roman Catholic
- Established: 1911
- Closed: 2013
- Grades: 9–12
- Colors: Blue and Gold
- Athletics conference: Girls Catholic Athletic Conference (GCAC)
- Accreditation: North Central Association of Colleges and Schools
- Newspaper: Maria Herald
- Website: www.mariakupascenter.com

Maria High School was a private, Roman Catholic, all-girls high school in Chicago, Illinois. Its building survives and is located near Marquette Park and Holy Cross Hospital, within the Roman Catholic Archdiocese of Chicago.

== Background ==
The school's predecessor, St. Casimir Academy, was established in the Marquette Park area of Chicago, Illinois, in 1911 by the Sisters of Saint Casimir. Due to increased demand, a bigger but adjacent school was built and opened in 1952 as Maria High School.

== History ==
Maria Kaupas, who would be the future Mother Maria (foundress of the order of the Sisters of St. Casimir), was born on January 6, 1880, in Lithuania. At the age of 17 she immigrated to Pennsylvania and worked as a housekeeper and then as a teacher of religion. In 1907, she founded the Sisters of St. Casimir in Scranton, Pennsylvania. Later, the order purchased about ten acres of prairie land at Marquette Road and Rockwell Avenue in Chicago. The sisters arranged everything for the construction of a school, St. Casemir Academy, which was completed in 1911 and opened with 21 students. Increased demand from prospective students led to the building of a modern high school, adjacent to the academy, in 1952. It was named Maria High School both for their foundress Mother Maria and the Blessed Mother. Maria High School officially opened on September 8, 1952. About 14,000 young women graduated from the school throughout its years of operation.

== Uniforms ==
Students at Maria High School were required to wear uniforms.

Starting from the early 1950s, the entire student body wore a uniform consisting of a navy blue A-line skirt with a "bolero" jacket (collarless, with long sleeves, and with a hook only at the neck). The blouse was white cotton with short sleeves and a "Peter Pan" collar (rounded). Navy blue head pieces called "beanies" (round skull cap) were worn when attending Mass. In the late 1950s, students were allowed to wear hosiery but it had to be plain (no black, no grey, no white). The skirt and bolero were made of a wool-type material and could not be laundered. Both items had to always be dry cleaned.

For gym classes, students changed into a one-piece turquoise blue jump suit that came to mid-thigh and had elastic around each leg. It had to be buttoned-up and there was a fabric belt attached. White socks and white gym shoes were required.

Starting with the 1964 school year and continuing until at least 1976, the uniform changed to be more user-friendly. It consisted of a brown straight skirt that had a couple of pleats at the bottom on each side to allow for ease of movement. A brown sleeveless vest with a V-neck that buttoned in front was also required. The blouse was short sleeved with a pointed collar and a brown clip tie was part of the uniform. The tie was actually a fabric strip that crossed over itself in the front. The school wanted to have a way to identify students according to their year in school, therefore, Freshman wore green blouses, Sophomores wore yellow blouses; Juniors wore pink blouses; and Seniors wore light blue blouses. The head piece was also changed from a beanie to a round lace piece of fabric. This was the era of sprayed and teased hairdos so the change to this lace fabric was very much appreciated by most of the students.

During the above time period, students were required to wear black footwear, no higher than 1 1/2", and the shoes had to have rubber soles so as not to scratch or mark-up the marble flooring that was throughout the hallways and general areas.

There was no jewelry allowed until about 1964 when ear piercing became popular. Students were allowed to only wear gold/gold-colored studs in their ears. Wearing a watch on the wrist was also acceptable but no bracelets, necklaces, etc. were permitted.

== Holy Cross Hospital ==
Holy Cross Hospital was sponsored by the Sisters of St. Casimir in 1928. Holy Cross Hospital has been expanded throughout the years and has served many people in need. More than eighty years ago, the Sisters of St. Casimir built Holy Cross Hospital for one purpose; healing. By the time Holy Cross Hospital was built, there were many immigrant families, there were tough economic times, and there were not enough resources for health care. Mother Maria Kaupas and the Sisters of St. Casimir expanded the hospital, and it grew to care for others. To this day, the hospital treats many people who struggle at times to make ends meet. Their mission stays true to Mother Maria's commitment to treat all people with respect and love.

== Closing and conversion to a charter school ==
Maria High School closed as a Catholic all-girls high school in June 2013, because of declining enrollment and financial challenges. Enrollment dropped from a peak of 1,400 students in the 1960s and 1970s to only 207 students by 2011. The Sisters of St. Casimir raised $10 million between 2006 and 2011 but it was not enough to continue the operation. The school now operates as a co-ed public charter school renamed Catalyst-Maria; it opened in the fall of 2013. It will ultimately accommodate students in kindergarten through grade 12.

== Notable alumnae ==
- Anne McGlone Burke, Illinois Supreme Court Justice
- Anita Alvarez, Cook County State's Attorney
