= Naujienos (socialist newspaper) =

Lithuanian-language socialist daily newspaper

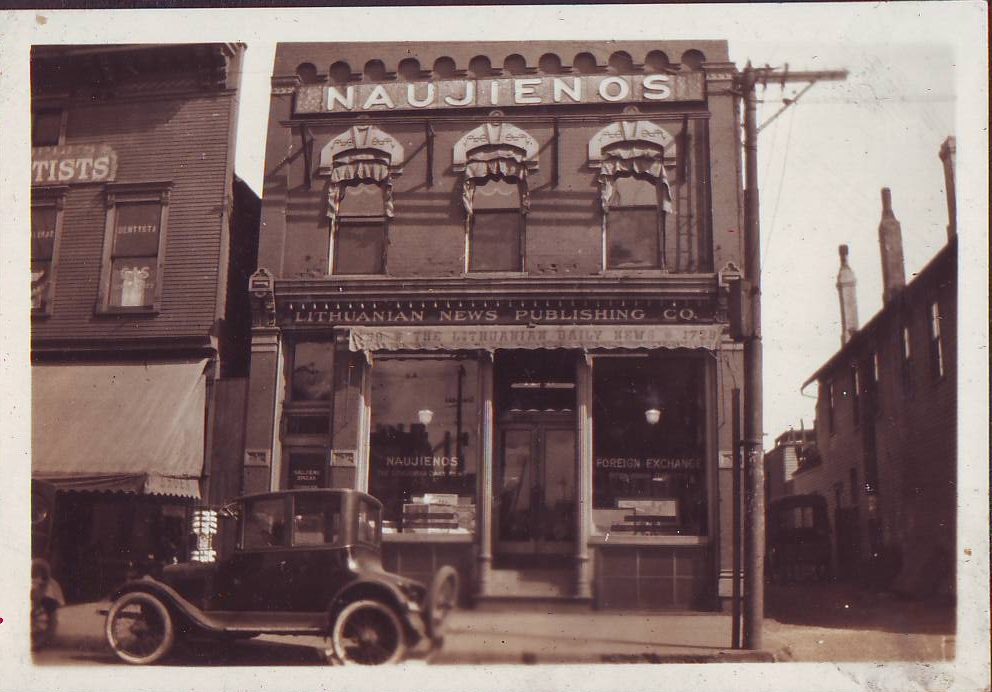
Naujienos office c. 1920 (photo from Vaisvil family album)

Naujienos with the English subtitle The Lithuanian Daily News was a Lithuanian-language socialist daily newspaper published from Chicago, United States. Established in February 1914, it became the first daily for Lithuanian-Americans. After the October Revolution of 1917, the newspaper shifted its political orientation away from communism and socialism and towards social democracy. The newspaper helped to raise funds for Lituanica and Lituanica II, two transatlantic flights by Lithuanian pilots. As of 1960, it had a circulation of around 14,000. Pijus Grigaitis (1914–1919, 1919–1969) and Martynas Gudelis (1969–1986) were the long-time editors of the paper. The newspaper ceased publication in the 1980s.

== See also ==
- Vilnis (Chicago newspaper)
