= Sisters of Saint Casimir =

Official logo

The Sisters of Saint Casimir are a Roman Catholic religious community of women founded in 1907 in Scranton, Pennsylvania, by Mother Maria Kaupas. It is dedicated to Saint Casimir, patron saint of Lithuania.

== Description ==
The order was founded by Maria Kaupas, a native of Lithuania, in 1907 in Scranton, Pennsylvania, United States. Mother Maria was found to have lived a life of heroic virtue by the Congregation of the Causes of Saints under Pope Benedict XVI in Rome on Thursday, July 1, 2010. The community's early work focused on Lithuanian immigrants in the United States.

The order operates in Illinois, Pennsylvania, Washington, D.C., New Mexico and Argentina, and since 1992 in Lithuania at Pažaislis Monastery.

Some institutions sponsored by the order are Villa Joseph Marie High School in Holland, Pennsylvania, and Holy Cross Hospital and the former Maria High School, both in Chicago, Illinois. The Chicago institutions as well as the Sisters of St. Casimir Motherhouse are located just east of Marquette Park in a neighborhood where numerous immigrants from Lithuania settled in the early years of the twentieth century.
