= Lithuanian Research and Studies Center =

Coordinates: 41°39′11.5″N 87°59′57″W

Lithuanian Research and Studies Center (LRSC) (Lithuanian: Lituanistikos tyrimo ir studijų centras (LTSC)) is a non-profit scholarly research organization, which brings together varying cultural and academic organizations towards acquiring and preserving Lithuanian artifacts, documents, and other materials of cultural significance. The LRSC was created in 1982 in Chicago, Illinois to unify a number of other Lithuanian organizations. It has two facilities. Its archival, periodical, audio-visual and musicology collections are in a 7,000 square foot self-owned facility at 15533 129th St. in Lemont. Its 75,000 volume library, Lithuanian Museum, Thomas Remeikis Political Science Library, Jonas Dainauskas History Library, Milda Budrys Medical Museum, military and art archives comprise another 7,000 square feet in the Lithuanian Youth Center (Lietuvių Jaunimo Centras, 5620 S. Claremont Ave.) in Chicago, Illinois. It is funded by donations primarily from the Lithuanian American community. The center is the largest Lithuanian scholarly institution, archive, and publisher outside Lithuania. It has published over 50 scholarly books in both Lithuanian and English. The current chairman of the LRSC is Robert A. Vitas. The current president is Kristina Lapienyte. The LRSC has become a notable organization in Lithuanian studies.

== Leadership ==
=== Chairmen of the Board ===
- Dr. Thomas Remeikis 1982–1988
- Dr. Adolfas Damušis 1988–1998
- Dr. Kazys Ambrozaitis 1998–2001
- Dr. Vytautas Bieliauskas 2001–2010
- Dr. Robert Vitas 2010–present

=== Presidents ===
- Dr. John Račkauskas 1982–2009
- Dr. Augustinas Idzelis 2009–2018
- Kristina Lapienyte 2018–Present

=== Divisions ===
- The Lithuanian World Archives
- Zilevicius-Kreivenas Musicology Archives
- The Lithuanian Medical Museum and Archives
- The Budrys Foto Archives
- The Audio-Visual Media Division
- The Dainauskas Library and Archives
- The LRSC Fine Art Archives
- The Center for the Study of Genocide in Lithuania
- The Ramovenai Military Museum
- The Lithuanian Museum
- The Thomas Remeikis Political Science Archive and Library

== Affiliated organizations ==
- Lithuanian Studies at University of Illinois at Chicago
- Vilnius University
- Vytautas Magnus University
- Klaipėda University
- Martynas Mažvydas National Library of Lithuania
